= Pietenpol Sky Scout =

Air Scout
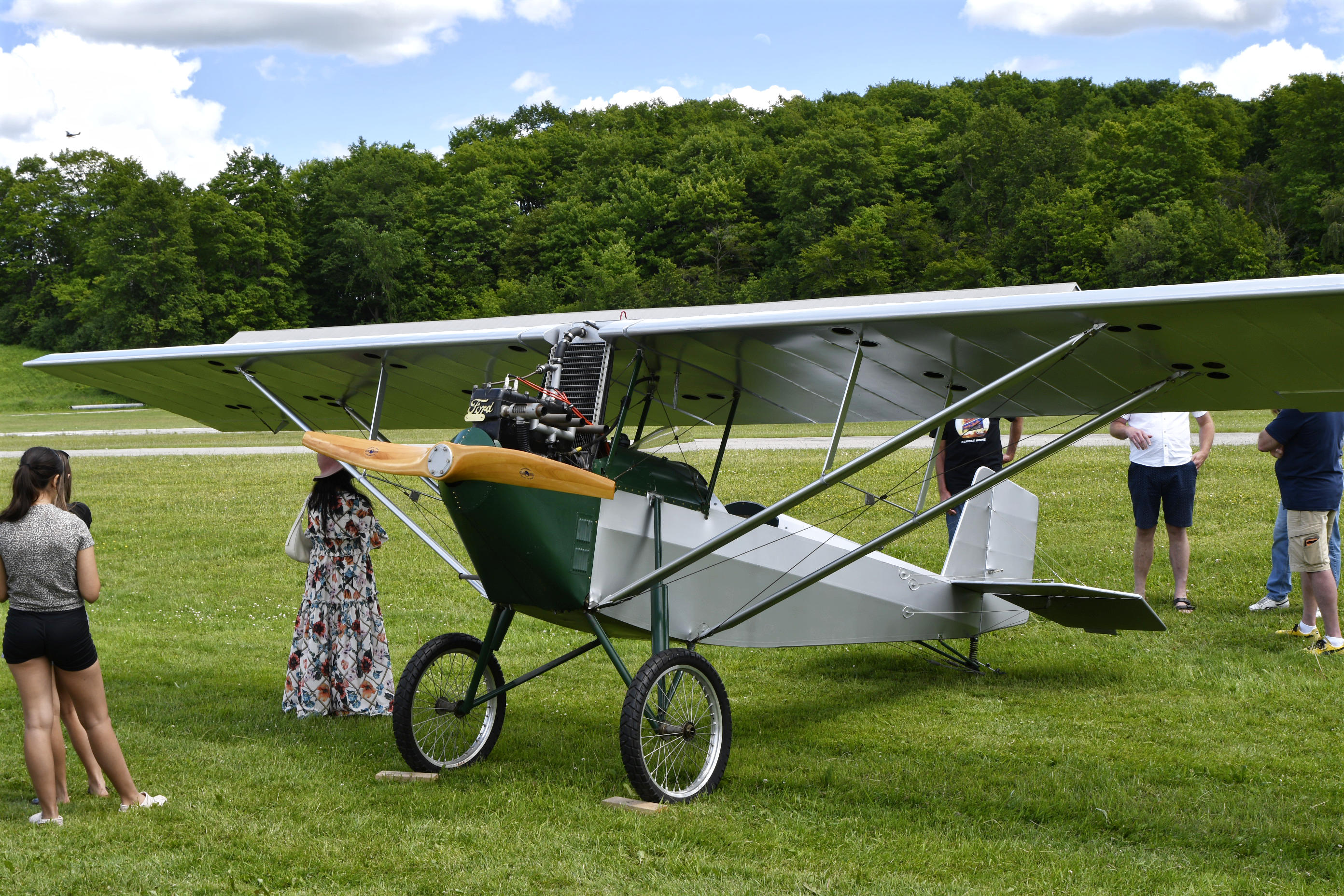
- Pietenpol Sky Scout C-FAAA in 2026

General information
- Type: amateur-built airplane
- National origin: United States
- Manufacturer: Pietenpol
- Designer: Bernard Pietenpol

History
- First flight: 1933
- Developed from: Pietenpol Air Camper

The Pietenpol Sky Scout is a parasol wing homebuilt aircraft designed by Bernard Pietenpol.

== Development ==
The Sky Scout was a lower-cost follow-on to the Pietenpol's first homebuilt design, the Pietenpol Air Camper, using a lower-cost Ford Model T engine, rather than the more current Ford Model A engine. The aircraft was redesigned for the heavier engine by reducing it to a single-person aircraft. The new pilot location required a section called a "flop" to be installed, essentially a section of the wing that was hinged up to allow the pilot to stand up when getting into and out of the aircraft. The aircraft was designed to be built of spruce and plywood. The drawings were published in the 1933 Mechanix Illustrated magazine.

== Survivors ==
- A Sky Scout is on display at the Pioneer Flight Museum in Kingsbury, Texas. This Scout is powered by a Model A engine. It is intended to be a flyable aircraft but for the present is only occasionally run up.
- The number one Pietenpol with a 1921 Model T engine is on display at the Model T Museum in Richmond, Indiana.
- Sky Scout N1933A is on display at the Western Antique Aeroplane & Automobile Museum in Hood River, Oregon.
- One is on display at the Minnesota Historical Center, Fountain, Minnesota, just 15 miles from Pietenpol's home town of Cherry Grove. Bernard Pietenpol is also buried in Fountain.
- Sky Scout CF-BAA was tracked down and found in a trailer in Saskatchewan, Canada, where it had been stored for a quarter of a century. Some parts are missing, including the engine, propeller, two elevators and a rudder.

== Variants ==
Claude Sessions developed a finned head modification on his Sky Scout for lighter-weight air-cooling. The engine was featured in Modern Mechanics magazine in 1931 and formed the basis for the American Flea Corporation Universal 50-60 engine.

== Specifications ==
Data from Sport Aviation & Plans

General characteristics

- Crew: one
- Capacity: 170lb - 210lb
- Length: 16 ft 3 in (4.95 m)
- Wingspan: 27 ft 3 in (8.31 m)
- Height: 8 ft 5 in (2.57 m)
- Wing area: 136.25 sq ft (12.658 m^{2}) 5 ft chord
- Aspect ratio: 5.45:1
- Airfoil: Pietenpol FC-10 "French Curve"
- Empty weight: 405 lb (184 kg) weight buildup from plans
- Gross weight: 640 lb (290 kg)
- Max takeoff weight: 680 lb (308 kg) Estimated
- Fuel capacity: 5.5 Gal
- Powerplant: 1 × Ford Model T engine Inline four cylinder piston, 20 hp (15 kW) Modified to produce 28-32hp: Enlarged cylinder bores, aluminum "Ritefit" pistons, machined to fit with 0.007" skirt clearance, 0.025" ringland and head clearances. Higher permitted operating speed above 1,850rpm. (Ford Model-T; 20hp@1,600rpm).
- Propellers: 2-bladed 72 x 42

Performance

- Maximum speed: 54 kn (62 mph, 100 km/h)
- Cruise speed: 48 kn (55 mph, 89 km/h) @1,600rpm
- Stall speed: 30 kn (35 mph, 56 km/h)
- Range: 87 nmi (100 mi, 160 km)
- Endurance: About 1.5 hours, plus 30 minutes reserve.
- Rate of climb: 200 ft/min (1.0 m/s)
- Wing loading: 4.7 lb/sq ft (23 kg/m^{2})

== See also ==
Aircraft of comparable role, configuration, and era

- Fisher FP-505 Skeeter
- Heath Parasol
- Loehle Sport Parasol
- Pop's Props Cloudster
- Pop's Props Zing
- RagWing RW1 Ultra-Piet
- Smith Termite

Related lists

- List of civil aircraft
