= Powell P-70 Acey Deucy =

P-70 Acey Deucy
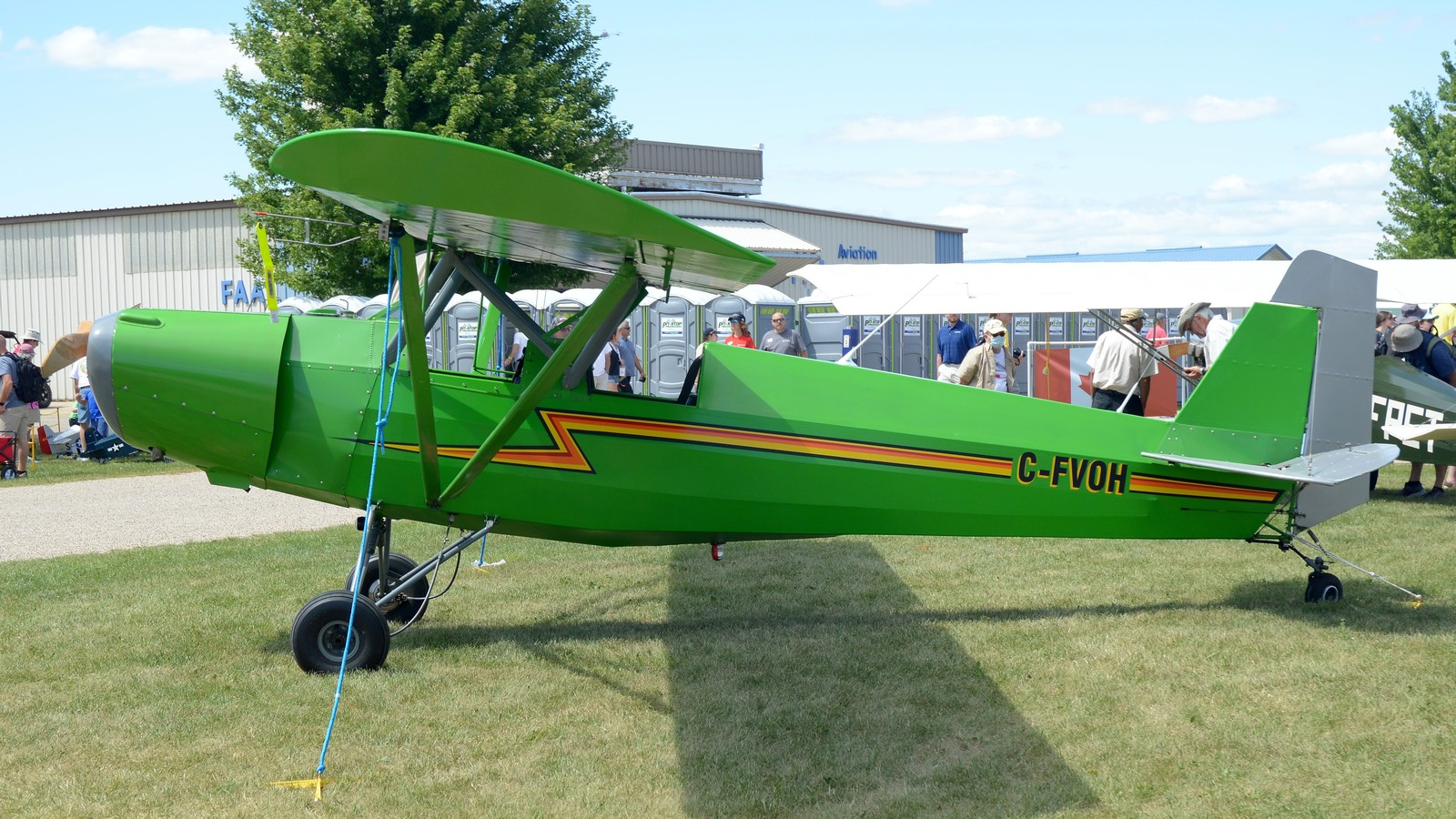
- Powell P-70 Acey Deucy C-FVOH

General information
- Type: Two-seat homebuilt monoplane
- National origin: United States
- Designer: John C. Powell

History
- Introduction date: 1970
- First flight: 20 June 1970

The Powell P-70 Acey Deucy is an American two-seat parasol wing monoplane designed and built by John C. Powell for amateur construction.

== Design and development ==
The design of the P-70 Acey Deucy was started by former United States Navy Commander John C. Powell in 1966 with construction commencing in 1967. It was certified by the Federal Aviation Administration in the experimental homebuilt category and the prototype first flew on 20 June 1970. Following testing the design was sold as plans for homebuilding.

The Acey Deucy is a two-seat parasol-wing monoplane with vee-bracing struts on each side supporting the composite structure fabric-covered wing. The fabric-covered fuselage and tail unit are a welded steel-tube structure with wire-bracing on the tail unit. The Acey Deucy can be powered by a sole piston engine rated between 65 and 90 hp, the prototype had a 65 hp (48 kW) Continental A65 air-cooled engine driving a metal two-bladed fixed-pitch propeller. The conventional landing gear has a tailskid and the fuselage has two open cockpits in tandem, the front cockpit has a small door on the starboard side.

== Specifications (Prototype) ==
Data from Jane's All the World's Aircraft 1973-74

General characteristics

- Crew: 1
- Capacity: 1 passenger
- Length: 20 ft 9 in (6.32 m)
- Wingspan: 32 ft 6 in (9.91 m)
- Height: 6 ft 9 in (2.06 m)
- Wing area: 155 sq ft (14.4 m^{2})
- Empty weight: 750 lb (340 kg)
- Gross weight: 1,275 lb (578 kg)
- Powerplant: 1 × Continental A65 four-cylinder, horizontally opposed air-cooled piston engine , 65 hp (48 kW)

Performance

- Maximum speed: 98 mph (158 km/h, 85 kn)
- Cruise speed: 83 mph (134 km/h, 72 kn)
- Stall speed: 25 mph (40.5 km/h, 22 kn)
- Range: 250 mi (402 km, 220 nmi)
- Rate of climb: 350 ft/min (1.8 m/s)

== See also ==
Aircraft of comparable role, configuration, and era

- Heath Parasol
- Pietenpol Air Camper
