= Bernard Pietenpol =

- Born: 1901
- Died: 1984 (aged 82–83)
- Known for: Homebuilt aircraft

Bernard H. Pietenpol (1901–1984) was an aircraft designer.

A designer of homebuilt aircraft, Pietenpol was a self-taught mechanic who lived most of his life in the small community of Cherry Grove in southeastern Minnesota.

His best-known design, the Pietenpol Air Camper, was meant to be built and flown by the "average American" of the 1930s. The Air Camper is a two-place open cockpit monoplane with "parasol" wing built from material that was, in the 1930s, readily available from local sources. Powered by a Ford Model A engine, and first flown with one in May 1929, Pietenpol's design was sturdy, simple and affordable. Plans were first published in Modern Mechanics and Inventions, then in the magazine's 1932 Flying and Glider Manual.

With the success of the Air Camper, MMI editor Weston Farmer convinced Pietenpol to design an airplane that could be powered with the cheaper and more readily available Ford Model T engine. In response to Farmer's request, Pietenpol designed the single-place Pietenpol Sky Scout.

Air Campers have been built using many (over 50 have been recorded) different power plants. Pietenpol himself liked the air-cooled Corvair engine. But his original design is well suited to the high torque, slow-turning Model "A."

A restored example of the Air Camper can be found in the inventory of the Mid-Atlantic Air Museum in Reading, Pennsylvania.

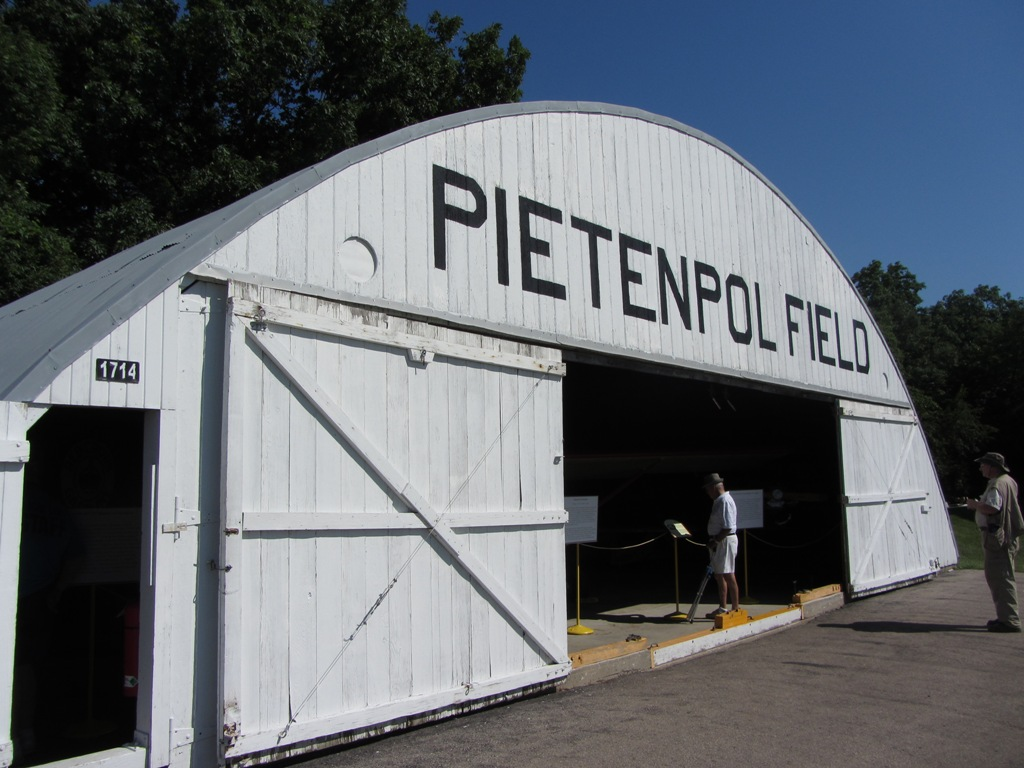
The Pietenpol Field Hangar relocated to Oshkosh Wisconsin in 1984

In later years, Pietenpol sold and repaired television sets. In 1981, the Pietenpol Workshop and Garage was added to the National Register of Historic Places. His hangar was disassembled and relocated to Pioneer Airport, in Oshkosh, Wisconsin as part of the EAA Aviation Museum. Pietenpol died in 1984, and was inducted in the Minnesota Aviation Hall of Fame in 1991.
