= Pietenpol Workshop and Garage =

- Bernard H. Pietenpol Workshop and Garage
- U.S. National Register of Historic Places
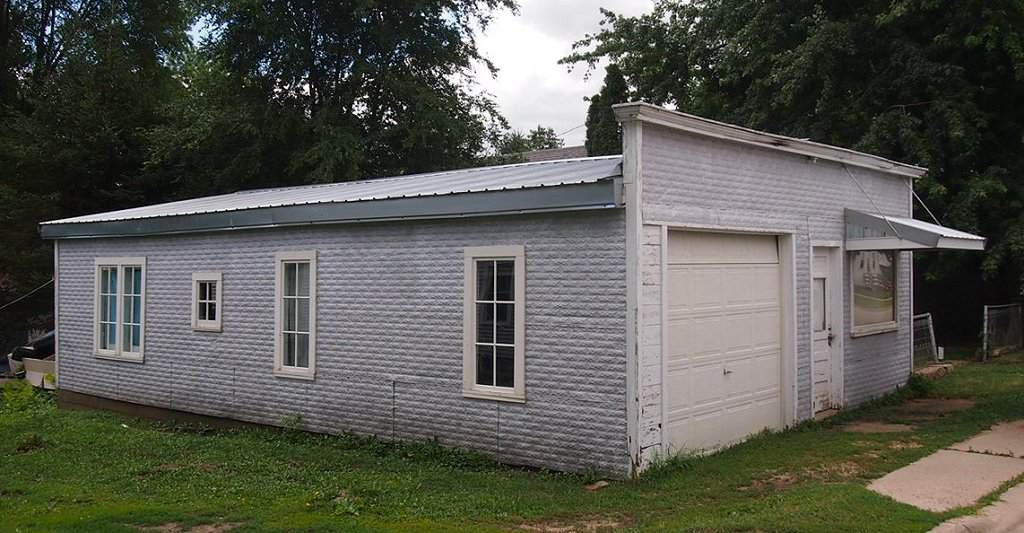
- Pietenpol Workshop and Garage from the northwest

- Location within Minnesota
- Location: Fillmore County Road 5, Cherry Grove, Minnesota
- Coordinates: 43°35′17″N 92°17′18″W
- MPS: Fillmore County MRA
- NRHP reference No.: 82002949
- Added to NRHP: April 27, 1982

The Pietenpol Workshop and Garage is a small building in Cherry Grove, Minnesota, United States, where aviation pioneer Bernard Pietenpol designed and built aircraft. The wood-framed structure was added to the National Register of Historic Places in 1981. The original hangar from Pietenpol Field was moved to Pioneer Airport in Oshkosh, Wisconsin.
