= Pop's Props =

American homebuilt aircraft manufacturer

- Company type: Privately held company
- Industry: Aerospace
- Founded: circa 1994
- Founder: Scott Land
- Defunct: 2010
- Successor: Simplex Aeroplanes
- Headquarters: Cooksville, Illinois, United States
- Products: Ultralight aircraft
- Owner: Scott Land

Pop's Props was an American aircraft manufacturer, founded by Scott Land in about 1994 and based in Cooksville, Illinois. The company specialized in the design and manufacture of ultralight aircraft in the form of plans and kits for amateur construction and operation under the US FAR 103 Ultralight Vehicles rules.

All the company's designs were of wood and fabric construction. The first was the Pop's Props Pinocchio, introduced in 1994. The Pinocchio is a single seat First World War fighter replica and three were flying by 1998. The Cloudster, a single seat parasol wing ultralight followed in 1995 and the Zing, a derivative of the Cloudster, in 1996.

Land became interested in selling the designs and closing the company early in the 21st century. In 2010 Jeff Erekson made an offer to buy the designs and the deal was completed in February 2011. Erekson formed Simplex Aeroplanes to sell the Cloudster and Zing aircraft.

== Aircraft ==
Summary of aircraft built by Pop's Props
Model name	First flight	Number built	Type
Pop's Props Pinocchio	1994	3 (1998)	Single seat First World War fighter replica
Pop's Props Cloudster	1995	3 (1998)	Single seat parasol wing ultralight aircraft
Pop's Props Zing	1996	5 (1998)	Single seat parasol wing ultralight aircraft
