= Pop's Props Pinocchio =

American homebuilt light aircraft

General information
- Type: Kit aircraft
- National origin: United States
- Manufacturer: Pop's Props
- Status: Production completed
- Number built: 3 (1998)

History
- First flight: 1994
- Developed from: Fokker Eindecker

The Pop's Props Pinocchio is a single seat, open-cockpit, mid-wing, single-engine monoplane that was inspired by the Fokker Eindecker and first flown in 1994. The aircraft was produced by Pop's Props of Cooksville, Illinois and made available as plans or in kit form. The company is no longer in business and the aircraft kit is no longer available.

The aircraft was designed for the FAR 103 Ultralight Vehicles category, including the category's 254 lb (115 kg) empty weight limit. The standard empty weight of the Pinocchio is 254 lb (115 kg).

== Design and development ==
While the Pinocchio was inspired by the First World War Fokker Eindecker, it is not a replica of that classic fighter aircraft. Reviewer Andre Cliche explains:

This one is meant to resemble the Fokker Eindecker of WWI fame. While it is far from being an exact replica, it still features the same general configuration of the vintage fighter. Flying the Pinocchio enables the owner to experience the pioneering days without fear of being shot in the back.

The Pinocchio is constructed of wood and covered in aircraft fabric. The landing gear is conventional with bungee-sprung spoked mainwheels and includes a tailskid. The mid-mounted wing has a double surface and full-span ailerons. The wing is wire-braced from a kingpost mounted just ahead of the single cockpit. The fuselage is square in cross-section and the aft part from the wing root to the tailplane is not fabric covered, but is left as bare wooden structure to save weight. The standard recommended engine is the Half VW of 45 hp (34 kW), with a starter as optional. The designer recommended power range is 40 to 50 hp (30 to 37 kW).

The open-cockpit environment, without a windshield, requires that the pilot wear goggles as was common in World War I.

Due to the laborious wood and fabric construction, builder completion time from plans is estimated at 750 man-hours and 500 hours from the kit. At the time the kit was available, it could be ordered as one kit or as several sub-kits.

== Specifications (Pinocchio) ==
Data from Cliche, Purdy and Kitplanes

General characteristics

- Crew: One
- Length: 16 ft 6 in (5.03 m)
- Wingspan: 25 ft 10 in (7.87 m)
- Height: 5 ft 6 in (1.68 m)
- Wing area: 115.8 sq ft (10.76 m^{2})
- Empty weight: 254 lb (115 kg)
- Gross weight: 500 lb (227 kg)
- Fuel capacity: 5 US gallons (19 litres)
- Powerplant: 1 × Half VW , 45 hp (34 kW)
- Propellers: 2-bladed wooden propeller

Performance

- Maximum speed: 70 mph (110 km/h, 61 kn)
- Cruise speed: 60 mph (97 km/h, 52 kn)
- Stall speed: 27 mph (43 km/h, 23 kn)
- Range: 120 mi (190 km, 100 nmi)
- Service ceiling: 6,000 ft (1,800 m)
- Rate of climb: 650 ft/min (3.3 m/s)
- Wing loading: 4.3 lb/sq ft (21 kg/m^{2})

Armament

- Guns: Some builders have installed one replica machine gun

Avionics

- none

== See also ==
Aircraft of comparable role, configuration, and era

- Airdrome Eindecker E-III
