= St Croix Excelsior =

American ultralight aircraft

Excelsior

General information
- Type: Ultralight aircraft
- National origin: United States
- Manufacturer: St Croix Aircraft
- Designer: Chad Wille and Charles Wille
- Status: Production completed

History
- Manufactured: 1980-circa 2000
- First flight: 1980

The St Croix Excelsior (English: ever higher) is an American ultralight aircraft that was designed by Chad Wille and Charles Wille, produced by St Croix Aircraft of Corning, Iowa and first flown in 1980. The aircraft was supplied in the form of plans for amateur construction with some hard-to-make parts available as well as partial kits.

== Design and development ==
The Excelsior was designed to comply with the US FAR 103 Ultralight Vehicles rules, including the category's maximum empty weight of 254 lb (115 kg). The aircraft has a standard empty weight of 250 lb (113 kg). It features a strut-braced high-wing, a single-seat, open cockpit, tricycle landing gear and a single engine in pusher configuration.

The aircraft fuselage is made from welded 4130 steel tubing, with the wings and tail built from riveted sheet aluminum, aluminum tubing and covered with doped aircraft fabric covering. Its straight leading edge, tapered trailing edge, 34.6 ft (10.5 m) span wing is braced with a single lift strut per side. The pilot sits in an open cockpit, with a small windshield. The engine and tail configuration are unconventional. The specified Zenoah G25 20 hp (15 kW) engine is mounted on top of the high wing and drives the tail-mounted propeller through a flexible extension shaft, that is designed to eliminate vibrations. The tailplane and elevator are mounted on top of the rear fuselage, with the fin and rudder mounted below the tailplane, providing protection for the propeller from contacting the ground. The controls are conventional, except that roll control is provided by spoilers, rather than ailerons. The landing gear consists of suspended main gear, a nose wheel and a rudder-mounted rear skid.

The aircraft has enough gliding performance to be soared. The construction time from the plans is estimated at 400 hours. Plans were intermittently available between 1980 and about 2000, but from 2001 the design was not advertised as being available by the company any longer.

== Specifications (Excelsior) ==
Data from Cliche, Kitplanes and Purdy

General characteristics

- Crew: one
- Length: 16 ft 6 in (5.03 m)
- Wingspan: 34 ft 7 in (10.54 m)
- Height: 6 ft 0 in (1.83 m)
- Wing area: 136 sq ft (12.6 m^{2})
- Empty weight: 250 lb (113 kg)
- Gross weight: 525 lb (238 kg)
- Fuel capacity: 5 U.S. gallons (19 L; 4.2 imp gal)
- Powerplant: 1 × Zenoah G25 , 20 hp (15 kW)

Performance

- Maximum speed: 75 mph (121 km/h, 65 kn)
- Cruise speed: 65 mph (105 km/h, 56 kn)
- Stall speed: 25 mph (40 km/h, 22 kn)
- Range: 125 mi (201 km, 109 nmi)
- g limits: +4/-4
- Maximum glide ratio: 20:1
- Rate of climb: 600 ft/min (3.0 m/s)
