= St Croix Pietenpol Aerial =

American homebuilt aircraft

Pietenpol Aerial

General information
- Type: Homebuilt aircraft
- National origin: United States
- Manufacturer: St Croix Aircraft
- Designer: Chad and Charles Wille
- Status: Production completed
- Number built: at least one

History
- First flight: 1977
- Developed from: St Croix Pietenpol Aircamper

The St Croix Pietenpol Aerial is an American homebuilt aircraft that was designed by Chad and Charles Wille and produced by St Croix Aircraft of Corning, Iowa, first flown in 1977. When it was available the aircraft was supplied in the form of plans for amateur construction, with partial kits available.

== Design and development ==
The Pietenpol Aerial was conceived as a biplane adaptation of the Pietenpol Air Camper parasol wing homebuilt design. The design work was completed in 1974 and the first example flown in 1977, with the plans as supplemental drawings to the Aircamper plans. The resulting aircraft features a biplane layout, two separate tandem open cockpits with individual windshields, fixed conventional landing gear and a single engine in tractor configuration.

The aircraft is made from a combination of wood and welded steel tubing, all covered in doped aircraft fabric. Its 29.50 ft (9.0 m) span wing has four ailerons and has a combined wing area of 250.0 sq ft (23.23 m^{2}). The lower wing is removable, allowing the aircraft to fly as an Aircamper parasol monoplane. The cabin width is 24 in (61 cm). The acceptable power range is 85 to 150 hp (63 to 112 kW) and the standard engine used is the 125 hp (93 kW) Continental O-240 powerplant.

The aircraft has a typical empty weight of 700 lb (320 kg) and a gross weight of 1,300 lb (590 kg), giving a useful load of 600 lb (270 kg). With full fuel of 25 U.S. gallons (95 L; 21 imp gal) the payload for the pilot, passenger and baggage is 450 lb (200 kg).

The designers estimated the construction time from the supplied plans as 1200 hours.

Flight testing showed that the aircraft has shorter take-off and landing distances that the standard Aircamper, a lower stall speed and better stability in turbulence. The standard day, sea level, no wind, take off with a 125 hp (93 kW) engine is 200 ft (61 m) and the landing roll is 400 ft (122 m).

== Operational history ==
By 1998, the company reported that 400 sets of plans had been sold.

In February 2014, one example was registered in the United States with the Federal Aviation Administration.

== Specifications (Pietenpol Aerial) ==
Data from AeroCrafter

General characteristics

- Crew: one
- Capacity: one passenger
- Length: 19 ft 6 in (5.94 m)
- Wingspan: 29 ft 6 in (8.99 m)
- Wing area: 250.0 sq ft (23.23 m^{2})
- Empty weight: 700 lb (318 kg)
- Gross weight: 1,300 lb (590 kg)
- Fuel capacity: 25 U.S. gallons (95 L; 21 imp gal)
- Powerplant: 1 × Continental O-240 four cylinder, air-cooled, four stroke aircraft engine, 125 hp (93 kW)
- Propellers: 2-bladed wooden fixed pitch

Performance

- Maximum speed: 105 mph (169 km/h, 91 kn)
- Cruise speed: 85 mph (137 km/h, 74 kn)
- Stall speed: 36 mph (58 km/h, 31 kn)
- Range: 150 mi (240 km, 130 nmi)
- Service ceiling: 1,000 ft (300 m)
- Wing loading: 5.2 lb/sq ft (25 kg/m^{2})
