= Loehle Sport Parasol =

American homebuilt airplane

General information
- Type: Ultralight aircraft
- National origin: United States
- Manufacturer: Loehle Aircraft
- Status: Production completed
- Number built: 82 (2011)

History
- Introduction date: 1991

The Loehle Sport Parasol is an American single-seat, parasol winged, single engine, ultralight aircraft produced in kit form by Loehle Aircraft for amateur construction. The aircraft meets the requirements of the US FAR 103 Ultralight Vehicles regulations.

When the design was introduced to the market it garnered a high degree of attention for its very low kit price, although the initial price did not include the engine, propeller, instruments or covering supplies. It was still one of the lower cost kit aircraft in 2010. Loehle Aircraft is believed to have ceased operations in 2017.

== Design and development ==
The Sport Parasol was introduced in 1991. The aircraft is conventional in construction, built predominantly from wood and riveted aluminum tubing, covered in doped aircraft fabric. The wings are double-surface, with half-span ailerons. The wings detach and the tailplane folds for trailer transport and storage. The landing gear is of conventional configuration, with bungee-sprung main gear and a steerable tailwheel.

The initial engine recommended for the design was the now out-of-production 28 hp (21 kW) Rotax 277. Recommended engines today include 40 hp (30 kW) Rotax 447 and the 50 hp (37 kW) Rotax 503. Kit options include brakes, an extra 5 US gal (19 L) fuel tank, spoked wheels, floats and skis. Construction time from the kit is reported as 350 hours.

Reviewer Andre Cliche describes the aircraft as "a very attractive and simple parasol design that flies perfectly."

Bayerl et al. said of the aircraft, "for very low-cost flying this is pretty much it... [the Sport Parasol] offers plenty of fun for little money."

== Specifications (Sport Parasol) ==
Data from Kitplanes and Loehle

General characteristics

- Crew: one
- Length: 18 ft 5 in (5.61 m)
- Wingspan: 25 ft 6 in (7.77 m)
- Height: 6 ft 0 in (1.83 m)
- Wing area: 114 sq ft (10.6 m^{2})
- Empty weight: 252 lb (114 kg)
- Gross weight: 600 lb (272 kg)
- Fuel capacity: 5 US gallons (38 litres)
- Powerplant: 1 × Rotax 503 twin-cylinder, two-stroke aircraft engine, 50 hp (37 kW)
- Propellers: 2-bladed wooden

Performance

- Maximum speed: 85 mph (137 km/h, 74 kn)
- Cruise speed: 65 mph (105 km/h, 56 kn)
- Stall speed: 22 mph (35 km/h, 19 kn)
- Never exceed speed: 85 mph (137 km/h, 74 kn)
- Range: 230 mi (370 km, 200 nmi)
- Service ceiling: 12,500 ft (3,800 m)
- g limits: +4/-2 operational, +6/-3 ultimate load limit
- Rate of climb: 750 ft/min (3.8 m/s)

== See also ==
Aircraft of comparable role, configuration, and era

- Aerotique Parasol
- Fisher FP-505 Skeeter
- Heath Parasol
- Pietenpol Air Camper
- Pop's Props Cloudster
- Pop's Props Zing
