= St Croix Sopwith Triplane =

American homebuilt aircraft

General information
- Type: Homebuilt aircraft
- National origin: United States
- Manufacturer: St Croix Aircraft
- Status: Production completed

History
- Developed from: Sopwith Triplane

The St Croix Sopwith Triplane is an American homebuilt aircraft that was designed and produced by St Croix Aircraft of Corning, Iowa. When it was available the aircraft was supplied as a kit or in the form of plans for amateur construction. The aircraft is a full-size replica of the 1916 Sopwith Triplane fighter aircraft.

== Design and development ==
The aircraft features a cantilever strut-braced triplane layout, a single-seat, with an optional two-seats-in-tandem open cockpit, fixed conventional landing gear and a single engine in tractor configuration.

The St Croix Sopwith Triplane differs from the original 1916 design in that it employs a welded steel tube fuselage, modern engine installation and other minor details. The Triplane is all covered in doped aircraft fabric. Its 26.50 ft (8.1 m) span wing uses strut and cable-bracing and has a wing area of 231.0 sq ft (21.46 m^{2}). The cabin width is 27 in (69 cm). The acceptable power range is 150 to 250 hp (112 to 186 kW) and the standard engine used is the 190 hp (142 kW) Lycoming O-435 powerplant.

The St Croix Sopwith Triplane has a typical empty weight of 1,475 lb (669 kg) and a gross weight of 2,000 lb (910 kg), giving a useful load of 525 lb (238 kg). With full fuel of 35 U.S. gallons (130 L; 29 imp gal) the payload for the pilot, passengers and baggage is 315 lb (143 kg).

The standard day, sea level, no wind, take off with a 190 hp (142 kW) engine is 250 ft (76 m) and the landing roll is 750 ft (229 m).

The manufacturer estimated the construction time from the supplied kit as 4000 hours.

== Operational history ==
By 1998 the company reported that 25 kits had been sold and 15 aircraft were completed and flying.

== Specifications (St Croix Sopwith Triplane) ==
Data from AeroCrafter

General characteristics

- Crew: one
- Capacity: one passenger
- Length: 19 ft 6 in (5.94 m)
- Wingspan: 26 ft 6 in (8.08 m)
- Wing area: 231 sq ft (21.5 m^{2})
- Empty weight: 1,475 lb (669 kg)
- Gross weight: 2,000 lb (907 kg)
- Fuel capacity: 35 U.S. gallons (130 L; 29 imp gal)
- Powerplant: 1 × Lycoming O-435 six cylinder, air-cooled, four stroke aircraft engine, 190 hp (140 kW)
- Propellers: 2-bladed wooden fixed pitch

Performance

- Maximum speed: 117 mph (188 km/h, 102 kn)
- Cruise speed: 97 mph (156 km/h, 84 kn)
- Stall speed: 40 mph (64 km/h, 35 kn)
- Range: 250 mi (400 km, 220 nmi)
- Rate of climb: 1,000 ft/min (5.1 m/s)
- Wing loading: 8.7 lb/sq ft (42 kg/m^{2})

Armament

- Guns: one replica .303 caliber Vickers machine gun
