= Grega Aircamper =

GN-1 Aircamper
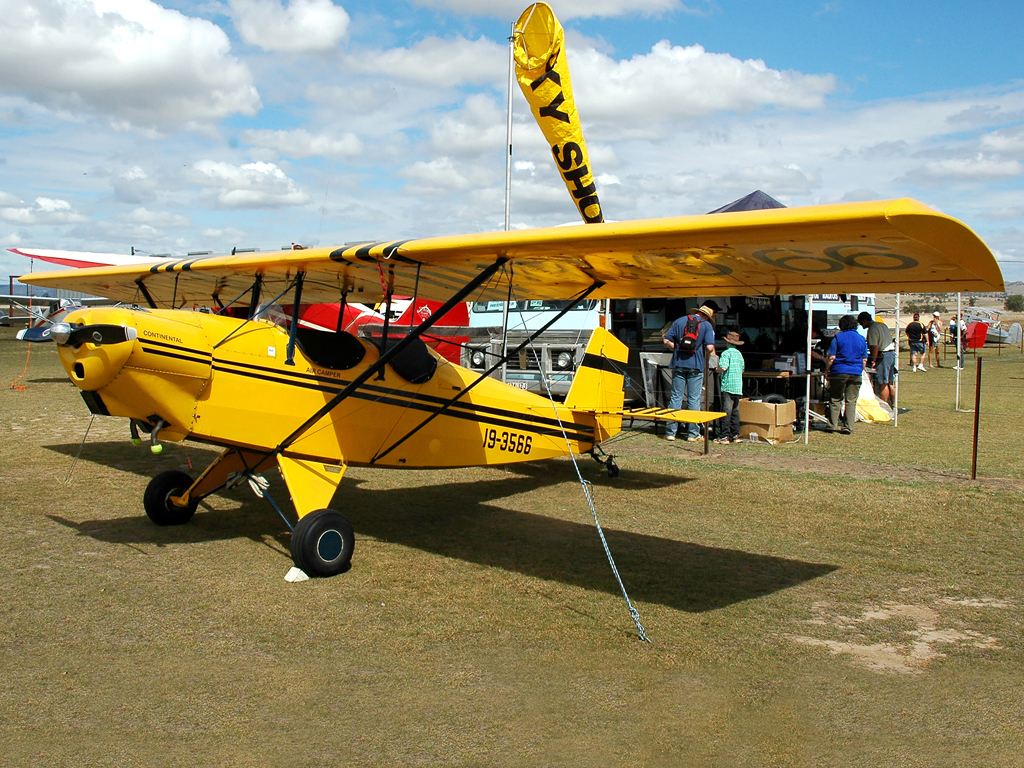

General information
- Type: Sports plane
- National origin: United States
- Manufacturer: Homebuilt
- Designer: John W. Grega, Elmer Niebecker

History
- First flight: 1963

The Grega GN-1 Aircamper was a light aircraft developed in the United States in the early 1960s, originally as a personal project of its designer, but later marketed in plans form for homebuilding. John W. Grega initially set out to create a modernised version of the Pietenpol Air Camper using structural components from a Piper Cub but incorporating them into a new fuselage design based on the Pietenpol original. Two wings were designed, one based on the Cub wing, and another as a modernised version of the Pietenpol wing.

== Specifications (GN-1) ==
Data from Air Trails

General characteristics

- Crew: One pilot
- Capacity: 1 passenger
- Length: 18 ft 4 in (5.59 m)
- Wingspan: 29 ft 0 in (8.84 m)
- Height: 6 ft 4 in (1.93 m)
- Gross weight: 1,129 lb (512 kg)
- Powerplant: 1 × Continental A65-8 , 65 hp (49 kW)

Performance

- Maximum speed: 95 mph (153 km/h, 83 kn)
- Range: 400 mi (640 km, 350 nmi)
- Rate of climb: 600 ft/min (3.0 m/s)

== See also ==
Related development

- Pietenpol Air Camper
