= Aerotique Parasol =

American ultralight aircraft

Parasol
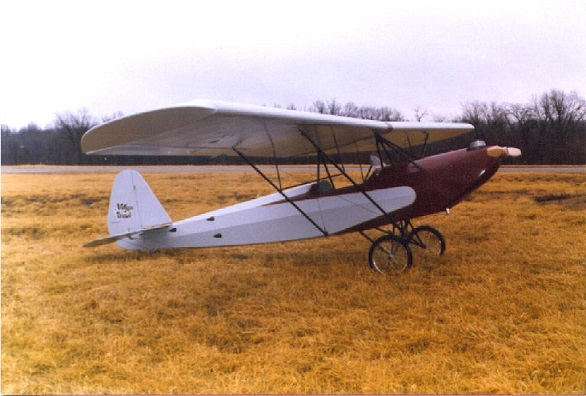

General information
- Type: Ultralight aircraft
- National origin: United States
- Manufacturer: Aerotique Aviation; Yesteryear Aviation
- Status: Production completed

History
- Developed from: Heath Parasol

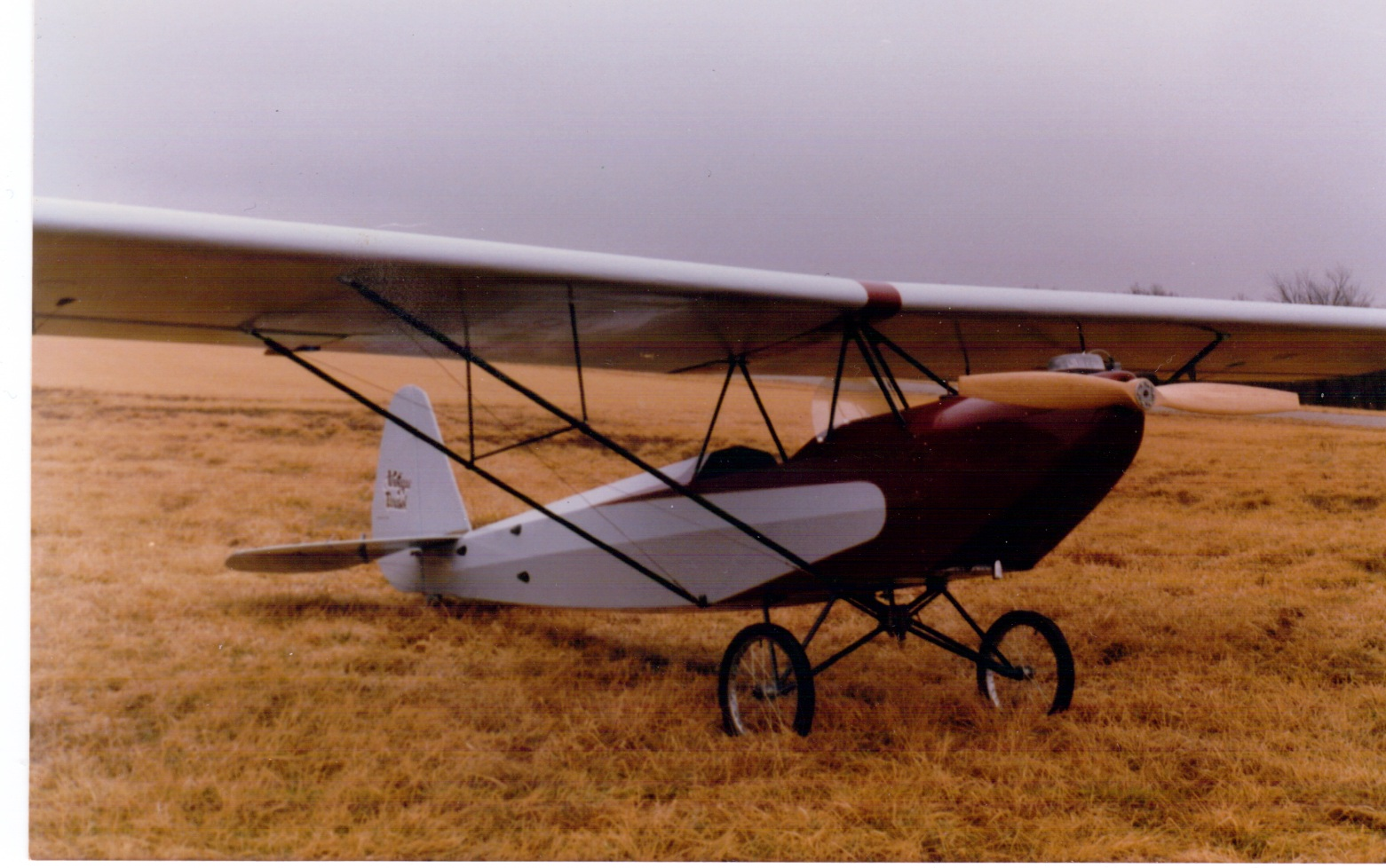
Aerotique Parasol

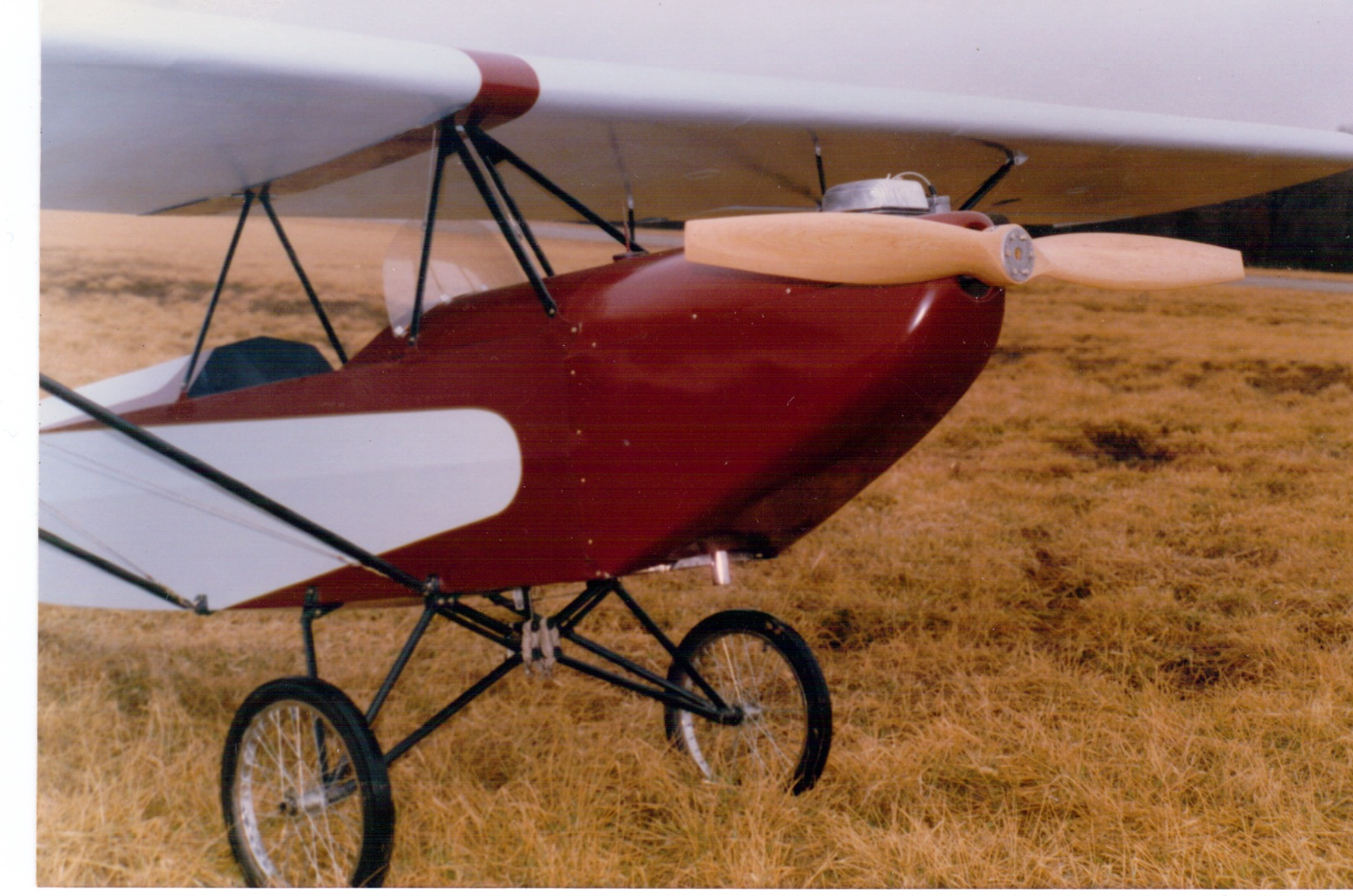
Aerotique Parasol

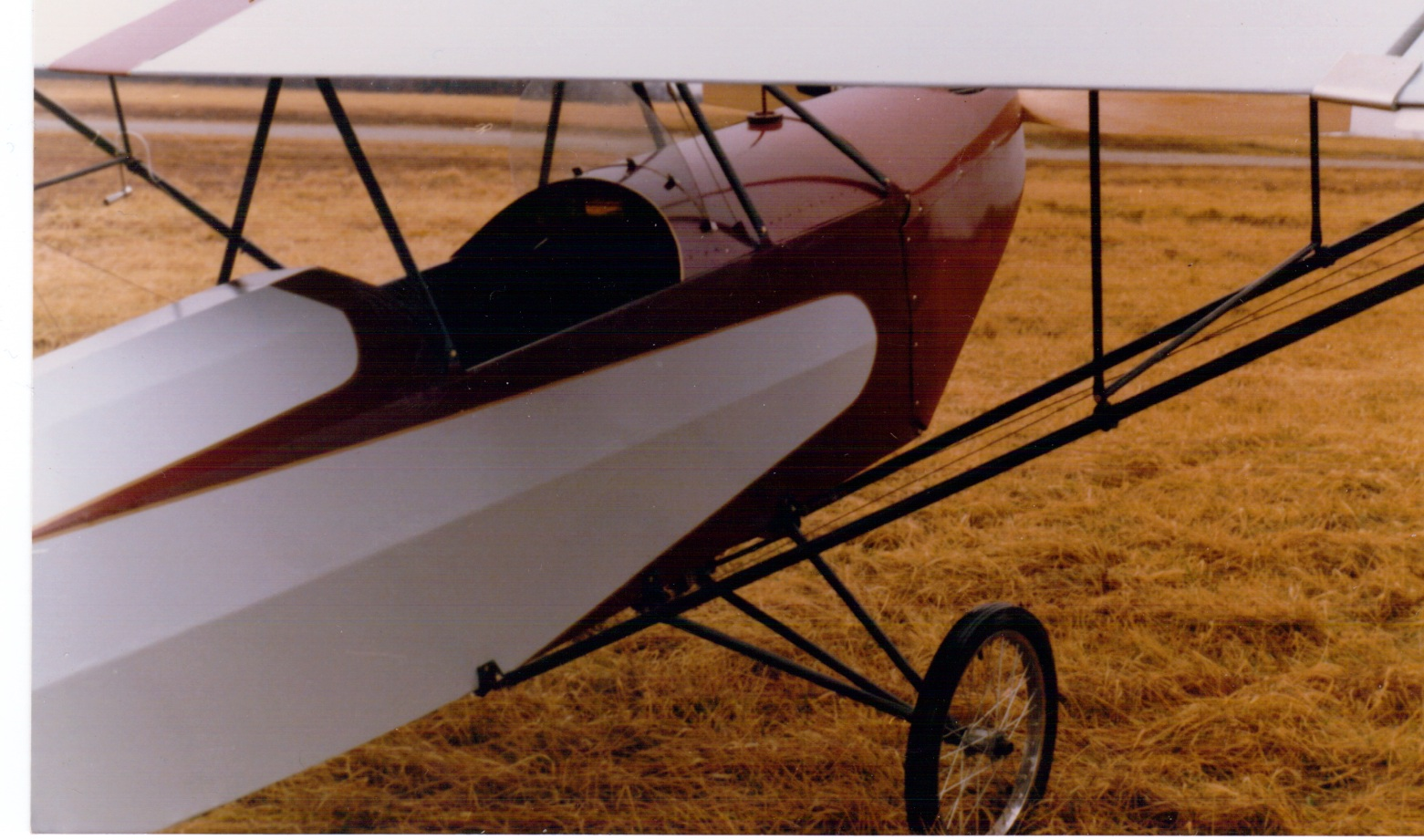
Aerotique Parasol

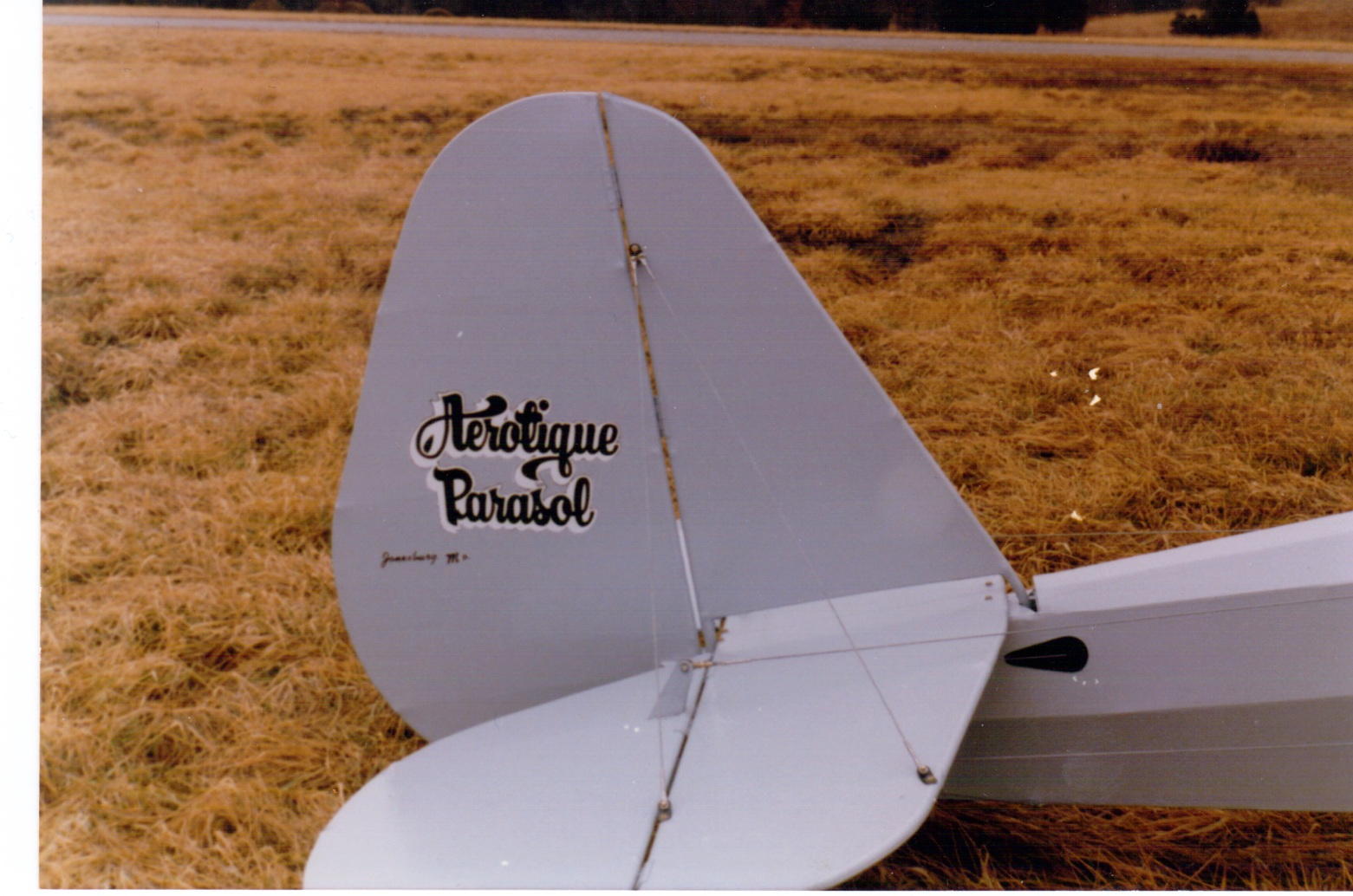
Aerotique Parasol

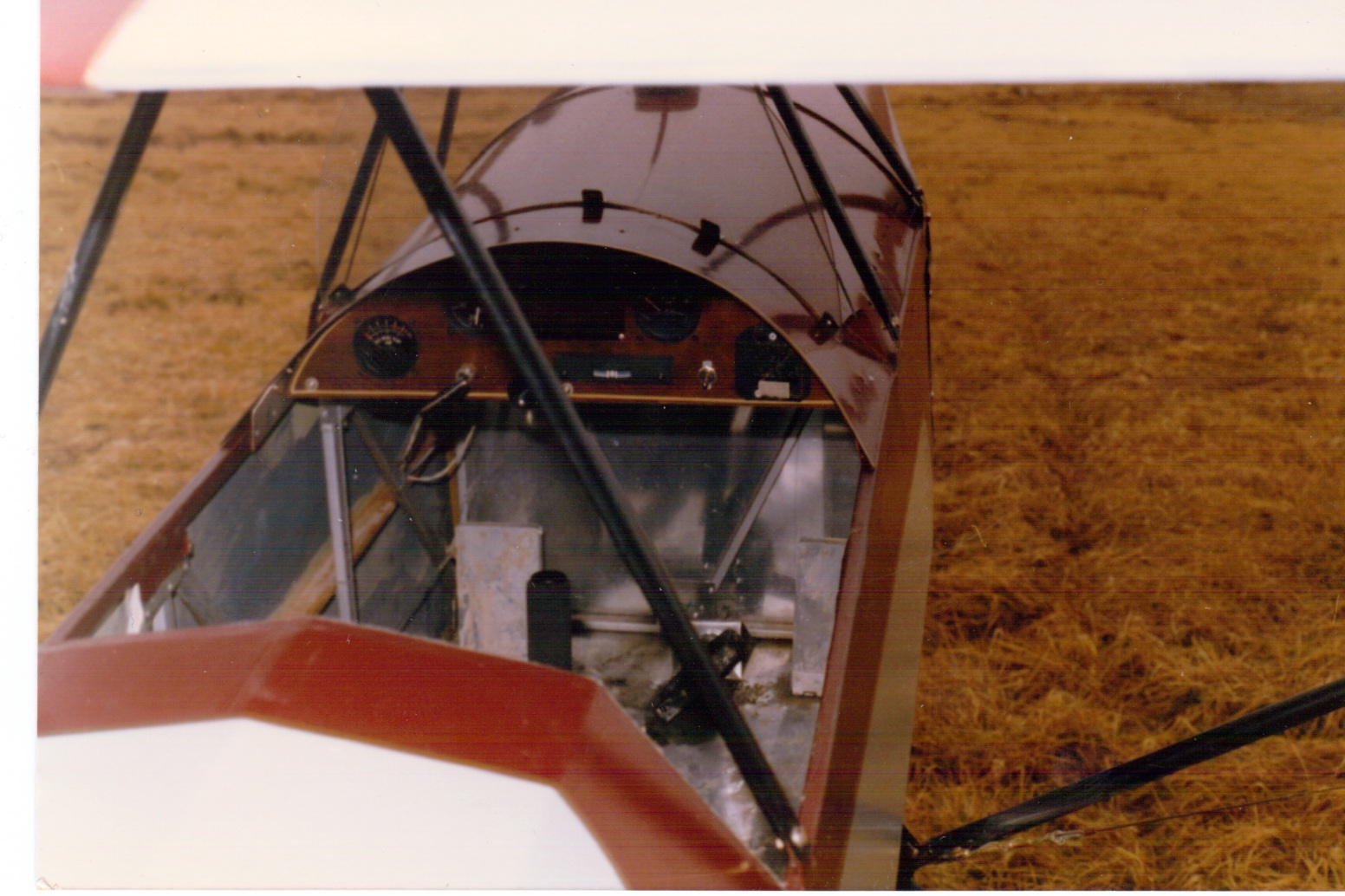
Aerotique Parasol

The Aerotique Parasol is an American ultralight aircraft that was designed as an ultralight version of the 1926 vintage Heath Parasol. The aircraft is a parasol-wing aircraft and is strut-braced, has conventional landing gear, a single seat, an open cockpit, and a single engine in tractor configuration. It was originally produced by Yesteryear Aviation and later by Aerotique Aviation. The aircraft was supplied as factory-built only.

== Design and development ==
The aircraft was designed to comply with the US FAR 103 Ultralight Vehicles rules, including the category's maximum empty weight of 254 lb (115 kg). The Parasol's factory standard empty weight was 242 lb (110 kg).

The aircraft's fuselage is built with an aluminium tube structure, with wooden wings, all covered with doped aircraft fabric covering. Early production models used wooden wing ribs, while later models transitioned to aluminium ribs. Its 32 ft (9.8 m) span wing uses parallel lift struts supported by jury struts and flying wires. The wings are removable for transportation or storage and take about an hour to remove. The factory installed engine was the Rotax 277, single cylinder, two-stroke powerplant of 28 hp (21 kW). Other than the engine and the wheels, all parts are certified aircraft parts.

The Parasol has conventional three-axis controls, including half-span ailerons. The main landing gear is bungee-suspended and the tail has a steerable skid. Brakes were optional and taxiing the aircraft without them was described as "a little tricky".

As is the case with many parasol designs where the pilot sits directly underneath the wing on the aircraft's center of gravity, the cockpit access is restricted by the close proximity of the wing.

== Specifications (Parasol) ==
Data from Cliche

General characteristics

- Crew: one
- Wingspan: 32 ft 0 in (9.75 m)
- Wing area: 144 sq ft (13.4 m^{2})
- Aspect ratio: 7.1
- Empty weight: 242 lb (110 kg)
- Gross weight: 520 lb (236 kg)
- Fuel capacity: 5 U.S. gallons (19 L; 4.2 imp gal)
- Powerplant: 1 × Rotax 277 single cylinder, two-stroke, 28 hp (21 kW)
- Propellers: 2-bladed wooden

Performance

- Maximum speed: 63 mph (101 km/h, 55 kn)
- Cruise speed: 58 mph (93 km/h, 50 kn)
- Stall speed: 24 mph (39 km/h, 21 kn)
- Never exceed speed: 78 mph (126 km/h, 68 kn)
- g limits: +6/-2.5
- Rate of climb: 700 ft/min (3.6 m/s)

== See also ==
Aircraft of comparable role, configuration, and era

- Fisher FP-505 Skeeter
- Loehle Sport Parasol
- Pietenpol Air Camper
- Pop's Props Cloudster
- Pop's Props Zing
- RagWing RW5 Heath Replica
