= Pioneer Airport =

Airport in Wisconsin, United States

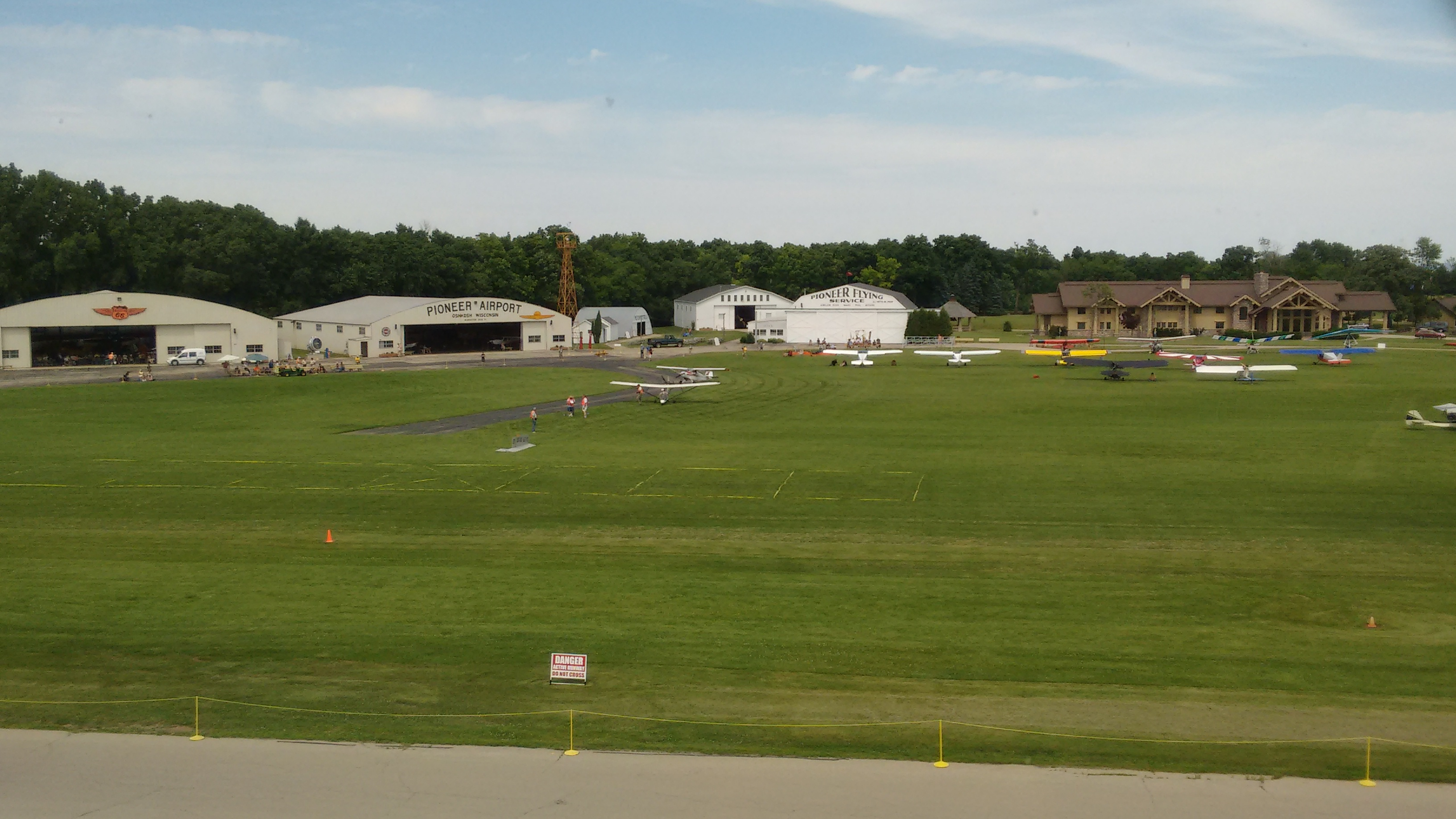
- An overview of the airport during Ultralight day

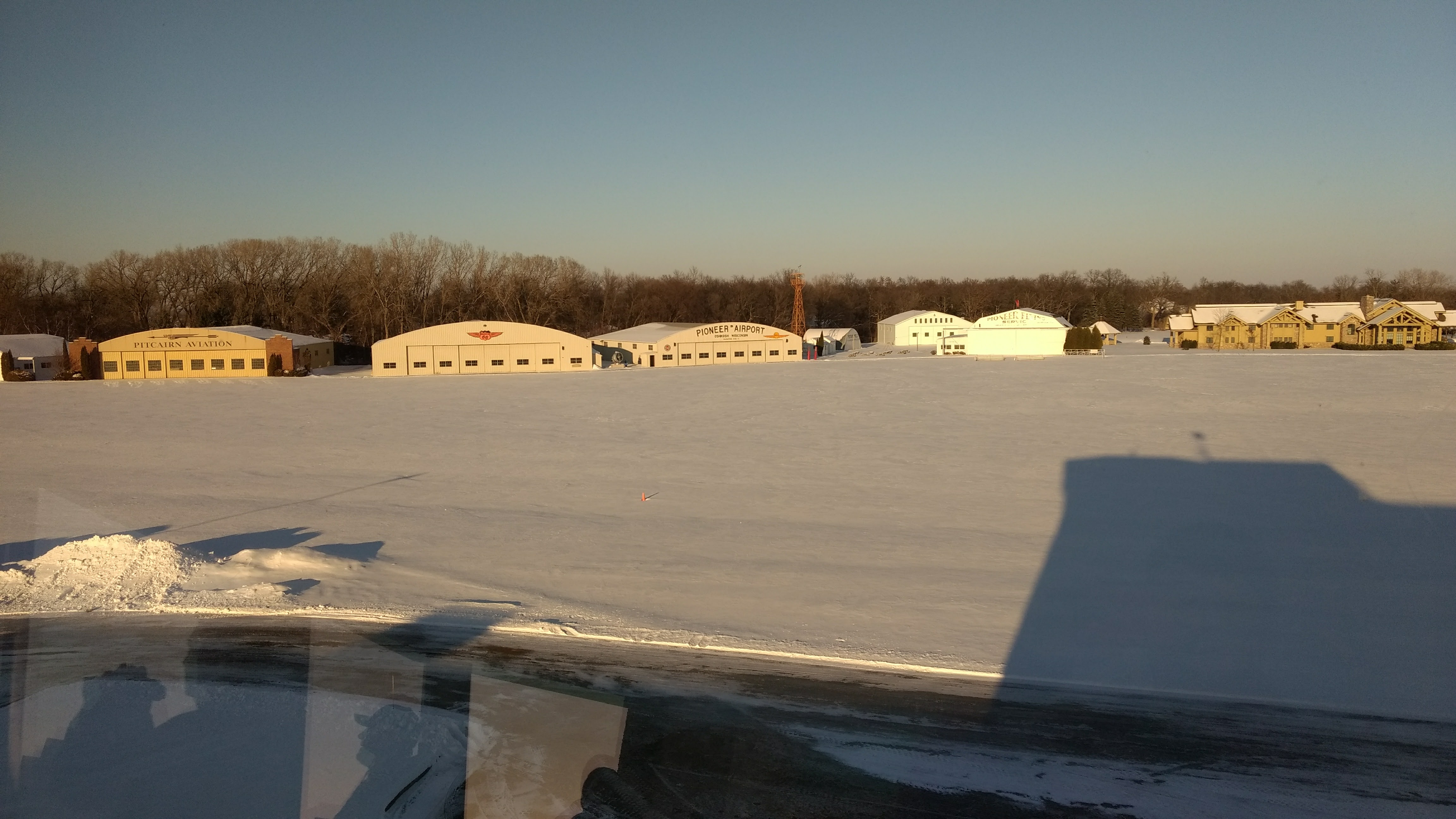
- Airport during the winter
- IATA: none; ICAO: none; FAA LID: WS17

Summary
- Airport type: Private
- Owner: Experimental Aircraft Association
- Serves: Oshkosh, Wisconsin
- Opened: October 1984
- Time zone: CST (UTC−06:00)
  - Summer (DST): CDT (UTC−05:00)
- Elevation AMSL: 826 ft (252 m)
- Coordinates: 43°59′22″N 088°34′42″W

Map
- Location of airport in Wisconsin WS17 (the United States)

Runways
Direction	Length		Surface
Direction	ft	m	Surface
13/31	1,988	606	Turf

Statistics
- Based aircraft (2024): 23
- Source: Federal Aviation Administration

Pioneer Airport (FAA LID: WS17) is a privately owned airport located two nautical miles (4 km) south of the central business district of Oshkosh, a city in Winnebago County, Wisconsin, United States. The airport is located on the northwest edge of Wittman Regional Airport, with which it co-hosts the EAA AirVenture Oshkosh airshow.

== Facilities and aircraft ==
Pioneer Airport is built to look like a 1930s period airfield. It has one turf runway: 13/31 is 1,988 by 130 feet (606 x 40 m). The venue covers an area of 15 acres (6 ha) at an elevation of 826 feet (252 m) above mean sea level.

In August 2024, there were 23 aircraft based at this airport: 20 single-engine airplanes, 1 multi-engine airplane, and 2 gliders.

On the north end, there are seven exhibit hangars, the Fergus Chapel and the Air Academy Lodge. On the south end is the EAA headquarters and museum. A flight service station relocated from Lone Rock, Wisconsin is also located at the airport.

The airport operates daily from Memorial Day to Labor Day, and on weekends in May and through mid October.

== EAA Museum ==
The airport is part of the EAA Aviation Museum. In the hangars are some of the oldest aircraft the museum has, including Golden Age (1920s-1930s) biplanes and vintage monoplanes such as Swallow and WACO biplanes, Travel Air, Curtiss Robin, Fairchild FC-2, Stinson Aircraft, Spartan C-3, Great Lakes 2T-1A acrobat, Aeronca K, Monocoupe, Howard DGA, Heath Parasol, Pietenpol Air Camper, and many others, most in special vintage-style hangars.

=== AirVenture ===
Despite the fact that the airport co-hosts EAA AirVenture Oshkosh along with Wittman Regional Airport, the airport's runway is closed during the event. Instead, the airport holds kids activities and hosts only arrival and departures of helicopters during AirVenture. It also has been where some blimps were shown during the event.

== See also ==
- List of airports in Wisconsin
