= St Croix Pietenpol Aircamper =

American homebuilt aircraft

General information
- Type: Homebuilt aircraft
- National origin: United States
- Manufacturer: St Croix Aircraft
- Status: Production completed

History
- Developed from: Pietenpol Air Camper
- Variant: St Croix Pietenpol Aerial

The St Croix Pietenpol Aircamper is an American homebuilt aircraft, an adaptation of the classic 1920s Pietenpol Air Camper, re-designed by St Croix Aircraft of Corning, Iowa. When it was available the aircraft was supplied as a partial kit and in the form of plans for amateur construction.

== Design and development ==
St Croix Aircraft principals Chad and Charles Wille had built several Pietenpol Air Campers starting in 1941. The St Croix version of the Pietenpol Aircamper is longer and heavier than the original design, with slightly more wingspan.

The St Croix Pietenpol Aircamper features a cantilever strut-braced parasol wing, two-seats in individual tandem open cockpits with windshields, fixed conventional landing gear and a single engine in tractor configuration.

The aircraft is made with a wooden structure, with some steel parts and its flying surfaces covered in doped aircraft fabric. Its 29.50 ft (9.0 m) span wing is supported by cabane struts and lift struts and has a wing area of 148.0 sq ft (13.75 m^{2}). The cabin width is 24 in (61 cm). The acceptable power range is 65 to 125 hp (48 to 93 kW) and the standard engine used is the 40 hp (30 kW) Ford Model A automotive conversion powerplant.

The St Croix Pietenpol Aircamper has a typical empty weight of 650 lb (290 kg) and a gross weight of 1,100 lb (500 kg), giving a useful load of 450 lb (200 kg). With full fuel of 12 U.S. gallons (45 L; 10.0 imp gal) the payload for the pilot, passenger and baggage is 378 lb (171 kg). The standard day, sea level, no wind, take off and landing roll with a 40 hp (30 kW) engine is 750 ft (229 m). The designer estimated the construction time from the supplied partial kit and plans as 1000 hours.

The design was later further developed into a biplane, by adding lower wings to the parasol Aircamper, resulting in the St Croix Pietenpol Aerial.

== Specifications (St Croix Pietenpol Aircamper) ==
Data from AeroCrafter

General characteristics

- Crew: one
- Capacity: one passenger
- Length: 19 ft 6 in (5.94 m)
- Wingspan: 29 ft 6 in (8.99 m)
- Wing area: 148 sq ft (13.7 m^{2})
- Empty weight: 650 lb (295 kg)
- Gross weight: 1,100 lb (499 kg)
- Fuel capacity: 12 U.S. gallons (45 L; 10.0 imp gal)
- Powerplant: 1 × Ford Model A four cylinder, liquid-cooled, four stroke automotive conversion engine, 40 hp (30 kW)
- Propellers: 2-bladed wooden fixed pitch

Performance

- Maximum speed: 105 mph (169 km/h, 91 kn)
- Cruise speed: 70 mph (110 km/h, 61 kn)
- Stall speed: 40 mph (64 km/h, 35 kn)
- Rate of climb: 500 ft/min (2.5 m/s)
- Wing loading: 7.4 lb/sq ft (36 kg/m^{2})
