= Smith Termite =

Homebuilt aircraft model

Smith Special "Termite"
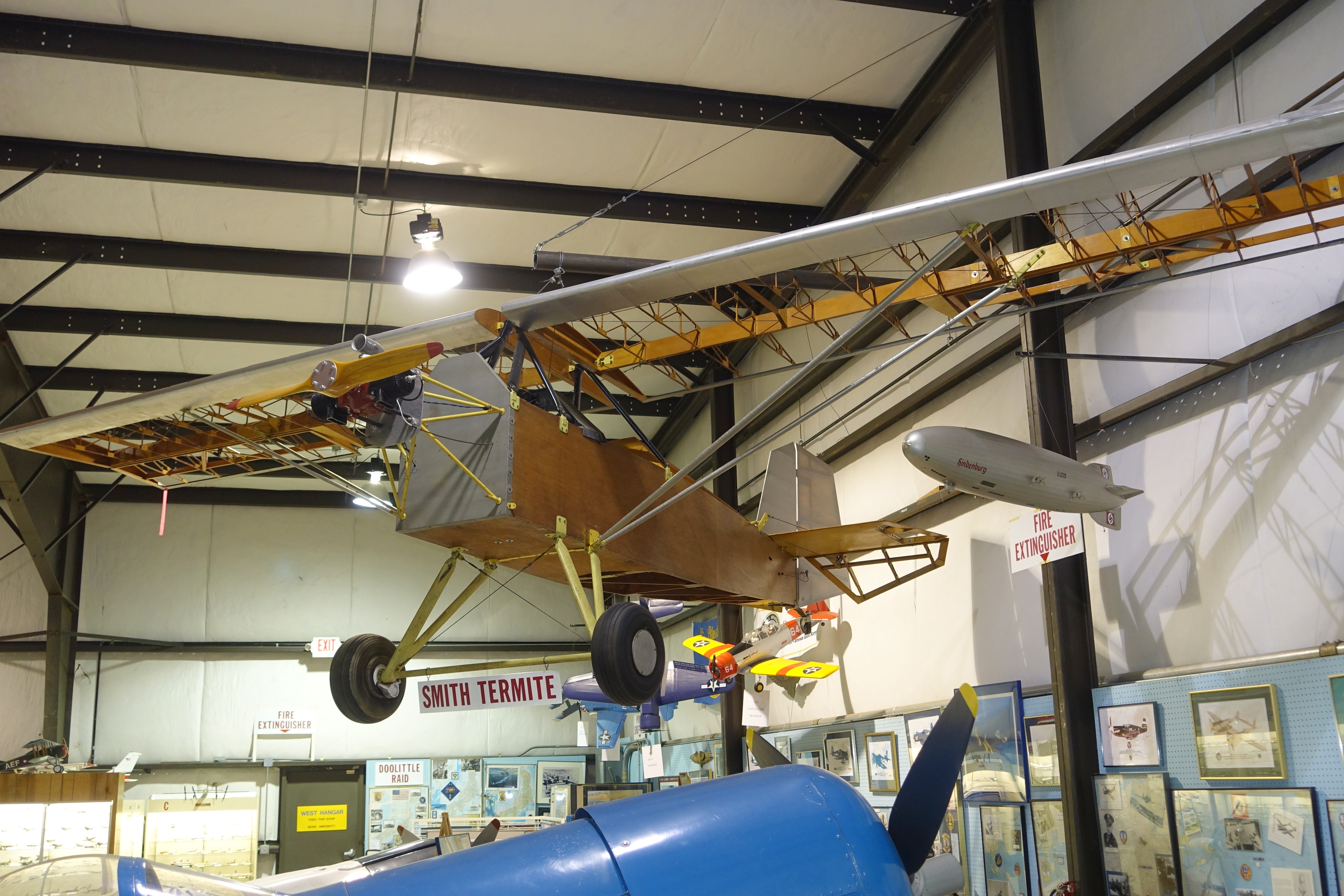
- Smith Termite in the Oregon Air and Space Museum

General information
- Type: Single-seat Homebuilt aircraft
- National origin: United States
- Manufacturer: Termite Aircraft
- Designer: Wilbur L. Smith

History
- First flight: Feb 10 1957

The Smith Special also known as "Smitty's Termite" or simply the Smith Termite is a single place homebuilt aircraft built primarily out of wood.

== Design and development ==
Wilbur L. Smith, was an experienced wooden construction aircraft homebuilder, having built a Pietenpol Sky Scout in 1930. He designed the Termite using chalk on a basement floor. Don Cookman later drew up the plans.

The aircraft is a braced parasol wing monoplane with all-wood construction. The exception being the motor mount, struts and landing gear are made out of steel. It was designed to use an engine from an Aeronca aircraft. Spruce was used as the structural material with birch plywood covering. The spars are from an Aeronca K. The controls are modified from a Piper Cub. The aircraft does not have brakes or a tailwheel.

== Operational history ==
A Continental A-40 was installed after an engine failure resulted in a forced landing, flipping the aircraft on its back during testing.

== Aircraft on display ==
The Smith Special "Termite" is displayed at the Oregon Air & Space Museum in Eugene, Oregon. The fabric covering has been removed to show the all wood construction.

== Specifications (Smith Special "Termite") ==
Data from Sport Aviation

General characteristics

- Capacity: 1
- Length: 16 ft 5 in (5.00 m)
- Wingspan: 23 ft (7.0 m)
- Airfoil: Clark Y
- Empty weight: 394 lb (179 kg)
- Gross weight: 628 lb (285 kg)
- Powerplant: 1 × Aeronca E113-C , 36 hp (27 kW)
- Propellers: 2-bladed

Performance

- Maximum speed: 81 kn (93 mph, 150 km/h)
- Cruise speed: 70 kn (80 mph, 130 km/h)
- Stall speed: 28 kn (32 mph, 51 km/h)
- Range: 170 nmi (200 mi, 320 km)
- Service ceiling: 8,000 ft (2,400 m)
- Rate of climb: 450 ft/min (2.3 m/s)

== See also ==
Aircraft of comparable role, configuration, and era

- Pietenpol Air Camper
