= Edward Bayard Heath =

American aerospace engineer

- Born: November 17, 1888; Brooklyn, New York
- Died: February 1, 1931 (aged 42); Maine Township, Cook County, Illinois
- Employer: Glen Curtiss
- Known for: Heath Parasol, E.B. Heath Aerial Vehicle Co.
- Spouse: Berna Heath
- Parent(s): Clark Heath; Ada M. Johnson

Edward Bayard Heath (November 17, 1888 – November 1, 1931) was an American Aircraft engineer.

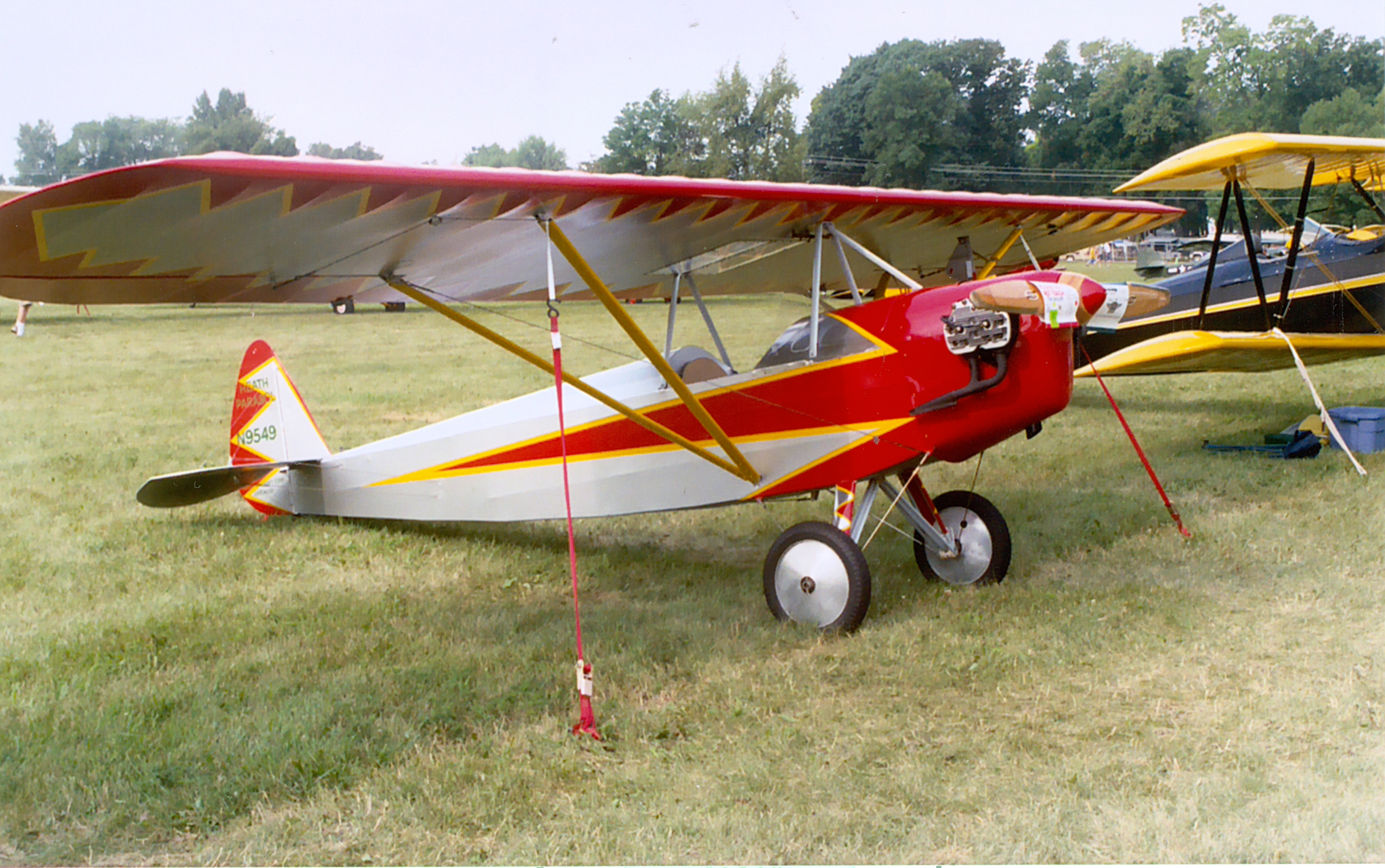
a Heath Parasol on display

== Biography ==
He was born on November 17, 1888, in Brooklyn, New York, to Clark Heath and Ada M. Johnson.

Heath designed and built a series of aircraft starting in 1909 with a Bleriot-inspired monoplane. His first flight was on 10 October 1909 in Amsterdam, New York, resulting in a broken landing gear. On July 4, 1910, Heath made $500 in appearance fees and $200 in photograph revenues from his aircraft that flew at 3 feet above the ground.

In 1911 Heath went to work for Glen Curtiss in Hammondsport, New York, as a motorcycle mechanic, next to the Curtiss aircraft factory where he built a second aircraft with Walter Eales making short aerial runs. After purchasing the Chicago-based Bates Aeroplane Company in 1912, Heath founded the E.B. Heath Aerial Vehicle Co., later becoming the Heath Airplane Company.

His company produced the Heath Feather and Heath Favorite after World War I, and later the Heath Parasol series of aircraft powered with Henderson Motorcycle engines.

Heath died on February 1, 1931, in Maine Township, Cook County, Illinois. He was in an aircraft accident while testing a new low-wing aircraft design.

== Legacy ==
Heath's company was eventually purchased and after World War II, changed its product to kit electronics. Heathkit filed for bankruptcy and closed in 2012.
