= Oregon Air and Space Museum =

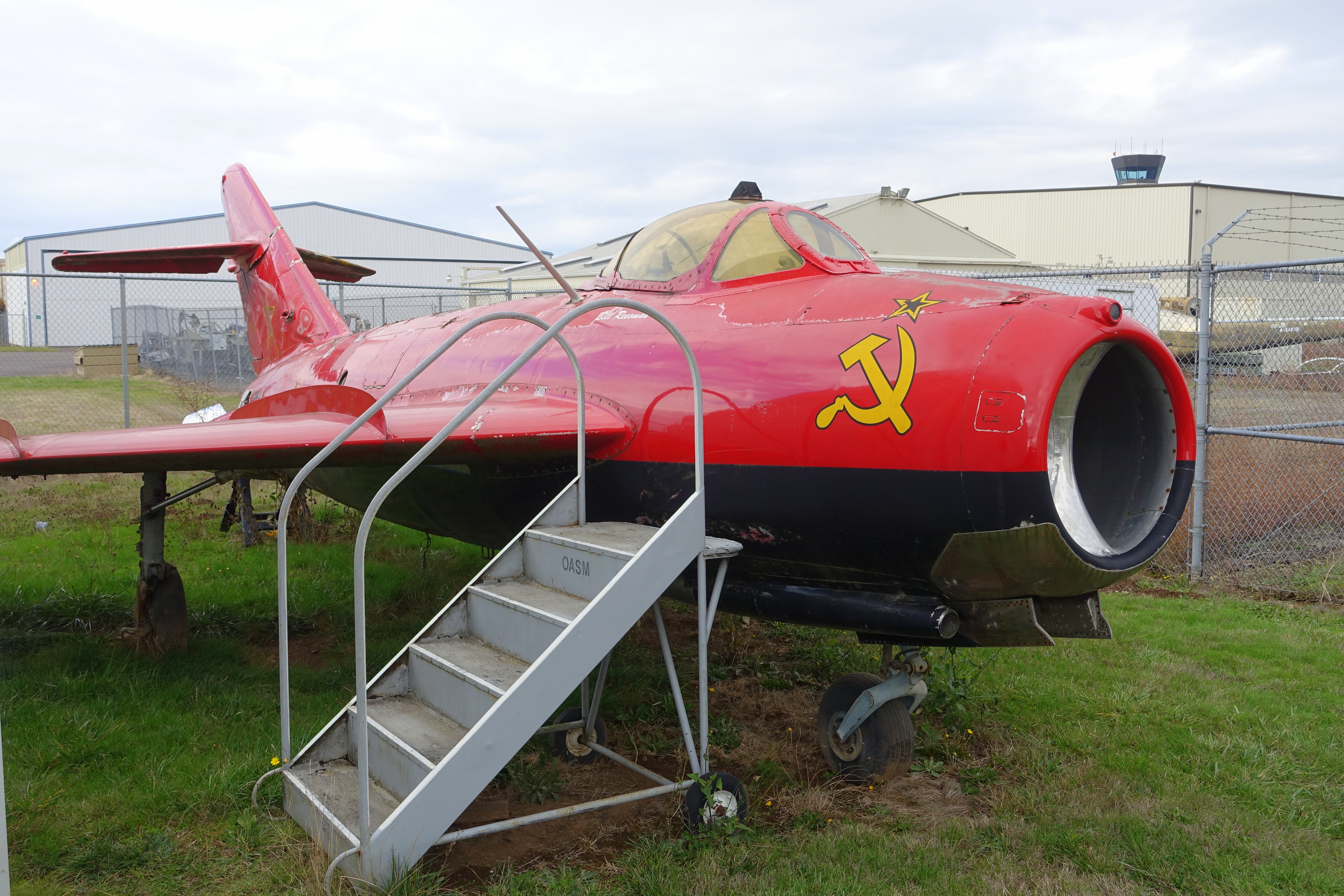
- Shenyang J-5, Oregon Air and Space Museum
- Established: Built in 1991
- Location: 90377 Boeing Drive, Eugene, Oregon
- Coordinates: 44.1151°N 123.2126°W
- Type: Aviation museum
- Website: https://www.oasmuseum.org/

The Oregon Air and Space Museum, located on the grounds of the Eugene Airport in Eugene, Oregon, holds a collection of historic aircraft and spacecraft.

== History ==
The museum opened in 1991. The museum expanded its facilities in 1999 with a 6300 square foot (585 m^{2}) addition.

== Exhibits ==
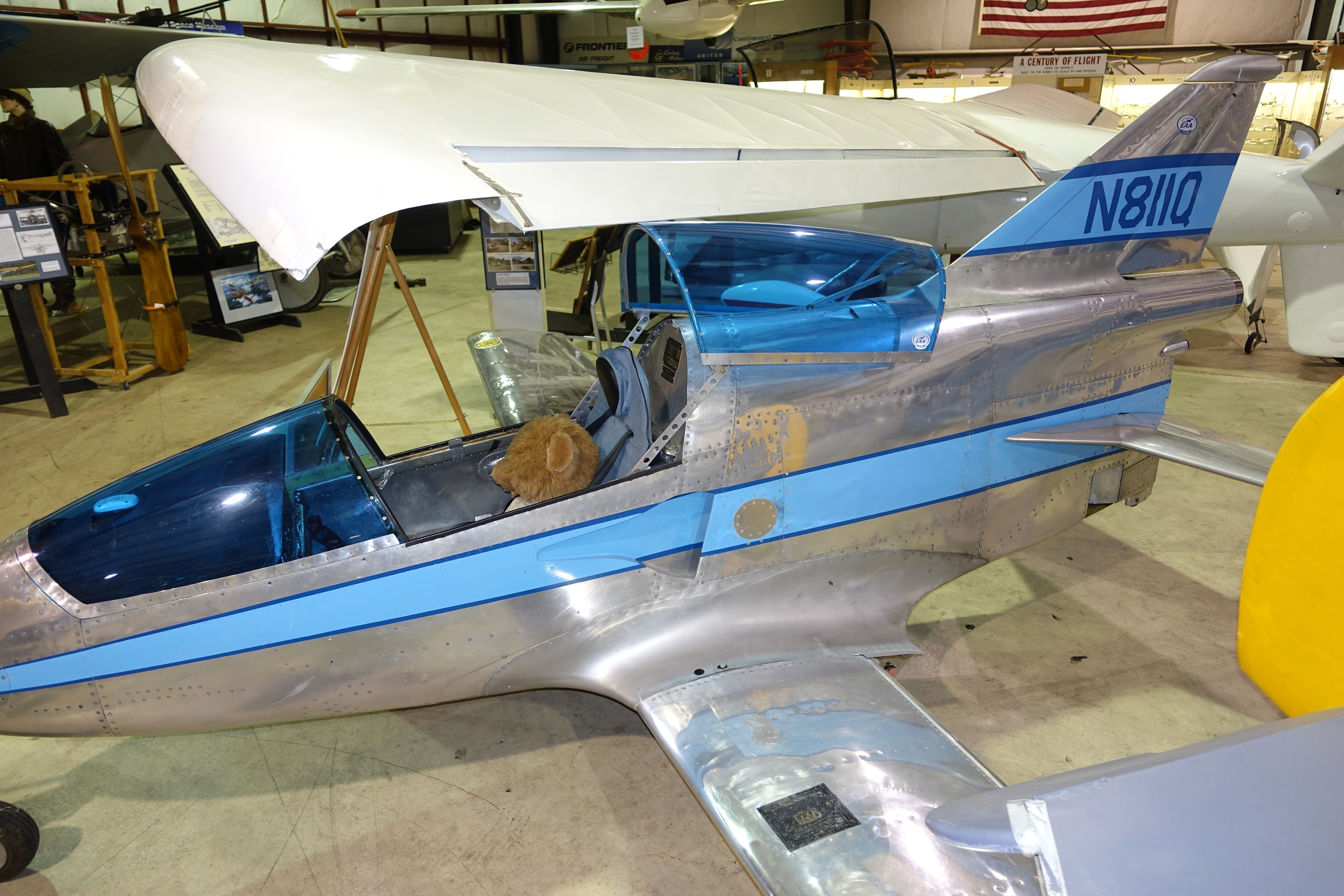
Bede BD-5J

The museum features aircraft with an emphasis on Oregon's aerospace history.

Displays include

- Globe Swift
- Nieuport 17
- Rutan Quickie
- Grumman A-6E Intruder
- McDonnell Douglas A-4 Skyhawk
- Mitchell Wing B-10
- MiG-17
- Smith Termite
- Pratt & Whitney R-4360 Wasp Major dynamic functioning display
- 1000+ 1:72 model aircraft display

== See also ==
- List of aerospace museums
