= Pop's Props Zing =

American homebuilt light aircraft

Zing

General information
- Type: Kit aircraft
- National origin: United States
- Manufacturer: Pop's Props; Simplex Aeroplanes
- Designer: Scott Land
- Status: In production
- Number built: 5 (1998)

History
- First flight: 1996
- Developed from: Pop's Props Cloudster

The Pop's Props Zing is a single seat, open-cockpit, parasol wing, single-engine monoplane, first flown in 1996. The aircraft was designed by Scott Land and produced by Pop's Props of Cooksville, Illinois in the form of plans and an aircraft kit. The company is no longer in business and the aircraft kit is now available from Simplex Aeroplanes of Old Saybrook, Connecticut.

The aircraft was designed for the FAR 103 Ultralight Vehicles category, including the category's 254 lb (115 kg) empty weight limit. The standard empty weight of the Zing is 249 lb (113 kg).

== Design and development ==
The Zing was designed as a higher performance version of the Cloudster, with a smaller wing with a span 4.5 ft (1.4 m) less than the Cloudster, yielding higher cruise speeds at the price of a higher stall speed.

The Zing is constructed of wood and covered in aircraft fabric. The landing gear is conventional with sprung aluminum main gear and a steerable tailwheel. The double surfaced wing is strut-braced with two parallel main struts and jury struts per side. The wing features 60% span ailerons and the whole wing can be removed for transport or storage. Available engines include the Kawasaki 340-LC liquid-cooled engine of 35 hp (26 kW), the Half VW of 45 hp (34 kW) as well as several Rotax engines. The designer recommended power range is 28 to 40 hp (21 to 30 kW).

Due to the laborious wood and fabric construction, builder completion time is estimated at 300-500 man-hours from plans or 200 man-hours from the kit. The kit is available as a single kit or as several sub-kits.

== Specifications (Zing) ==
Data from Cliche, Purdy and Kitplanes

General characteristics

- Crew: One
- Length: 17 ft 0 in (5.18 m)
- Wingspan: 25 ft 5 in (7.75 m)
- Height: 5 ft 10 in (1.78 m)
- Wing area: 118.8 sq ft (11.04 m^{2})
- Empty weight: 249 lb (113 kg)
- Gross weight: 500 lb (227 kg)
- Fuel capacity: 5 US gallons (19 litres)
- Powerplant: 1 × Kawasaki 340-LC , 35 hp (26 kW)
- Propellers: 2-bladed wooden propeller

Performance

- Maximum speed: 70 mph (110 km/h, 61 kn)
- Cruise speed: 55 mph (89 km/h, 48 kn)
- Stall speed: 26 mph (42 km/h, 23 kn)
- Range: 140 mi (220 km, 120 nmi)
- Service ceiling: 6,000 ft (1,800 m)
- Rate of climb: 675 ft/min (3.43 m/s)
- Wing loading: 4.2 lb/sq ft (21 kg/m^{2})

Avionics

- none

== See also ==
Aircraft of comparable role, configuration, and era

- Aerotique Parasol
- Fisher FP-505 Skeeter
- Heath Parasol
- Loehle Sport Parasol
- Pietenpol Air Camper
