= St Croix Aircraft =

American aerospace manufacturer

- Industry: Aerospace
- Fate: Out of business
- Headquarters: Corning, Iowa, United States
- Products: Aircraft propellers, aircraft plans and kit aircraft

St Croix Aircraft, was an American manufacturer of wooden propellers for homebuilt and ultralight aircraft and a supplier of aircraft plans and kits. The company headquarters was located in Corning, Iowa.

The company's propellers were constructed from birch, maple and walnut and available in with two to five blades, in diameters up to 120 in (3.05 m) for engines up to 400 hp (298 kW)

St Croix is probably best known for its Excelsior ultralight aircraft design.

== Aircraft ==
- Aerial
- AirCamper
- Excelsior
- Sopwith Triplane

== See also ==
- List of aircraft propeller manufacturers
