= RagWing RW1 Ultra-Piet =

Family of single seat, single engine ultralight aircraft

General information
- Type: Ultralight aircraft
- National origin: United States
- Manufacturer: Ragwing Aircraft Designs
- Designer: Roger Mann
- Status: Plans available (2015)
- Number built: 22 (January 1999)

History
- First flight: 1994 (RW5 & RW6)

The RagWing RW1 Ultra-Piet is a family of single seat, parasol wing, single engine ultralight aircraft designed by Roger Mann and sold as plans by RagWing Aircraft Designs for amateur construction.

== Design and development ==
The RW1 was designed as an FAR 103 Ultralight Vehicles compliant aircraft that would have an empty weight within that category's 254 lb (115 kg) empty weight limit. The RW1 was designed as a 3/4 scale ultralight version of the classic 1920s vintage Pietenpol Air Camper.

The airframe is constructed entirely from wood and covered with aircraft fabric. The landing gear is of conventional configuration and the wings are detachable. The aircraft's installed power range is 24 to 48 hp (18 to 36 kW) and the standard engine was originally the 38 hp (28 kW) Kawasaki 440. The Volkswagen air-cooled engine has been used, as well as the 35 hp (26 kW) Half VW and 35 hp (26 kW) 2si 460.

Partial kits and construction kits were available in the late 1990s, but today the series are only offered as plans. Reported construction time is 300–500 hours.

The same basic airframe design was also used to produce the RW5 which is a replica of the Heath Parasol and the RW6 Rag-A-Muffin.

== Variants ==
RW1 Ultra-Piet
Ultralight replica of the Pietenpol Air Camper.
RW5 Heath Replica
Full sized ultralight replica of the Heath Parasol, first flown in 1994.
RW6 Rag-A-Muffin (formerly the Sport Parasol)
Ultralight replica of the Pietenpol Air Camper for short and rough fields and with extra stowage, first flown in 1994.

== Specifications (RW1) ==
Data from Kitplanes, Purdy and RagWing

General characteristics

- Crew: one
- Length: 15 ft 0 in (4.57 m)
- Wingspan: 25 ft 6 in (7.77 m)
- Height: 5 ft 10 in (1.78 m)
- Wing area: 1,260 sq ft (117 m^{2})
- Empty weight: 254 lb (115 kg)
- Gross weight: 550 lb (249 kg)
- Fuel capacity: 5 US gallons (19 litres)
- Powerplant: 1 × 2si 460 twin cylinder two stroke aircraft engine, 35 hp (26 kW)
- Propellers: 2-bladed wooden

Performance

- Cruise speed: 55 mph (89 km/h, 48 kn)
- Stall speed: 24 mph (39 km/h, 21 kn)
- Never exceed speed: 85 mph (137 km/h, 74 kn)
- Range: 125 mi (201 km, 109 nmi)
- Service ceiling: 10,000 ft (3,000 m)
- g limits: +4/-2
- Rate of climb: 650 ft/min (3.3 m/s)

== See also ==
Aircraft of comparable role, configuration, and era

- Aerotique Parasol
