= Pietenpol Air Camper =

Homebuilt aircraft

Air Camper
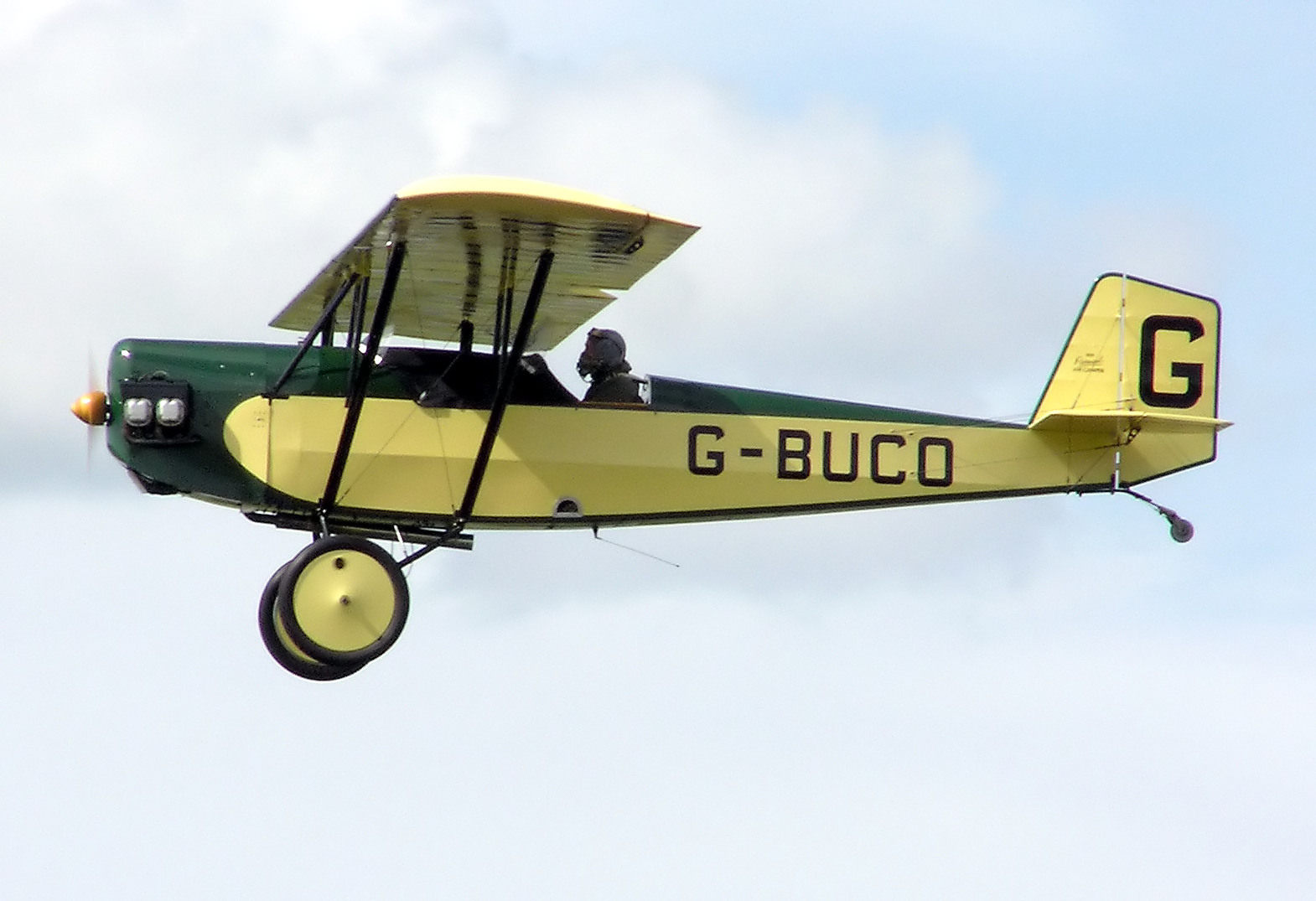
- UK variant Pietenpol Air Camper

General information
- Type: Amateur-built airplane
- Manufacturer: Pietenpol
- Designer: Bernie Pietenpol
- Status: Plans available (2015)

History
- First flight: 1928 with Model A engine, May 1929
- Variants: Grega GN-1 Aircamper; Pietenpol Sky Scout; St Croix Pietenpol Aerial; St Croix Pietenpol Aircamper

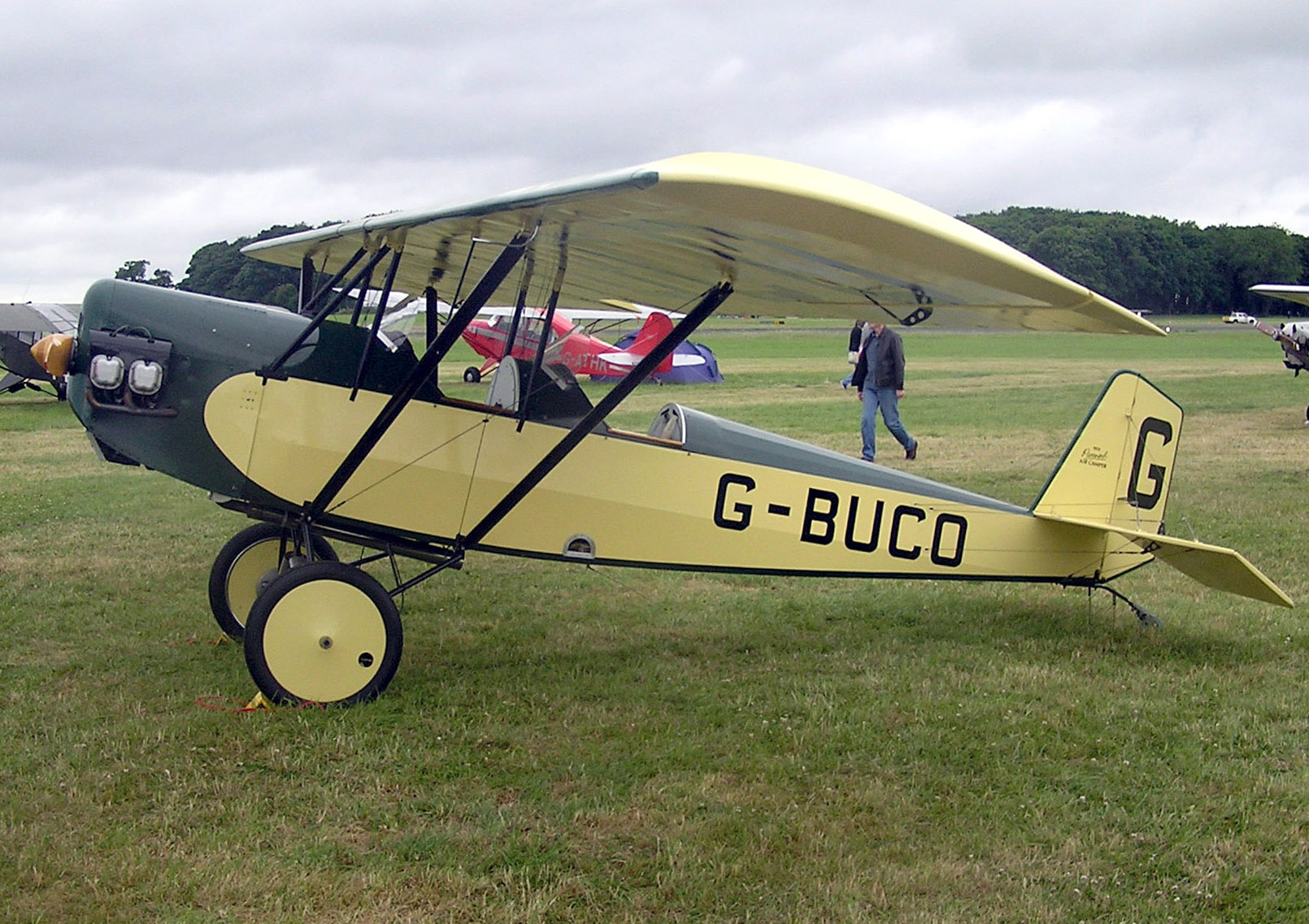
UK variant Pietenpol Air Camper

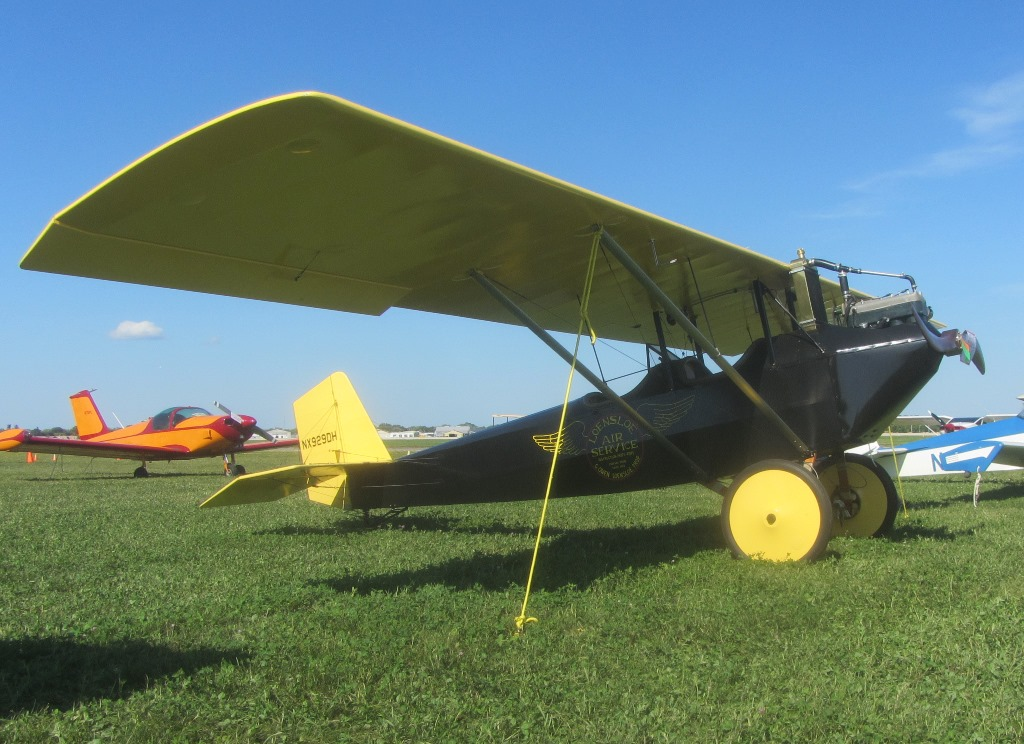
Air Camper with a Ford Model A engine

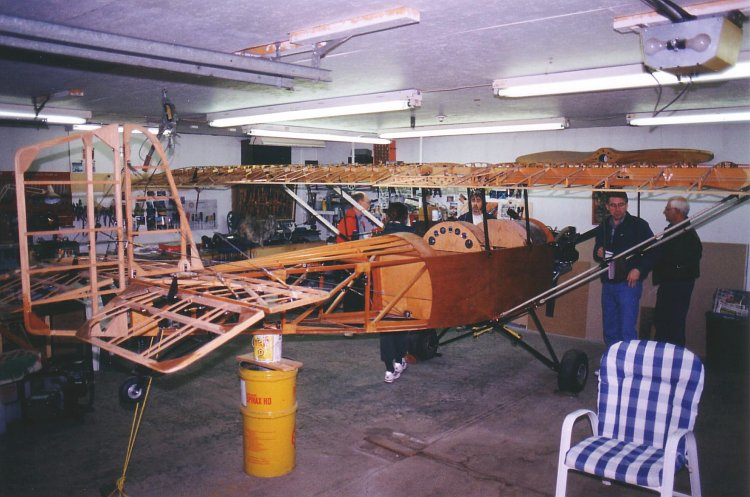
A Pietenpol Air Camper under construction, showing its wooden frame structure.

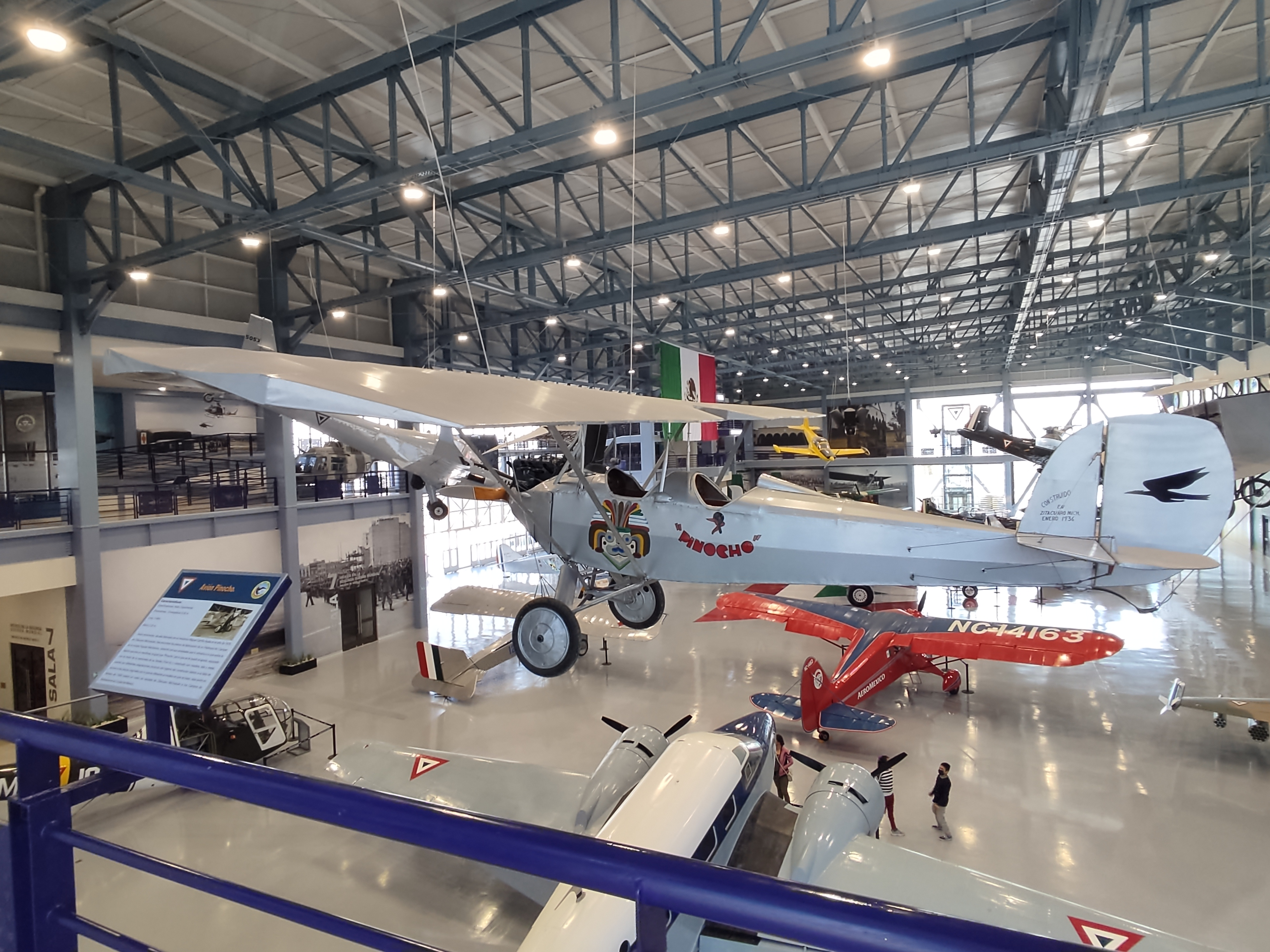
"Pinocho", an Air Camper made in Mexico by Miguel Carrillo Ayala in 1935 and now in the Museo Militar de Aviación. Powered by a 201 CID engine of a Ford Model A.

The Pietenpol Air Camper is a simple parasol-wing homebuilt aircraft designed by Bernard H. Pietenpol. The first prototype that became the Air Camper was built and flown by Pietenpol in 1928.

== Development ==
The Air Camper was designed to be built of spruce and plywood. One of Pietenpol's goals was to create a plane that was affordable and easy to construct for home builders. Building an Air Camper requires basic woodworking skills and tools. Builders also need to fabricate some metal fittings to attach the wooden parts. Some welding is required. The plans for the Pietenpol Air Camper were originally published in a four-part serial in the "Flying and Glider" Manual of 1932-33.

The original model was flown using an Ace four-cylinder, water-cooled engine. The Model A Ford engine later became the standard powerplant used; the design was first flown with one in May 1929.

In the 1960s, Bernard Pietenpol began to favor converted engines from Chevrolet Corvair automobiles. The Corvair flat six engine was higher horsepower, smoother, and significantly lighter compared to the Model A and was similar to those already available for general aviation use. The length of a Pietenpol varies with the engine choices, as lighter engines needed to be mounted further forward for weight and balance reasons. Over the years over 30 different engines have flown in the Pietenpol Air Camper. Many modern Pietenpol builders prefer Continental A65, C85 or C90 air-cooled flat fours. Several examples of the Air Camper have been built in Europe and in 2012 were still flying.

In the 1920s and 1930s, kits were available for the design, but none were available again until 2015, when the Pietenpol Aircraft Company introduced a kit version of the Air Camper, with components supplied by Aircraft Spruce & Specialty. The kit includes all parts except the engine, dope, fabric covering, and hardware.

== Variants ==
Pietenpol Sky Scout
BH Pietenpol also designed and published plans for a single-seat version of the aircraft named the Pietenpol Sky Scout, which was slightly smaller and was powered by the Ford Model T engine. During the late 1920s and early 1930s, this was less expensive than the Model A used in the Air Camper.
UK LAA-approved Pietenpol Air Camper
In some countries, civilian aviation authority approval is required for each experimental aircraft design, in addition to the approval of each aircraft an individual makes, as in the U.S. A variant of the Pietenpol Air Camper was designed by Mr. J. K. Wills, and UK Light Aircraft Association approval was obtained for this variant.

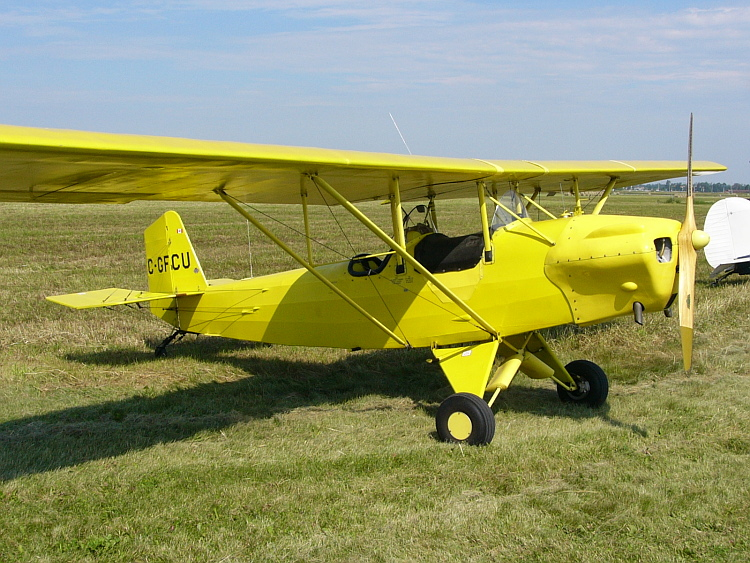
Grega GN-1 Aircamper

Grega GN-1 Aircamper
A plans-only homebuilt design similar to the Aircamper using a Piper Cub wing
St Croix Pietenpol Aerial
A biplane adaptation, designed by Chad and Charles Willie and produced by St Croix Aircraft of Corning, Iowa, first flown in 1977
St Croix Pietenpol Aircamper
An adaptation of the original design with more wingspan, longer fuselage and higher gross weight

== Specifications (typical) ==
Data from "How to Build a Pietenpol Air Camper or Sky Scout Airplane". Pietenpol Aircraft Company.

General characteristics

- Crew: One pilot
- Capacity: One passenger
- Length: 17 ft 8 in (5.39 m)
- Wingspan: 28 ft 2 in (8.59 m)
- Height: 6 ft 6 in (1.98 m)
- Wing area: 140 sq ft (13.01 m^{2})
- Empty weight: 625 lb (283.5 kg)
- Gross weight: 995 lb (452 kg)
- Max takeoff weight: 1,080 lb (490 kg)
- Powerplant: 1 × Ford Model A automotive conversion engine , 40 hp (30 kW)

Performance

- Maximum speed: 78.2 kn (90 mph, 144.8 km/h)
- Stall speed: 30.4 kn (35 mph, 56.3 km/h)
- Rate of climb: 500 ft/min (2.5 m/s)
- Wing loading: 7.7 lb/sq ft (37.6 kg/m^{2})

== See also ==
Aircraft of comparable role, configuration, and era

- Aerotique Parasol
- Dormoy Bathtub
- Fisher FP-505 Skeeter
- Heath Parasol
- Letov Š 39
- Loehle Sport Parasol
- Long Henderson Longster
- Pop's Props Cloudster
- Pop's Props Zing
- RagWing RW1 Ultra-Piet
- Smith Termite

Related lists

- List of civil aircraft
