= Pop's Props Cloudster =

American homebuilt light aircraft

General information
- Type: Kit aircraft
- National origin: United States
- Manufacturer: Pop's Props; Simplex Aeroplanes
- Designer: Scott Land
- Status: In production
- Number built: 3 (1998)

History
- Introduction date: 1995
- First flight: 1995
- Variant: Pop's Props Zing

The Pop's Props Cloudster is a single seat, open-cockpit, parasol wing, single-engine monoplane, that was first flown in 1995. The aircraft was produced by Pop's Props of Cooksville, Illinois and made available as plans or in kit form. The company is no longer in business and kit production has been transferred to Simplex Aeroplanes of Old Saybrook, Connecticut.

The aircraft was designed for the FAR 103 Ultralight Vehicles category, including the category's 254 lb (115 kg) empty weight limit. The standard empty weight of the Cloudster is 250 lb (113 kg).

== Design and development ==
The aircraft was designed for safe low and slow flying from unimproved surfaces.

The Cloudster is constructed of wood and covered in aircraft fabric. The landing gear is conventional with sprung main gear and a tailwheel. The wing is strut-braced with two parallel main struts and jury struts per side. Available engines include the liquid-cooled engine Kawasaki 340-LC of 35 hp (26 kW), the Half VW of 45 hp (34 kW) as well as several Rotax and Cuyuna engines. The designer recommended power range is 28 to 40 hp (21 to 30 kW).

Due to the laborious wood and fabric construction, builder completion time is estimated at 400 man-hours from the kit. The kit can be ordered as one kit or as several sub-kits.

The Cloudster was later developed into the Zing.

== Variants ==
Pop's Props Cloudster
Original version with 30 ft (9.1 m) wingspan and 22 mph (35 km/h) stall speed.
Simplex Cloudster
Improved version with 28 ft (8.5 m) wingspan and 25 mph (40 km/h) stall speed introduced in February 2011. The wing was shortened to reduced adverse yaw effects.

== Specifications (Pop's Props Cloudster) ==
Data from Cliche, Purdy and Kitplanes

General characteristics

- Crew: One
- Length: 16 ft 6 in (5.03 m)
- Wingspan: 30 ft 0 in (9.14 m)
- Height: 7 ft 0 in (2.13 m)
- Wing area: 138 sq ft (12.8 m^{2})
- Empty weight: 250 lb (113 kg)
- Gross weight: 500 lb (227 kg)
- Fuel capacity: 2.5 US gallons (9.5 litres)
- Powerplant: 1 × Kawasaki 340-LC , 35 hp (26 kW)
- Propellers: 2-bladed wooden propeller

Performance

- Maximum speed: 60 mph (97 km/h, 52 kn)
- Cruise speed: 50 mph (80 km/h, 43 kn)
- Stall speed: 22 mph (35 km/h, 19 kn)
- Range: 86 mi (139 km, 75 nmi)
- Service ceiling: 6,000 ft (1,800 m)
- Rate of climb: 650 ft/min (3.3 m/s)
- Wing loading: 3.6 lb/sq ft (18 kg/m^{2})

Avionics

- none

== See also ==
- Douglas Cloudster - another aircraft with the same name
- Rearwin Cloudster - another aircraft with the same name

Aircraft of comparable role, configuration, and era

- Aerotique Parasol
- Fisher FP-505 Skeeter
- Heath Parasol
- Loehle Sport Parasol
- Pietenpol Air Camper
