= Fisher FP-505 Skeeter =

Canadian homebuilt light aircraft

FP-505 Skeeter

General information
- Type: Kit aircraft
- National origin: Canada
- Manufacturer: Fisher Flying Products
- Number built: 45 (2011)

History
- Introduction date: 1984
- First flight: 1984

The Fisher FP-505 Skeeter is a Canadian single-seat, conventional landing gear, single-engine parasol-wing monoplane kit aircraft designed for construction by amateur builders. Fisher Flying Products was originally based in Edgeley, North Dakota, United States, but the company is now located in Woodbridge, Ontario, Canada.

== Development ==
The FP-505 was designed by Fisher Aircraft in the United States in 1984 and was intended to comply with the US FAR 103 Ultralight Vehicles category, with the category's maximum 254 lb (115 kg) empty weight. The 505's standard empty weight is 245 lb (111 kg) when equipped with a two-stroke 28 hp (21 kW) Rotax 277 engine. The design goal was to provide a nostalgic 1930s-style parasol similar in configuration to the Pietenpol Air Camper or Heath Parasol that would be easy to fly, with a high wing and an open cockpit.

The construction of the FP-505 is of wood, with the fuselage built from wood strips arranged in a geodesic form, resulting in a very strong and light aircraft with redundant load paths. The wings, tail and fuselage are covered with doped aircraft fabric. The wings are strut-braced with both jury struts and cabane struts. The aircraft has no flaps. The conventional-configuration landing gear is bungee suspended. The company claims it takes an amateur builder 500 hours to build the FP-505.

Early versions of the FP-505 were equipped with the 28 hp (21 kW) Rotax 277, and the aircraft reportedly flies well on that minimum power. Since the Rotax 277 is no longer in production, the 25 hp (19 kW) Hirth F-33 is specified along with the 40 hp (30 kW) Rotax 447 and 50 hp (37 kW) Rotax 503 engines.

By late 2011 over 45 FP-505s were flying.

== Specifications (FP-505) ==
Data from Company website, AeroCrafter, Kitplanes and Cliche

General characteristics

- Crew: one
- Capacity: 250 lb (113 kg) useful load, no passengers
- Length: 16 ft 6 in (5.03 m)
- Wingspan: 28 ft 0 in (8.54 m)
- Height: 5 ft 9 in (1.77 m)
- Wing area: 112 sq ft (10.42 m^{2})
- Empty weight: 250 lb (113 kg)
- Max takeoff weight: 500 lb (226 kg)
- Powerplant: 1 × Rotax 503 Twin cylinder, two-stroke piston engine, 50 hp (37 kW)

Performance

- Cruise speed: 60 mph (97 km/h, 52 kn)
- Stall speed: 26 mph (42 km/h, 23 kn)
- Never exceed speed: 83 mph (134 km/h, 72 kn)
- Rate of climb: 800 ft/min (4.1 m/s)
- Wing loading: 4.5 lb/sq ft (21.95 kg/m^{2})
- Power/mass: 10.0 lb/hp (0.16 kW/kg)

== See also ==
Aircraft of comparable role, configuration, and era

- Aerotique Parasol
- Avid Champion
- Heath Parasol
- Pietenpol Air Camper
- Pop's Props Cloudster
- Pop's Props Zing
