= Heath Parasol =

American homebuilt monoplane

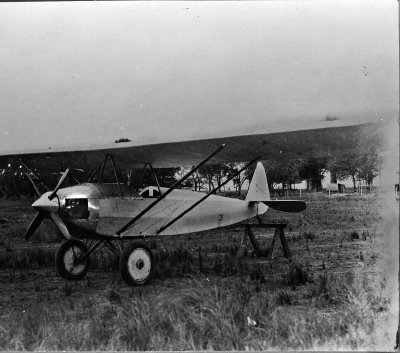
- Parasol, photographed in 1935. (Note: Built by Methodist missionary Harold Shepherdson on Elcho Island in the remote Arnham Land region of northern Australia. It was built from an imported kit and fitted with DH.60 Moth main wheels and a 34 hp two-cylinder Bristol Cherub. The Reverend Shepherdson completed a number of ground runs in his Parasol before severely damaging it by hitting a tree stump. Its remains are now in the collection of the Australian Aviation Heritage Centre in Darwin.)

General information
- Type: Home-built aircraft
- National origin: United States
- Manufacturer: Heath
- Designer: Edward Bayard Heath
- Primary user: Recreational flyers

History
- Introduction date: Parasol (1926); 1927 (Super Parasol); 1930 (V Parasol; 1931 (LN Parasol)
- First flight: 1926

The Heath Parasol is an American single or two seat, open-cockpit, parasol winged, homebuilt monoplane.

== Design and development ==
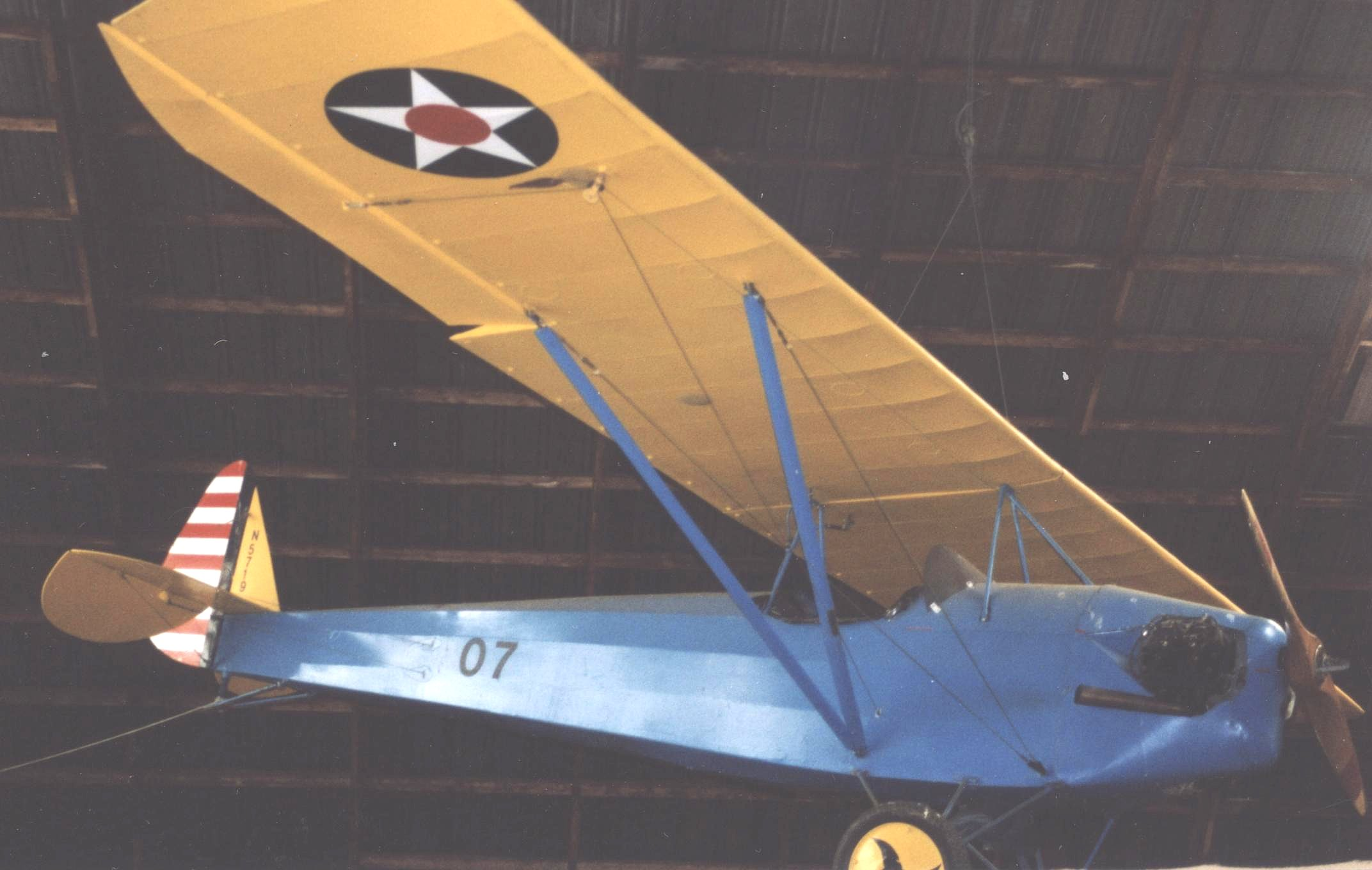
Heath Parasol LNA-40 of 1930 exhibited at Rhinebeck Aerodrome Museum, New York, in 2005

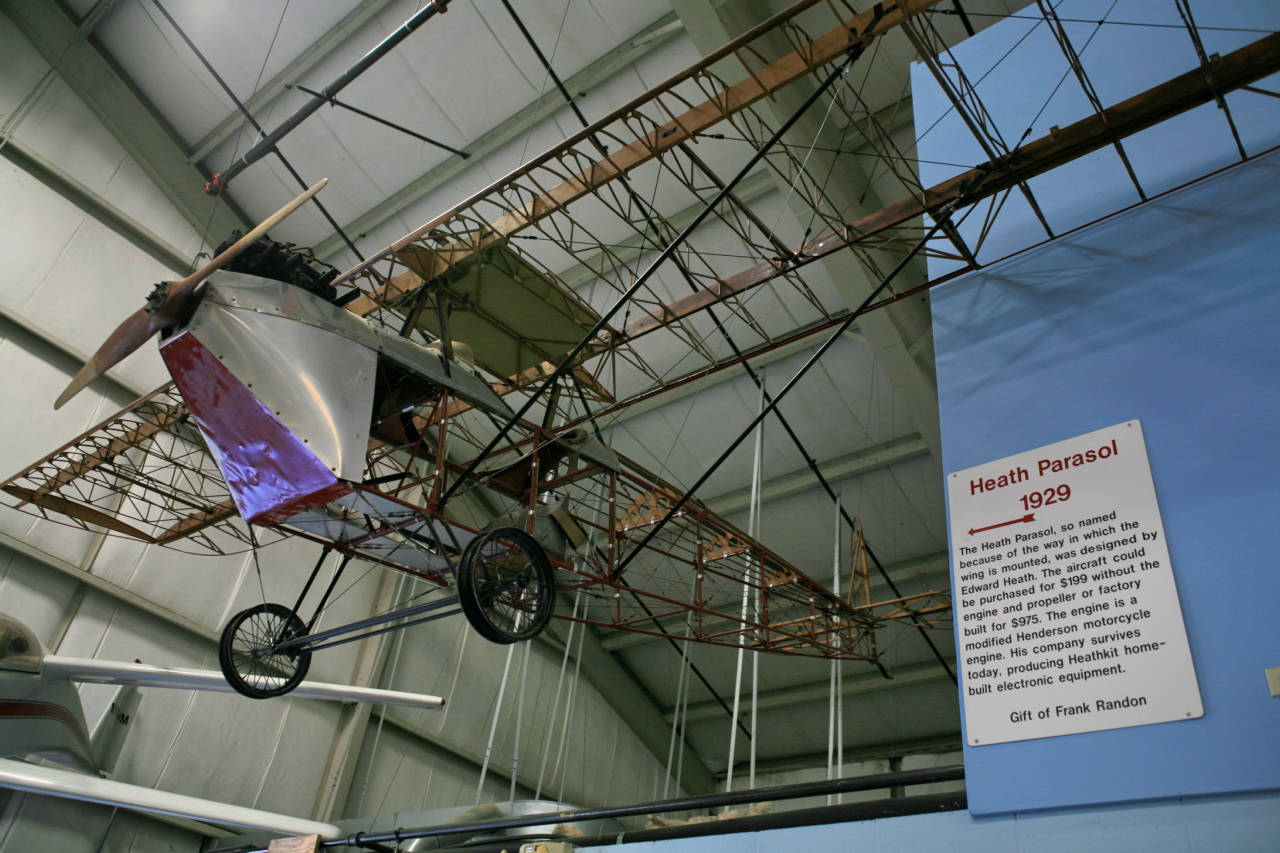
Heath LNB-4 Parasol (1929)

In 1926, Edward Bayard Heath, a successful American air racer and the owner of an aircraft parts supply business, built the first example of the Heath Parasol, a small, single seat parasol winged airplane using surplus wings from a Thomas-Morse S-4, a World War One fighter trainer, mounted above a steel-tube structure fuselage and powered by a Henderson four-cylinder motorcycle engine. This was the prototype for a series of single and two-seat recreational craft that utilized the Clark Y airfoil. In 1929 Modern Mechanix magazine published the plans in a series and the plans were reprinted in their "1929 Flying & Gliding Manual," which in turn has been reprinted periodically by the EAA (Experimental Aircraft Association).

Although Heath died in 1931, his Parasol designs remained extremely popular, being economical to build and operate as well as easy to fly. Subsequently, the Heath Company of St. Joseph / Benton Harbor Michigan sold nearly 1,000 kits on an installment basis. Fewer than 50 aircraft were factory built, but several hundred were completed and flown by homebuilders during the Great Depression. Heath is remembered today for having helped pioneer the homebuilt aircraft industry and for having introduced the kit concept of packaging the materials needed to build an aircraft.

When it ceased producing aircraft kits to concentrate on electronics (Heathkit), the Heath Company sold the ATC (CAA Aircraft Type Certificate) for the LNA-40 (ATC-487) to the EAA, who continued to sell original plans to potential homebuilders.

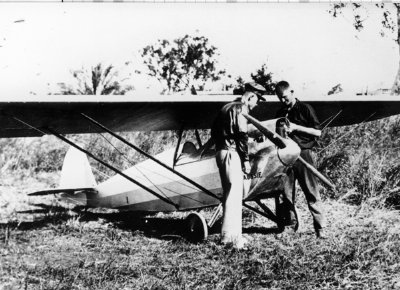
A modified Heath Parasol built and flown in 1934 by Bob Brown and Steve Nielson (right) at Home Hill in North Queensland.

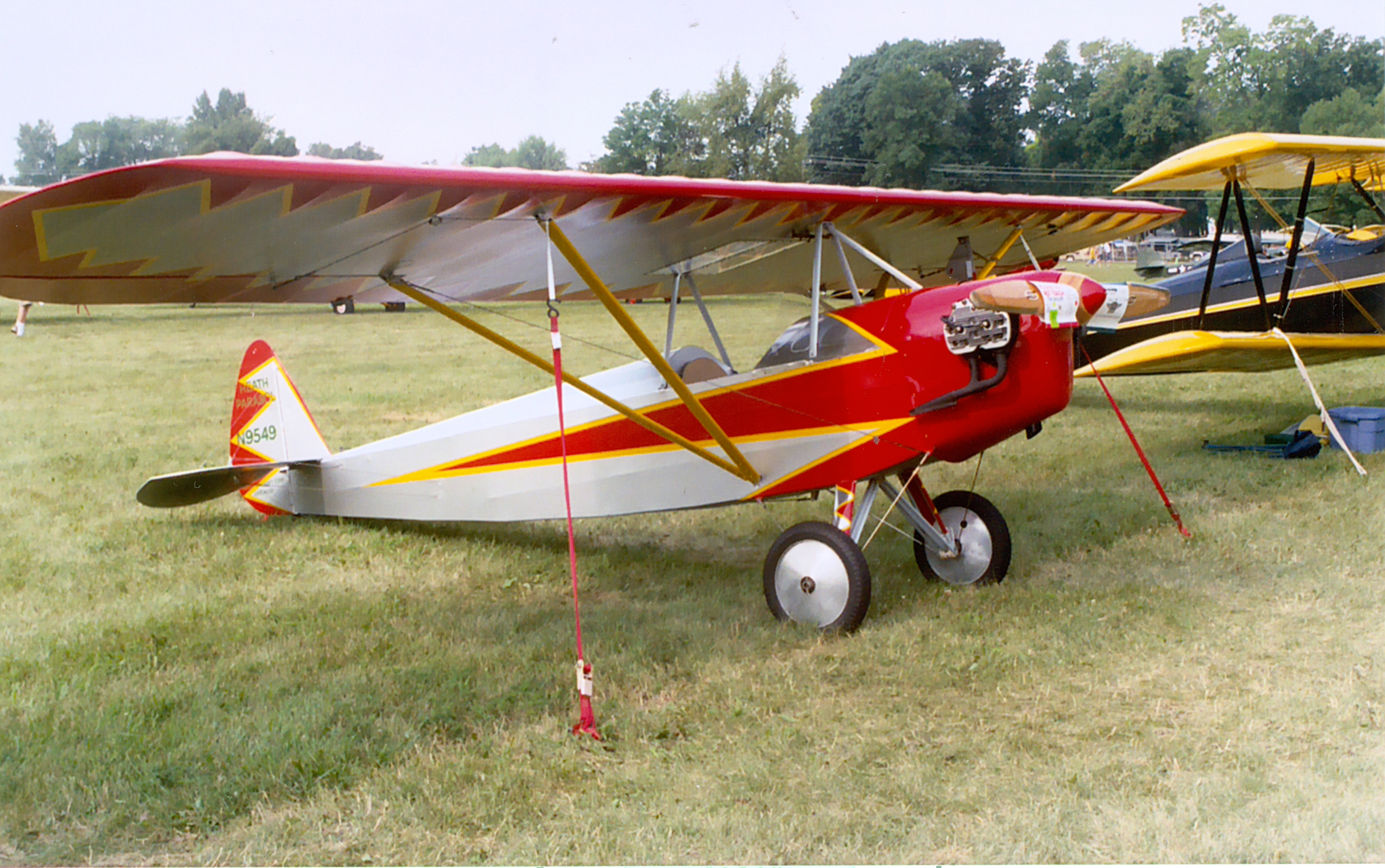
A Heath Parasol at Oshkosh 2003.

Except for the prototype, the wings consist of two solid spruce spars, built up wooden ribs, compression struts, and internal drag and anti-drag bracing. The Parasol's empennage is built of wood and is externally braced. Depending on the model, the fuselage was built of wood, bolted steel tube, or welded steel tube. The wing, empennage, and fuselage are fabric covered. Two five gallon fuel tanks are typically installed at the root end of each wing, the fuel being gravity fed, sometimes to a small collector tank behind the firewall. The only tools necessary to assemble one of the Parasol kits were a pair of small pliers, screwdriver, hacksaw (with plenty of blades), hammer, small hand drill, chisel, center punch, file and drill.

A variety of powerplants could be fitted, including the factory-supplied converted Henderson Motorcycle engine (viz. 25 hp (19 kW) Heath-Henderson B-4). Post-war, the VW boxer engine was used as well.

Production of an early version was undertaken as early as 1931, in Australia, by the Adcock-Heath Company.

== Variants ==
Home building encourages local variations that blur type definitions for non-certificated versions.

Prototype
Used the 24 ft 0 in (7.32 m), wing from a Thomas-Morse S-4C "Tommy."
CA-1 Parasol
Wingspan of 24 ft 0 in (7.32 m), with square tips. Parallel wing struts. First built 1928. Not Certificated (nor required to be). One seat. 260 pound empty weight. Heath B-4 engine, 27 hp at 2800 rpm.
CA-1A Super Parasol
Wingspan of 25 ft 0 in (7.62 m), with rounded tips. Parallel wing struts. First built 1929. Not Certificated (nor required to be). One seat. 260 pound empty weight. Heath B-4 engine, 27 hp at 2800 rpm.
1930 Super Parasol
Also known as the V-Parasol. Span 25 ft 0 in (7.62 m), various more powerful engines and V-form wing struts.
LNB-4 Parasol
Wing span increased to 31 ft 5 in (9.58 m). N-form struts. One or two seat. 450 pound empty weight. Heath B-4 engine, 25 hp at 2800 rpm. Certificated (CAA, ATC-456) June 3, 1932.
LNA-40 Parasol
Wingspan of 31 ft 5 in (9.58 m), V-form struts. One or two seats. 465 pound empty weight. Door moved to opposite side of fuselage to accommodate hand-propping the clockwise turning 37 hp (28 kW) (at 2550 rpm) Continental A40 powerplant. First built 1932. CAA type certificated (ATC-457) June 3, 1932.

== Surviving aircraft ==
- LNB-4 on static display at the New England Air Museum in Windsor Locks, Connecticut.
- An example is on static display at the Museum of Flight in Seattle, Washington.
- LNB-4 is on static display at the EAA Aviation Museum in Oshkosh, Wisconsin.
- LNA-40 is on static display at the Mid-Atlantic Air Museum in Reading, Pennsylvania.
- An example is on display at the Western North Carolina Air Museum in Hendersonville, North Carolina.
- LNA-40 is on static display at the Old Rhinebeck Aerodrome in Red Hook, New York.
- An example is in storage at the Golden Age Air Museum in Bethel, Pennsylvania.
- An example is on display at the Western Antique Aeroplane and Automobile Museum in Hood River, Oregon.
- LNB-4 on static display at the Tri-State Warbird Museum in Batavia, Ohio.
- An example is on display at the Shannon Air Museum in Fredericksburg, Virginia.
- An example is on display at the Moorabbin Air Museum in Melbourne, Victoria.
- An example is on display at the Eagles Mere Air Museum in Laporte, Pennsylvania.

== Specifications (Super Parasol) ==
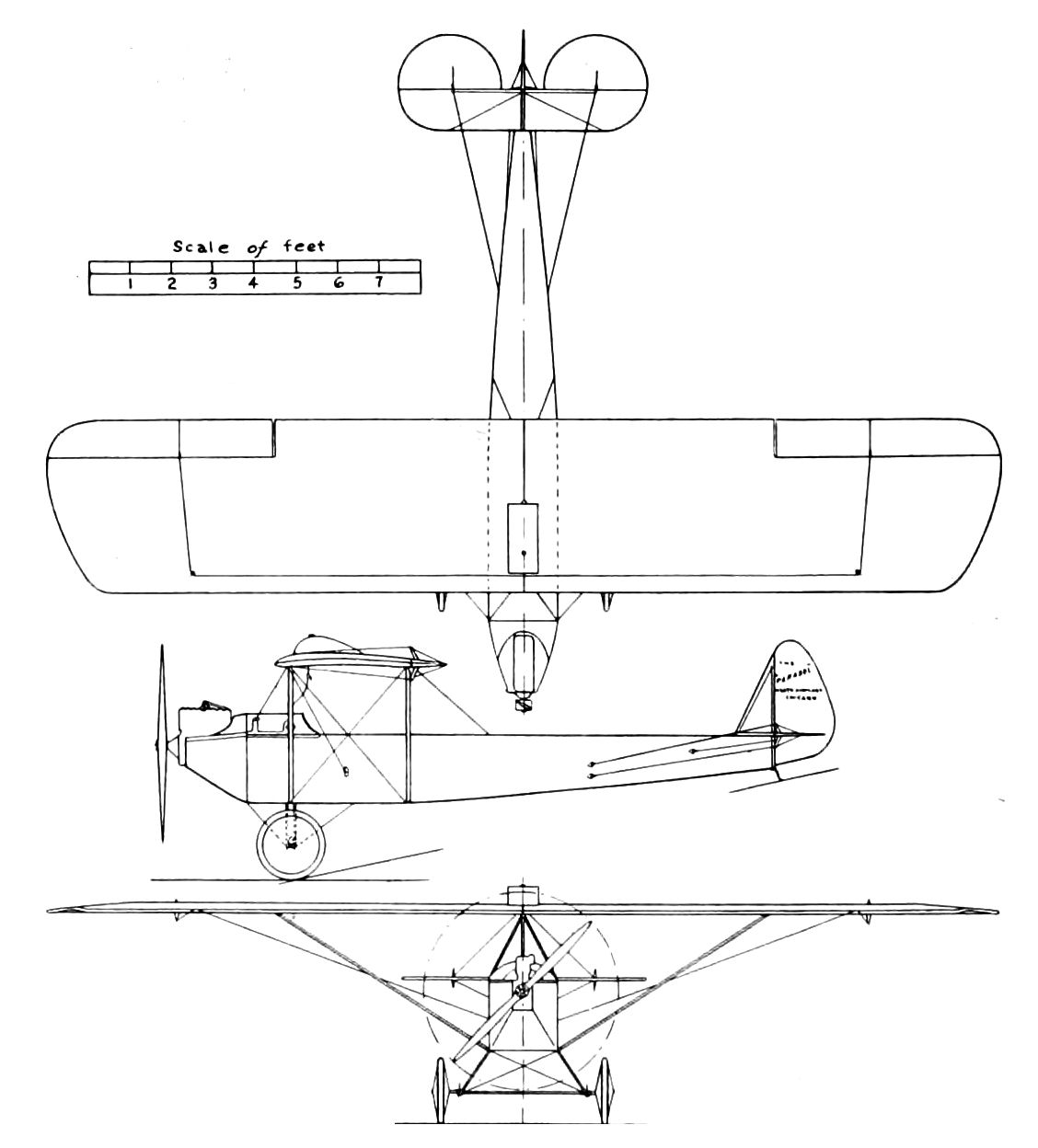
Heath Parasol 3-view drawing from Aero Digest March 1927

Data from Aviation

General characteristics

- Crew: 1
- Length: 17 ft 0 in (5.18 m)
- Wingspan: 25 ft 0 in (7.62 m)
- Height: 4 ft 6 in (1.37 m)
- Wing area: 110 sq ft (10 m^{2})
- Empty weight: 280 lb (127 kg)
- Gross weight: 580 lb (263 kg)
- Fuel capacity: 9 US gal (7.5 imp gal; 34 L)
- Powerplant: 1 × Heath , 27 hp (20 kW)

Performance

- Maximum speed: 70 mph (110 km/h, 61 kn)
- Cruise speed: 65 mph (105 km/h, 56 kn)
- Stall speed: 32 mph (51 km/h, 28 kn)
- Range: 270 mi (430 km, 230 nmi)
- Service ceiling: 12,500 ft (3,800 m)
- Rate of climb: 500 ft/min (2.5 m/s)

== See also ==
- Heathkit descendant company, maker of electronic kits

Aircraft of comparable role, configuration, and era

- Dormoy Bathtub
- Aerotique Parasol
- Fisher FP-505 Skeeter
- Loehle Sport Parasol
- Pietenpol Air Camper
- Pop's Props Cloudster
- Pop's Props Zing
- Powell P-70 Acey Deucy
- RagWing RW5 Heath Replica
