= Pazmany =

Pazmany might refer to:

- Péter Pázmány (1570–1637), Hungarian theologian and cardinal
- Ladislao Pazmany (1923–2006), aviation engineer
- Pazmany Aircraft Corporation, manufacturer of small aircraft
  - Pazmany PL-1
  - Pazmany PL-4
  - Pazmany PL-9 Stork

== See also ==
- Pázmány Péter Catholic University, private university in Budapest, Hungary
