= Little Wing (disambiguation) =

"Little Wing" is a 1967 song written by Jimi Hendrix and recorded by The Jimi Hendrix Experience.

Little Wing may also refer to:

- Little Wing (2016 film), a Finnish-Danish drama film directed by Selma Vilhunen
- Little Wing (2024 film), an American drama film directed by Dean Israelite
- Little Wings, an indie rock and folk band founded by Kyle Field
- Little Wing Kelly, the nickname of Bessie Bardot
- Little Wing Autogyros, Inc., an American aircraft manufacturer
  - Little Wing Autogyro, a series of conventional one and two place autogyros
  - Little Wing Roto-Pup, an American autogyro from the 1990s
- "Little Wing", a 1980 song by Neil Young from the album Hawks & Doves
- "Little Wing", a 2024 song by Sia from the album Reasonable Woman (album)
