= Rotec R3600 =

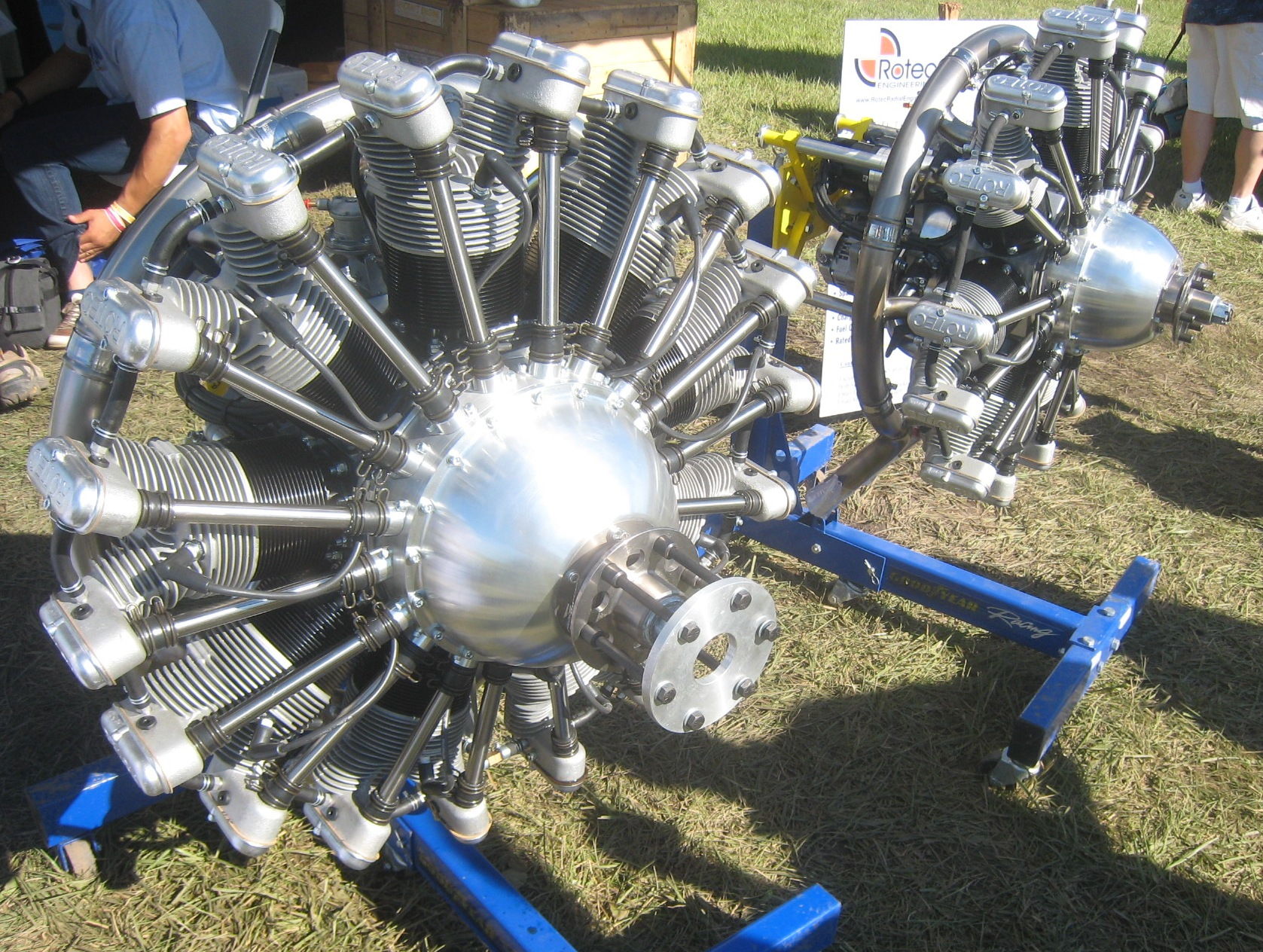
Rotec R3600 and R2800

The Rotec R3600 is a nine-cylinder radial engine built by Rotec Aerosport Pty Ltd in Australia. It was released in 2005 as a followup of the 7-cylinder Rotec R2800 that was debuted five years earlier. Both this engine and its smaller cousin have been frequently used as replacement engines for vintage World War 1 aircraft, and reproduction aircraft from the same vintage. This engine has been used in some notable aircraft such as the Fokker Triplane, Sopwith Camel and the Nieuport 17.

Note that these engines are not limited to only aircraft applications; JRL Cycles has converted an R3600 for use in a motorcycle.

== Applications ==
Applications include:

- Airdrome Sopwith Camel
- Avro 504K
- BJJR Bulldog
- Criquet Storch
- Dehavilland DHC-1
- Fokker DR1
- Hatz Classic
- Little Wing Autogyro
- Nieuport 24
- Nieuport 17
- Polikarpov I-16
- Samson Mite
- Sopwith Camel
- Van's RV-8R
- Warner Revolution II
- Zenith CH 200

== Specifications (Rotec R3600) ==
=== General characteristics ===
- Type: 9-cylinder Air-cooled single row radial engine
- Bore: 3.149 in (80 mm)
- Stroke: 3.149 in (80 mm)
- Displacement: 220.9 in³ (3,619 cc)
- Diameter: 33.47 in (850 mm)
- Dry weight: 275 lb (125 kg) (dry)

=== Components ===
- Valvetrain: Poppet Valve (pushrod activated), two per cylinder.
- Supercharger: None
- Turbocharger: None
- Fuel system: Carburetion
- Fuel type: 100LL Avgas
- Oil system: Dry Sump
- Cooling system: Air Cooled

=== Performance ===
- Power output: 150 hp (111.855 kW, 152 PS) at 3,600 RPM Geared
- Specific power: 0.68 hp/in³ (31.06 kW/L)
- Fuel consumption: 7.1 US Gal/hr (5.93 Imp Gal/hr, 27 Liters/hr) at 75% throttle
- Power-to-weight ratio: 0.54 hp/lb (0.89 kW/kg)

== See also ==
- List of motorcycles by type of engine
