= Criquet Storch =

Colombian light-sport aircraft

Storch

General information
- Type: Light-sport aircraft
- National origin: Colombia
- Manufacturer: Criquet Aviation
- Status: Production completed

The Criquet Storch (English: Stork) is a Colombian light-sport aircraft that was designed and produced by Criquet Aviation of Guaymaral Airport, Bogotá. The aircraft is a 75% scale replica of the German Second World War STOL liaison aircraft, the Fieseler Fi 156 Storch, with the company named for the French post-war production model of the same aircraft, the Morane-Saulnier MS.505 Criquet.

== Design and development ==
The aircraft was adapted from the original German plans to comply with the US light-sport aircraft rules. It features a strut-braced high-wing, a two-seats-in-tandem enclosed cockpit, fixed conventional landing gear and a single engine in tractor configuration.

The aircraft's 10.5 m (34.4 ft) span wing has an area of 16 m^{2} (170 sq ft) and is equipped with flaps and leading edge slots. Standard engines that were available include the 100 hp (75 kW) Rotax 912ULS, 115 hp (86 kW) turbocharged Rotax 914, 110 hp (82 kW) Rotec R2800, 150 hp (112 kW) Rotec R3600 radial engine and the 108 hp (81 kW) Lycoming O-235 four-stroke powerplants.

The design is an accepted Federal Aviation Administration Special Light-sport Aircraft.

== Specifications (version) ==
Data from Bayerl

General characteristics

- Crew: one
- Capacity: one passenger
- Wingspan: 10.5 m (34 ft 5 in)
- Wing area: 16 m^{2} (170 sq ft)
- Empty weight: 385 kg (849 lb)
- Gross weight: 625 kg (1,378 lb)
- Fuel capacity: 110 litres (24 imp gal; 29 US gal)
- Powerplant: 1 × Rotax 912ULS four cylinder, liquid and air-cooled, four stroke aircraft engine, 75 kW (101 hp)

Performance

- Cruise speed: 130 km/h (81 mph, 70 kn)
- Stall speed: 40 km/h (25 mph, 22 kn)
- Never exceed speed: 190 km/h (120 mph, 100 kn)

== See also ==
- Carlson Criquet
- Pazmany PL-9 Stork
- RagWing RW19 Stork
- Slepcev Storch
