= RagWing RW19 Stork =

Family of two-seat, single-engine homebuilt aircraft

General information
- Type: Homebuilt aircraft
- National origin: United States
- Manufacturer: Ragwing Aircraft Designs
- Designer: Roger Mann
- Status: Plans no longer available
- Number built: 9 (December 2007)

History
- Introduction date: 1998
- First flight: August 1997

The RagWing RW19 Stork is a family of two-seat, high wing, strut-braced, conventional landing gear, single-engine homebuilt aircraft designed by Roger Mann and sold as plans by RagWing Aircraft Designs for amateur construction.

The RW19 is a 75% scale replica of the Fieseler Storch Second World War German liaison aircraft. The RW19 is noted for its STOL performance, equal to or better than that of the original Storch. The claimed take-off run and landing roll are 30 ft (9 m) due to a 15 mph (24 km/h) stall speed.

== Design and development ==
The RW19 was designed for the US experimental homebuilt aircraft category and was first flown in August 1997. It also qualifies as an Experimental Light-sport aircraft in the USA.

The airframe is constructed from wood and tube and covered with aircraft fabric. The landing gear is of conventional configuration. The aircraft's installed power range is 70 to 80 hp (52 to 60 kW) and the standard engine is the 70 hp (52 kW) 2si 690, although the 80 hp (60 kW) Rotax 912UL engine has also been used.

The RW19 was originally available as a complete kit, less only the engine, but today is only offered as plans. The designer estimates it will take 600 hours to complete the aircraft, although other estimates run from 300 to 1500 hours.

== Variants ==
RW19 Stork
Tandem seat version
RW20 Stork Side by Side
Side-by-side seating version, performance the same as the tandem seat version

== Specifications (RW19) ==
Data from Kitplanes, Purdy and RagWing

General characteristics

- Crew: one
- Capacity: one passenger
- Length: 22 ft 0 in (6.71 m)
- Wingspan: 32 ft 0 in (9.75 m)
- Height: 7 ft 0 in (2.13 m)
- Wing area: 180 sq ft (17 m^{2})
- Empty weight: 497 lb (225 kg)
- Gross weight: 1,200 lb (544 kg)
- Fuel capacity: 20 US gallons (76 litres)
- Powerplant: 1 × 2si 690 twin cylinder two stroke aircraft engine, 70 hp (52 kW)
- Propellers: 2-bladed wooden

Performance

- Cruise speed: 75 mph (121 km/h, 65 kn)
- Stall speed: 15 mph (24 km/h, 13 kn)
- Never exceed speed: 105 mph (169 km/h, 91 kn)
- Minimum control speed: 15 mph (24 km/h, 13 kn)
- Range: 250 mi (400 km, 220 nmi)
- Service ceiling: 15,000 ft (4,600 m)
- Rate of climb: 1,200 ft/min (6.1 m/s)

== See also ==
Aircraft of comparable role, configuration, and era

- Carlson Criquet
- Criquet Storch
- Pazmany PL-9 Stork
- Slepcev Storch
