= Airdrome Sopwith Camel =

American fighter replica

General information
- Type: Amateur-built aircraft
- National origin: United States
- Manufacturer: Airdrome Aeroplanes
- Status: In production (2011)
- Number built: 1 (2011)

History
- Developed from: Sopwith Camel

The Airdrome Sopwith Camel is an American amateur-built aircraft, designed and produced by Airdrome Aeroplanes, of Holden, Missouri. The aircraft is supplied as a kit for amateur construction.

The aircraft is a full-scale replica of the First World War British Sopwith Camel fighter. The replica is built from modern materials and powered by modern engines.

== Design and development ==
The Airdrome Sopwith Camel features a strut-braced biplane layout, a single-seat open cockpit, fixed conventional landing gear and a single engine in tractor configuration.

The aircraft fuselage is made from welded 4130 steel tubing, covered in doped aircraft fabric. The Airdrome Sopwith Camel has a wingspan of 26.2 ft (8.0 m) and a wing area of 195 sq ft (18.1 m^{2}). The standard engine used is the 150 hp (112 kW) four stroke Rotec R3600 radial engine. Building time from the factory-supplied kit is estimated at 450 hours by the manufacturer.

== Operational history ==
One example had been completed by December 2011.

== Specifications (Sopwith Camel) ==
Data from Kitplanes

General characteristics

- Crew: one
- Wingspan: 26.2 ft (8.0 m)
- Wing area: 195 sq ft (18.1 m^{2})
- Empty weight: 943 lb (428 kg)
- Gross weight: 1,243 lb (564 kg)
- Fuel capacity: 18 U.S. gallons (68 L; 15 imp gal)
- Powerplant: 1 × Rotec R3600 nine cylinder, air-cooled, four stroke radial engine, 150 hp (110 kW)
- Propellers: 2-bladed wooden

Performance

- Cruise speed: 85 mph (137 km/h, 74 kn)
- Stall speed: 40 mph (64 km/h, 35 kn)
- Range: 200 mi (320 km, 170 nmi)
- Rate of climb: 675 ft/min (3.43 m/s)
- Wing loading: 6.4 lb/sq ft (31 kg/m^{2})
