= Pazmany Aircraft Corporation =

- Formerly: L. Pazmany & Associates
- Industry: Aerospace
- Founder: Ladislao Pazmany
- Headquarters: San Diego, California, United States

The Pazmany Aircraft Corporation is an American aircraft design and manufacturing company. The company provides plans for the PL-2, PL-4 and PL-9 for the homebuilder market.

== History ==
The company was founded as L. Pazmany & Associates at San Diego, California to produce the PL-1 single-seat light aircraft designed by Ladislao Pazmany. The PL-1 was followed by the two-seat PL-2. The PL-4 is a single-seat trainer. The latest aircraft is Pazmany PL-9 Stork a high-wing two-seat monoplane for the home builder market, it is a 3/4 scale homebuilders version of the Second World War Fiesler Storch.

== Aircraft ==
Model name	First flight	Number built	Type
Pazmany PL-1	1962		Single engine monoplane trainer
Pazmany PL-2	1969		Single engine monoplane trainer
Pazmany PL-4	1972	50+	Single engine monoplane homebuilt
Pazmany PL-9 Stork			Single engine monoplane homebuilt
