= Carlson Criquet =

American homebuilt aircraft

General information
- Type: Homebuilt aircraft
- National origin: United States
- Manufacturer: Carlson Aircraft
- Designer: Ernst W. Carlson
- Status: Out of production
- Number built: 1

History
- Introduction date: 1999
- Developed from: Fieseler Fi 156

The Carlson Criquet is an American, two-seats-in-tandem, high wing, strut-braced, single engine, homebuilt aircraft that was designed by Ernst W. Carlson and produced by Carlson Aircraft of East Palestine, Ohio in kit form. The prototype was completed in 1999.

The Criquet is a 3/4 scale replica of the German Second World War liaison aircraft, the Fieseler Fi 156 Storch (English: Stork) and is named for the French post-war production model of the same aircraft, the Morane-Saulnier MS.505 Criquet.

== Design and development ==
The Criquet has a 4130 steel tube frame fuselage, with the fuselage and wing all covered in doped fabric. The wings are supported by V-struts with jury struts. The landing gear is fixed and of conventional configuration. The Criquet was available as a kit that included a pre-welded fuselage. The aircraft's power range is 130 to 160 hp (97 to 119 kW) and the original standard engine specified was the 140 hp (104 kW) Walter Lom Avia M332.

With a stall speed of 16 mph (26 km/h) the Criquet is capable of operation from small, unprepared fields and has a reported take-off and landing distance of 50 ft (15 m).

Construction time from the kit is reported to be 1000 hours. Only one prototype, N22CA, was completed and it was destroyed in an accident on 24 May 2000 at East Palestine, Ohio, USA, with one fatality. The kit was no longer offered after 2005.

== Specifications (Criquet) ==
Data from Kitplanes

General characteristics

- Crew: one
- Capacity: one passenger
- Length: 24 ft 7 in (7.49 m)
- Wingspan: 36 ft 7 in (11.15 m)
- Height: 7 ft 6 in (2.29 m)
- Wing area: 197 sq ft (18.3 m^{2})
- Empty weight: 1,050 lb (476 kg)
- Gross weight: 1,950 lb (885 kg)
- Fuel capacity: 42 US gallons (159 litres)
- Powerplant: 1 × Avia M332 , 140 hp (100 kW)
- Propellers: 2-bladed fixed pitch

Performance

- Maximum speed: 135 mph (217 km/h, 117 kn)
- Cruise speed: 95 mph (153 km/h, 83 kn)
- Stall speed: 16 mph (26 km/h, 14 kn)
- Range: 150 mi (240 km, 130 nmi)
- Service ceiling: 13,000 ft (4,000 m)
- Rate of climb: 800 ft/min (4.1 m/s)
- Wing loading: 9.9 lb/sq ft (48 kg/m^{2})

== See also ==
Related development

- Fieseler Fi 156

Aircraft of comparable role, configuration, and era

- Criquet Storch
- Pazmany PL-9 Stork
- RagWing RW19 Stork
- Slepcev Storch
