= Pazmany PL-1 =

1962 sportplane family by Pazmany

PL-1 Laminar/Cheinshou and PL-2
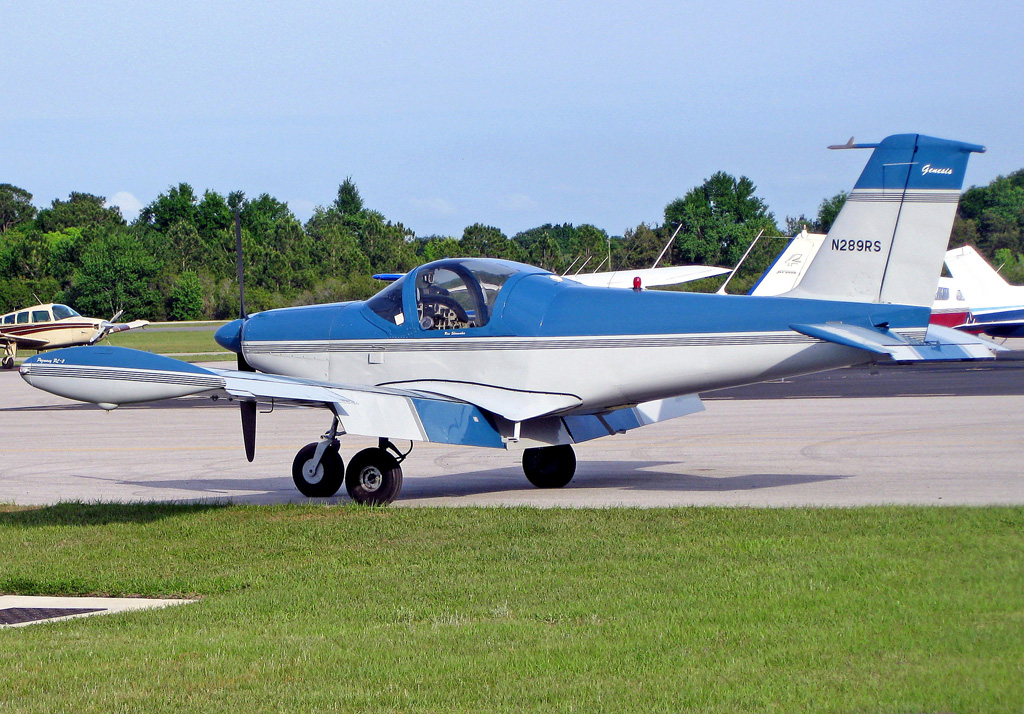
- Pazmany PL-2 at Winter Haven Airport, Florida, in 2011

General information
- Type: Two-seat trainer
- Manufacturer: Pazmany Aircraft Corporation
- Designer: Ladislao Pazmany
- Primary user: Republic of China Air Force

History
- First flight: 23 March 1962

The Pazmany PL-1 Laminar and Pazmany PL-2 are American two-seat trainer and personal light aircraft designed by Ladislao Pazmany to be marketed as a homebuilt aircraft by his company Pazmany Aircraft Corporation. The aircraft was built under license in Taiwan (Republic of China) as the AIDC PL-1B Cheinshou. It was later followed by an improved version the PL-2. The SLAF Aircraft Engineering Wing developed a modified variant of the PL-2 in 1977, which was never used operationally.

== Development ==
The PL-1 Laminar was the first design by Ladislao Pazmany, it was intended to be marketed for the homebuilt market. The prototype first flew on the 23 March 1962. The PL-1 is a cantilever low-wing monoplane with a fixed tricycle landing gear. It has side-by-side seating for a crew of two and is powered by a 95 hp (71 kW) Continental C-90 piston engine. The Aerospace Industrial Development Corporation (AIDC) acquired plans and built a PL-1 for evaluation with a first flight on 26 October 1968. AIDC then built 58 aircraft designated the PL-1B for the Republic of China Air Force and fitted with a 150 hp (112 kW) Avco Lycoming O-320 engine.

Soon after the first flight Pazmany produced an improved design, the PL-2 which had a slight increase in cockpit width and changes to the structure to make it easier for homebuilders. The PL-2 was evaluated by a number of air forces in South East Asia. It was built under license in Indonesia as the LIPNUR LT-200.

== Variants ==
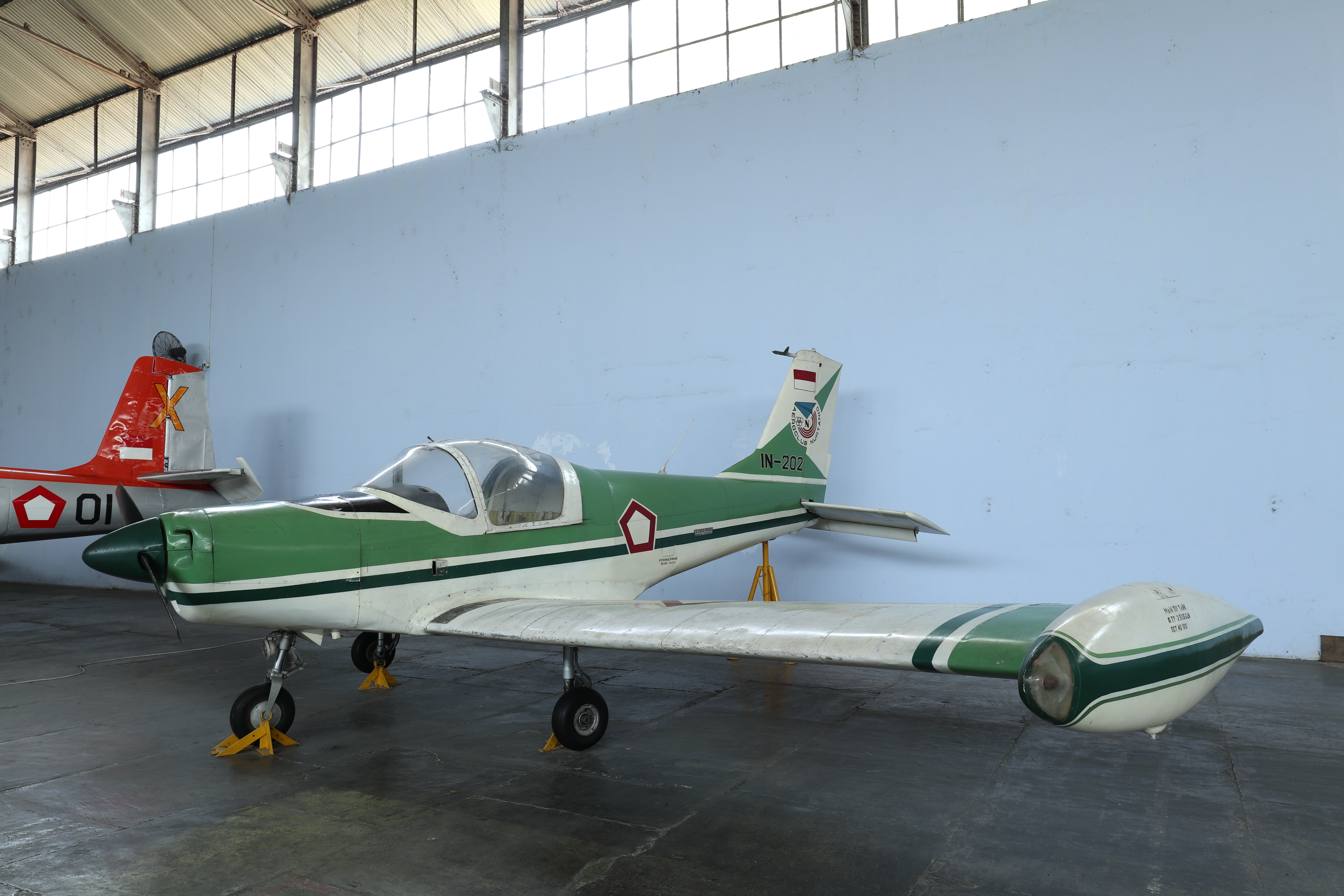
LIPNUR LT-200 on display at Dirgantara Mandala Museum, Yogyakarta

PL-1
Original design for home-built light aircraft
PL-1B
License-built variant by AIDC with a 150hp (112kW) Avco Lycoming O-320 engine, 58 built. Known as the PL-1B Chieh Shou.
PL-2
More rounded, wider cockpit, increased wing dihedral.
PL-2A
Improved model, all metal, two seats
LT-200
License-built PL-2 variant by LIPNUR in Indonesia, 4 were built.
Saemaeho
A licensed-produced version from South Korea.

== Operators ==
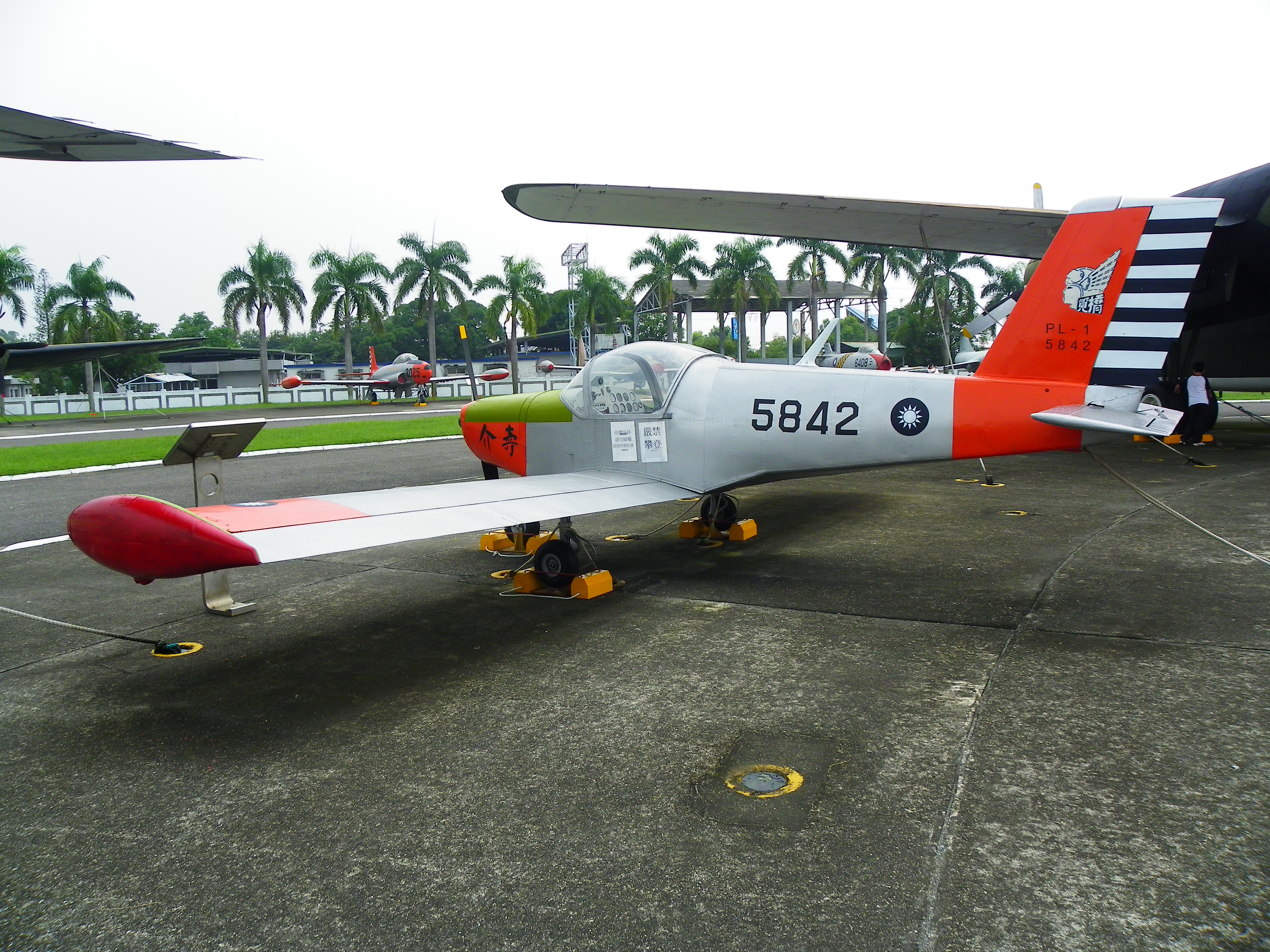
Republic of China Air Force PL-1B primary trainer

Indonesia

- Indonesian Air Force - LT-200 (Licensed-built PL-2)
- Politeknik Penerbangan Indonesia Curug - LT-200 (Licensed-built PL-2)

South Korea

- Republic of Korea Air Force - Saemaeho

South Vietnam

- Republic of Vietnam Air Force - One aircraft, no longer in service. Named Tien Phong "Pioneer" and built under U.S supervision. Plans for additional aircraft were cancelled in 1972

Sri Lanka

- Sri Lanka Air Force - Sri Lankan built PL-2 variants were in operation until the early 1980s.

Taiwan (Republic of China)

- Republic of China Air Force - PL-1, PL-1A, PL-1B
- Republic of China Army - PL-1B

Thailand

- Thai Air Force - Two PL-2 were assembled in 1974 by Thai Air Force. Possibly they were evaluated for production, but no further aircraft were built. One of them is now on display at the RTAF Museum.

== Specifications (LT-200) ==
Data from The Illustrated Encyclopedia of Aircraft (Part Work 1982-1985), 1985, Orbis Publishing, Page 2694

General characteristics

- Crew: 2
- Length: 19 ft 3.5 in (5.88 m)
- Wingspan: 28 ft 0 in (8.53 m)
- Height: 7 ft 7 in (2.31 m)
- Wing area: 116.0 sq ft (10.78 m^{2})
- Empty weight: 904 lb (410 kg)
- Gross weight: 1,609 lb (730 kg)
- Powerplant: 1 × Avco Lycoming O-320-E2A flat-four piston , 150 hp (112 kW)

Performance

- Maximum speed: 152 mph (245 km/h, 132 kn)
- Endurance: 5 hours 30 minutes
- Service ceiling: 14,995 ft (4,570 m)
