= Ryson ST-100 Cloudster =

Two-seat motor glider

ST-100 Cloudster
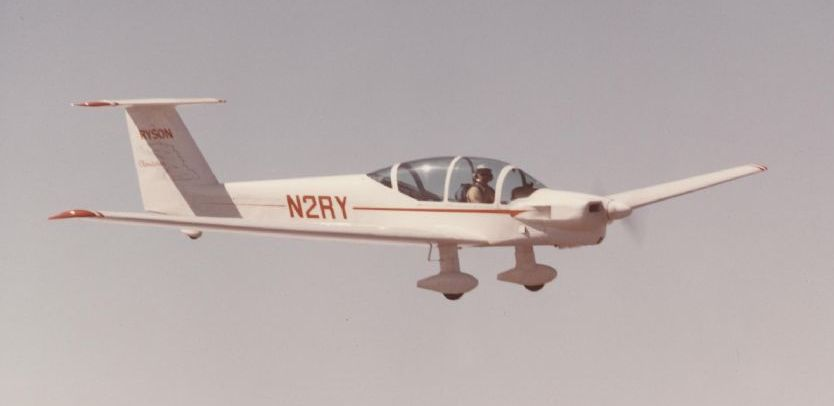

General information
- Type: Motor glider
- National origin: United States
- Manufacturer: Ryson Aviation
- Designer: Tubal Claude Ryan, Ladislao Pazmany
- Status: No longer in production
- Number built: 1

History
- Introduction date: 1983
- First flight: 1976

The Ryson ST-100 Cloudster is a tandem two-seat, low-wing, conventional landing gear motor glider that was designed by T. Claude Ryan first flown in 1976 and certified in 1983. The aircraft was intended to be used as both a motor glider and a light aircraft and was type certified in both categories.

== Design and development ==
T. Claude Ryan had a long and illustrious career as an aerospace engineer, starting many storied companies, including Ryan Aeronautical Corporation and the Ryan Aeronautical Company. Late in his career, in 1969 he sold Ryan Aeronautical to Teledyne and it became Teledyne-Ryan, with Ryan remaining as chairman emeritus. He started yet another company Ryson Aviation with his son, Jerome Ryan and designed a new aircraft designated the ST-100 and named the Cloudster in honour of the Douglas Cloudster that he had purchased in 1925 and renamed the Ryan Cloudster at that time. Ladislao Pazmany is credited with contributions to the aircraft's design, as well.

The ST-100 was intended to be first and foremost a motor glider and second a light aircraft to be flown cross country under power. The aircraft is made with all-metal construction and features a 57.7 ft (17.6 m) wingspan. The wing has flaps with a range of -12 to +60° and a flap-aileron interconnect. The landing gear is conventional and features wheel pants. Power is supplied by a 100 hp (75 kW) Continental O-200-A mounted in tractor configuration. The ST-100 has two batteries to ensure that the engine can be restarted in flight.

The prototype, registered N2RY, serial number 001, was completed in 1976. The type was certified on 29 July 1983 under separate type certificates for both FAR Part 23 and Part 26 as a light aircraft and also as a powered glider, for day visual flight rules flight only. The aircraft is also certified for aerobatics. Production was planned, but the elder Ryan died on 11 September 1982 at age 84 and no aircraft beyond the one prototype were produced. In March 2011 the prototype ST-100 was still owned by Ryson Aviation of San Diego.

== Specifications (ST-100) ==
Data from Soaring and FAA Type Certificate Data Sheets

General characteristics

- Crew: one
- Capacity: one passenger
- Wingspan: 57 ft 8 in (17.58 m)
- Wing area: 213 sq ft (19.8 m^{2})
- Aspect ratio: 15.6
- Airfoil: Wortmann FX 67-170/17
- Empty weight: 1,212 lb (550 kg)
- Gross weight: 1,750 lb (794 kg)
- Fuel capacity: 32 U.S. gallons (120 L; 27 imp gal)
- Powerplant: 1 × Continental O-200-A , 100 hp (75 kW)
- Propellers: 2-bladed Hoffmann HO-V62-R/107Y variable pitch, fully feathering

Performance

- Never exceed speed: 178 mph (286 km/h, 155 kn)
- Range: 610 mi (980 km, 530 nmi)
- Service ceiling: 18,000 ft (5,500 m)
- Maximum glide ratio: 28:1
- Rate of sink: 180 ft/min (0.91 m/s)
- Wing loading: 7.75 lb/sq ft (37.8 kg/m^{2})

== See also ==
- List of gliders
