= BJJR Bulldog =

British autogyro

Bulldog

General information
- Type: Autogyro
- National origin: United Kingdom
- Manufacturer: BJJR
- Status: Under development (2015)

History
- Introduction date: 2015

The BJJR Bulldog is a British autogyro under development by BJJR of Derby and publicly introduced at the AERO Friedrichshafen airshow in 2015. The company was founded in 2014 by Barry Jones and James Robb. The aircraft is intended to be supplied complete and ready-to-fly.

== Design and development ==
The Bulldog features a single main rotor, a two-seats-in tandem open cockpit with two windshields, conventional landing gear and a nine-cylinder, air-cooled, four-stroke, dual-ignition 150 hp (112 kW) Rotec R3600 radial engine in tractor configuration. The aircraft fuselage is made from composite materials.

Styled as a 1930s aircraft, the design employs an unusual curved main rotor mast that also serves as a vertical stabilizer.

== Specifications (Bulldog) ==
Data from Tacke

General characteristics

- Crew: one
- Capacity: one passenger
- Gross weight: 600 kg (1,323 lb)
- Powerplant: 1 × Rotec R3600 nine cylinder, air-cooled, four-stroke, dual-ignition radial engine, 110 kW (150 hp)
- Propellers: 2-bladed wooden, fixed pitch

== See also ==
- List of rotorcraft
