= Little Wing Autogyros, Inc. =

American autogyro manufacturer

- Company type: Privately held company
- Industry: Aerospace
- Founder: Ron Herron
- Headquarters: Mayflower, Arkansas, United States
- Products: Kit aircraft
- Owner: Ron Herron and Kristine Irvin
- Website: www.littlewingautogyro.com

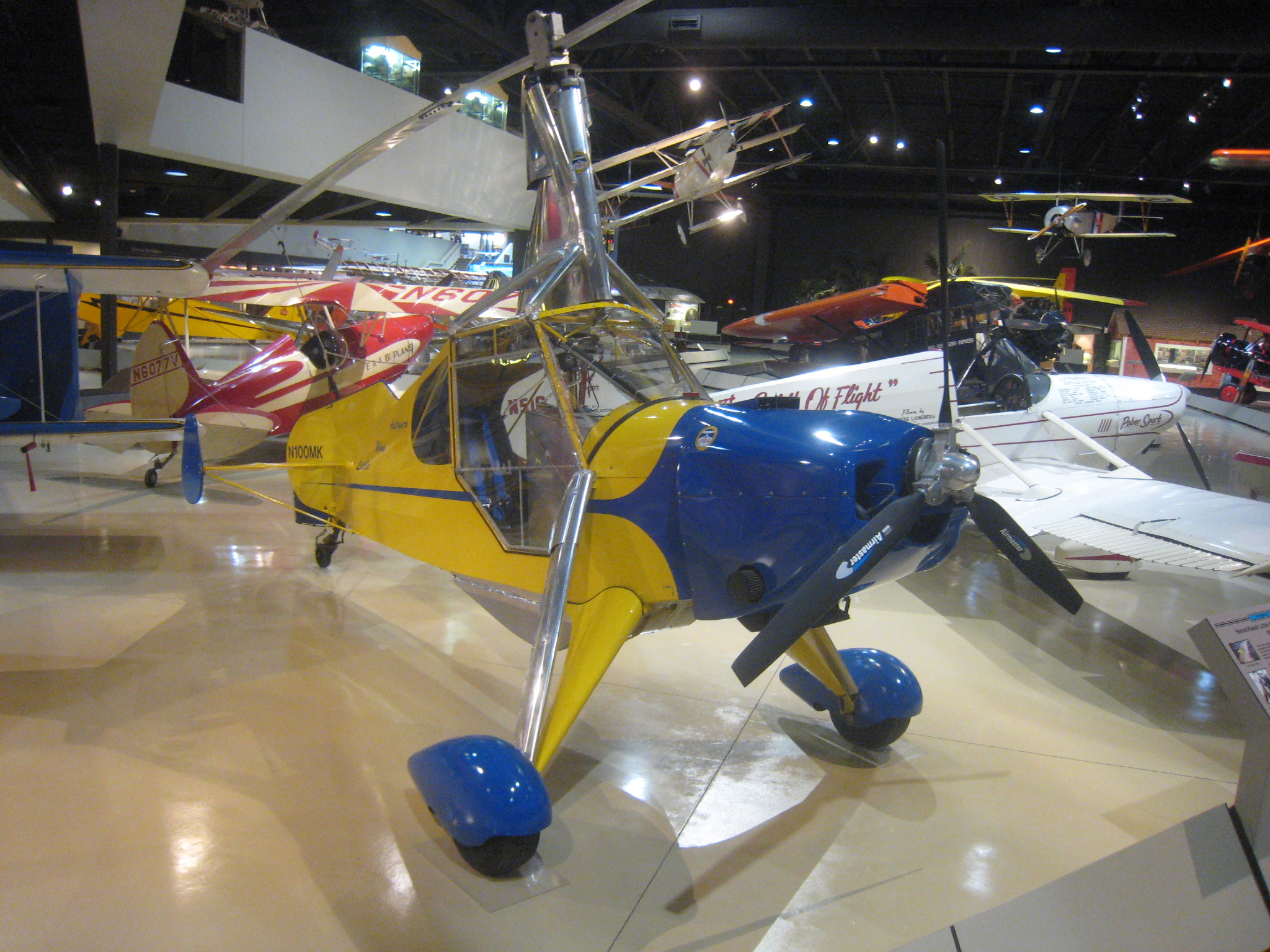
Little Wing LW-5 in the EAA AirVenture Museum in Oshkosh, Wisconsin

Little Wing Autogyros, Inc. is an American aircraft manufacturer based in Mayflower, Arkansas and founded by Ron Herron. The company specializes in the design and manufacture of autogyros in the form of plans and kits for amateur construction including for the US FAR 103 Ultralight Vehicles rules.

The company is jointly owned by Ron Herron and his fiancée, Kristine Irvin. Herron is an instructor of aviation maintenance instructor at Pulaski Technical College, North Little Rock, Arkansas and also formerly ran an aviation maintenance facility, Little Wing Aviation.

Herron set out to design a safer autogyro, after experiences flying the Bensen B-8M in the mid-1970s. The company's designs use an unusual control system, common to all the Little Wing Autogyros, that was designed by David Kay in the early 1930s. It uses a mast that is fixed fore-and-aft, but which pivots laterally for banking the aircraft. Longitudinal control is achieved by an elevator and horizontal stabilizer system, designed to eliminate power-induced bunt "push-over" accidents.

The company has produced a whole line of single and two-seat autogyros, based on light aircraft fuselages, from the Little Wing LW-1 to the Little Wing LW-5. The Little Wing Roto-Pup is based on the Preceptor Ultra Pup airframe and optimized for the US FAR 103 Ultralight Vehicles rules.

A Little Wing LW-5 is preserved in the EAA AirVenture Museum in Oshkosh, Wisconsin.

== Aircraft ==
Summary of aircraft built by Little Wing Autogyros
Model name	First flight	Number built	Type
Little Wing LW-1	1995		Single-seat autogyro
Little Wing LW-2			Single-seat autogyro
Little Wing LW-3		8 (2005)	Single-seat autogyro
Little Wing LW-4		3 (2005)	Two-seat autogyro
Little Wing LW-5			Two-seat autogyro
Little Wing Roto-Pup		3 (1998)	Single-seat US FAR 103 ultralight category autogyro
