= Fieseler Fi 156 Storch =

German liaison aircraft

Fi 156 Storch
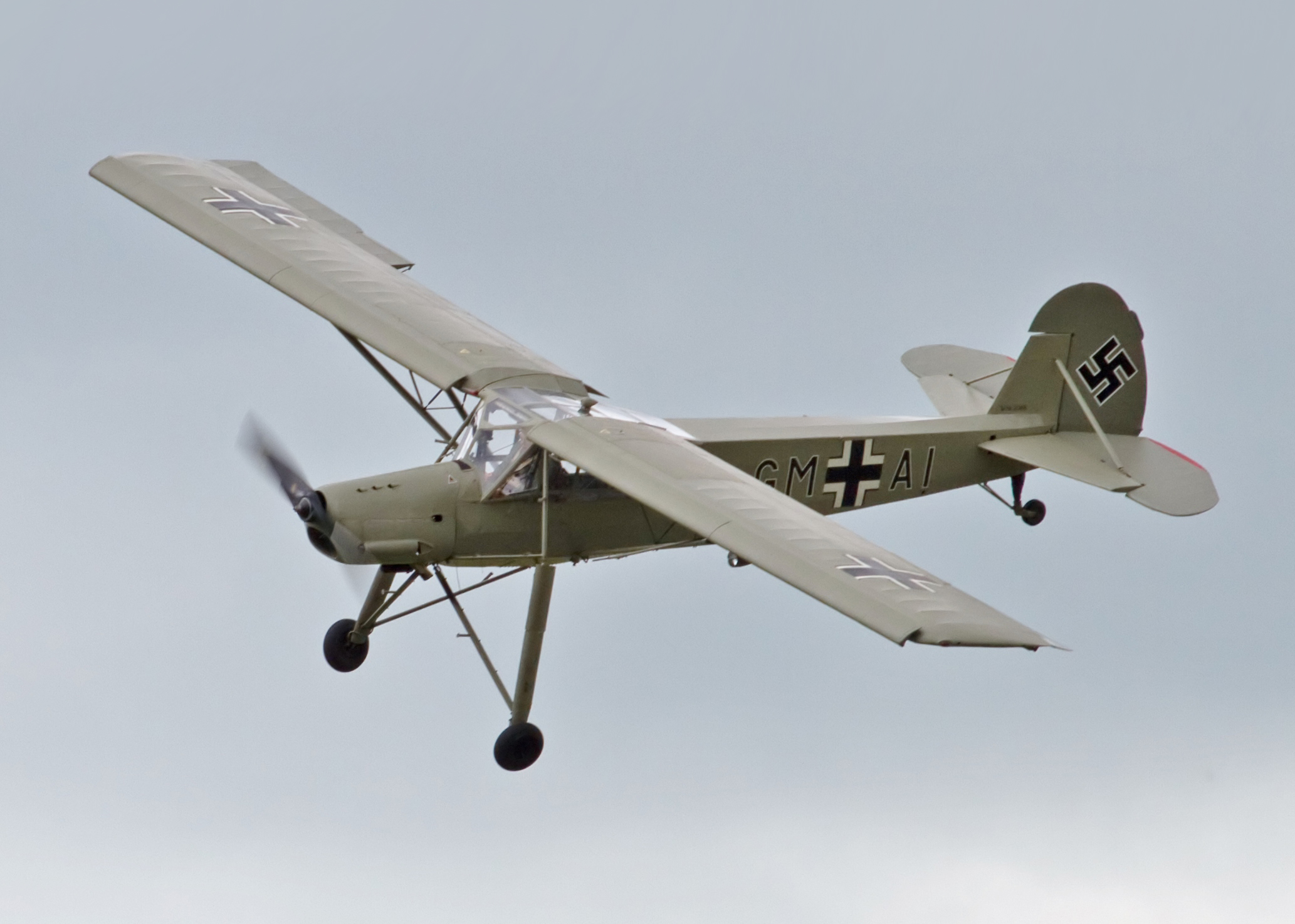
- Storch in flight at Flying Legends (July 2012)

General information
- Type: Reconnaissance & communications
- National origin: Nazi Germany
- Manufacturer: Fieseler; Morane-Saulnier
- Primary users: Luftwaffe French Army; French Air Force
- Number built: Over 2,900

History
- Manufactured: 1937–1949 (-1965 as the MS 500)
- Introduction date: 1937
- First flight: 24 May 1936
- Retired: Germany: 1945; France: 1970

The Fieseler Fi 156 Storch ([ʃtɔrç], "stork") is a liaison aircraft designed and produced by the German aircraft manufacturer Fieseler. Its nickname of Storch was derived from the lengthy legs of its main landing gear, which gave the aircraft a similar appearance to that of the long-legged, big-winged bird.

Developed during the mid 1930s in response to a request from the Reichsluftfahrtministerium (Reich Aviation Ministry or RLM), the Fi 156 was an affordable and easy to construct aircraft purpose designed for the liaison, army co-operation, and medical evacuation roles. On 24 May 1936, the Fi 156 V1 performed its maiden flight; the first deliveries took place less than a year later. It was well regarded for its excellent short field (STOL) performance and low stalling speed of 50 km/h (31 mph). Around 2,900 aircraft of various models, the most commonplace being the Fi 156C, were produced between 1937 and 1945. The Fi 156 quickly became popular on the export market, eventually being widely used by various nations.

Numerous countries deployed their aircraft in a military capacity across various theatres of the Second World War. The Fi 156 was extensively operated by the Luftwaffe, who often used it in the aerial reconnaissance role and less often as a troop transport. German aircraft saw action on the Eastern Front, Western Front, the Western Desert, and even the Arctic. During September 1943, the Storch played a pivotal role in Operation Eiche, the rescue of deposed Italian dictator Benito Mussolini from a boulder-strewn mountain-top near the Gran Sasso. On 26 April 1945, a Storch was one of the last aircraft to land on the improvised airstrip in the Tiergarten near the Brandenburg Gate during the Battle of Berlin. During the conflict, several Störche were captured by the Allies; several were used as the personal aircraft of high ranking officers such as Field Marshal Bernard Montgomery, Air Vice Marshal Arthur Coningham, and Air Vice Marshal Harry Broadhurst.

Even after the end of the conflict, production of the type continued in other countries into the 1950s, both for the private market and military operators. In addition to Germany, additional production lines had been established in France, Czechoslovakia, Romania, and the Soviet Union. Furthermore, there have been many attempts to recreate or imitate the Fi 156, including several three-quarter scale homebuilt aircraft, such as the Pazmany PL-9 Stork, RagWing RW19 Stork, and STOL King. The Slepcev Storch and French-built later variants of the original aircraft have often appeared at air shows and other flying events. Numerous flight-worthy aircraft are still operational into the twenty-first century.

== Development ==
=== Background and selection ===
During 1935, the Reichsluftfahrtministerium (Reich Aviation Ministry or RLM) issued in invitation to several aviation companies to submit their proposals for a new aircraft for the Luftwaffe that was to be suitable for the roles of liaison, army co-operation (today called forward air control), and medical evacuation. The German aircraft manufacturer Fieseler quickly took an interest in the new requirement and opted to produce its own clean sheet design, which was largely conceived of by chief designer Reinhold Mewes and technical director Erich Bachem. This new aircraft, which was subsequently assigned the Fi 156 designation, was specifically designed to achieve particularly strong short take off and landing ("STOL") performance.

In addition to Fieseler's submission, competing proposals were submitted from various other aircraft manufacturers, including Weser Flugzeugbau and Siebel in the form of the Bf 163 and Si 201 respectively. While the Bf 163 broadly resembled the Fi 156, the Si 201 was a relatively unorthodox aircraft; all three designs were evaluated in depth by officials. The Fi 156 emerged as the favoured submission, in part due to its relatively cheap and straightforward construction offered in its design.

On 24 May 1936, the Fi 156 V1, registered D-IKVN, performed its maiden flight; it was quickly followed by a further four prototypes. From an early stage, the company had envisioned two different production versions, the Fi 156A and Fi 156B, the latter having movable leading edge slots instead of the formers' fixed slot arrangement. The first production standard aircraft were delivered in early 1937.

=== German production ===
About 2,900 Fi 156s, the majority being of the Fi 156C model, were produced between 1937 and 1945. The principal production line was at the Fieseler Factory in Kassel. During 1942, production started in the Morane-Saulnier factory at Puteaux in France. Due to the demand for Fieseler as a subcontractor for building the Fw 190, Fi 156 production was shifted to Leichtbau Budweis in Budweis by the end of 1943. Factories in other countries under German control manufactured aircraft, including Fi 156s, for Germany.

=== Soviet production ===
In 1939, after the signing of the Molotov–Ribbentrop Pact, Germany provided several aircraft, including the Fi 156C, to the Soviet Union. Oleg Antonov was made responsible for putting the aircraft into production to meet Soviet requirements, and given a choice between designing an equivalent aircraft or copying the German design, the latter was selected. The aircraft was titled OKA-38 and two versions were envisaged: the SS three seat liaison aircraft, and the N-2 air ambulance capable of carrying two stretchers plus a medic. A prototype was constructed in Factory No. 365, established on the basis of Lithuanian Military Aviation Works, in Kaunas, recently occupied Lithuania. The first prototype was built in Factory No. 23 in Leningrad and flew before the end of 1940. Production in Kaunas had just started when the factory was lost to the German advance in 1941. While Antonov's efforts had produced a heavier aircraft, which required as much as three times the field for landing and take off as the German Fi 156C (160 m vs 55 m), it also had much greater range and increased load capability. After the conflict, Antonov went on to design the legendary An-2 STOL biplane, which also has excellent STOL performance.

=== Production in Czechoslovakia ===
In 1944, production was moved from the Leichtbau Budweis to the Mráz factory in Choceň which produced 138 examples of the Fi 156, locally designated as "K-65 Čáp" (i.e. stork in Czech). Production ended during 1949.

=== Production in France ===
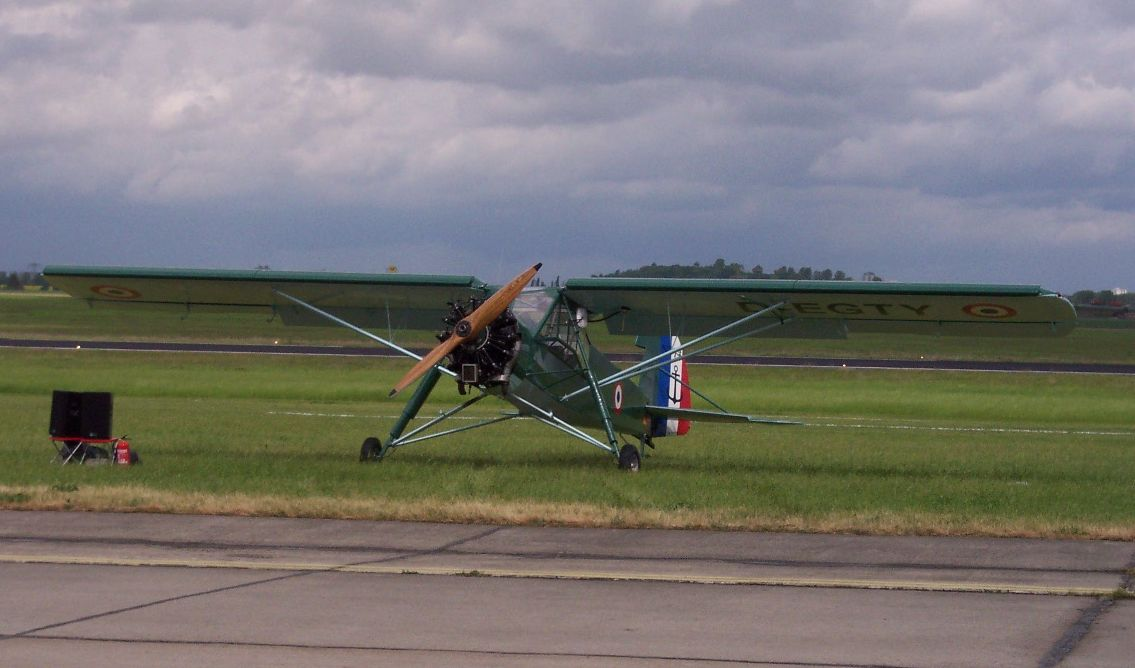
Morane-Saulnier MS.505 Criquet

During the Second World War, the French manufacturer Morane-Saulnier was operated under German control, during which time it built German types including the Storch. Immediately after the liberation of France in 1944, the production of the Fi 156 at the Morane-Saulnier factory was continued at the request of the Armée de l'Air. The resulting batch of aircraft produced with the remaining stock of Argus air-cooled inverted V8 engines were designated MS 500 Criquet. Aircraft with further modifications and different engines (inline and radial) received various different type numbers. The use of the aircraft in Indochina highlighted the weakness of wood for the construction of the airframe; thus it was decided to build the wings out of metal instead. Among the modifications, the defensive weapon aiming through the back window was dropped, although some aircraft were modified in the field to take a MAC 34T machine gun firing through one of the side windows. Some 141 aircraft were built before the end of the Second World War while a total of 925 aircraft were built before the end of the production of all types of Criquet by Morane-Saulnier in 1965.

=== Production in Romania ===
Licence production was started in Romania in October 1943 at the ICAR factory in Bucharest. Only 10 were built by the time the ICAR factory was bombed in May 1944. Production resumed later that year, but only six were completed before repair work halted production. Between June 1945 and 1946, a further 64 aircraft were built.

=== Summary of production ===
Production per factory and per type until 31 March 1945:

Type	Fieseler	Morane-Saulnier	Mraz	Leichtbau	Total
A-0	10				10
B-0	14				14
B-1	36				36
C-1	286				286
C-2	239				239
C-3	1,230	525			1,755
C-7		259	32	63	354
D-1	117				117
D-2			46	10	56
Total	1,908	784	78	73	2,867

=== Modern developments ===
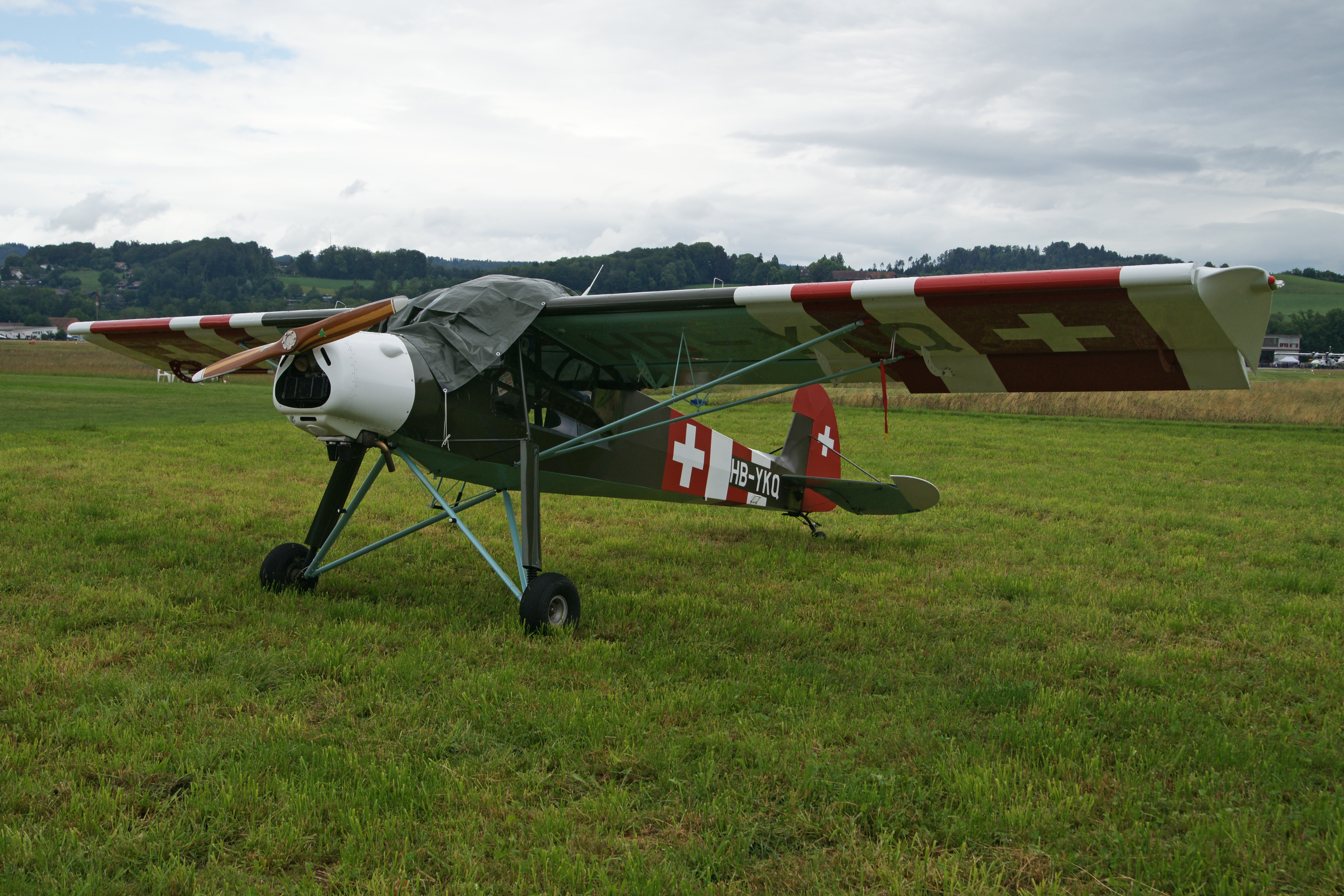
Slepcev Storch

Because of its superb STOL characteristics, there have been many attempts to recreate or copy the Storch, mainly in the form of various three-quarter scale homebuilt aircraft, such as the Pazmany PL-9 Stork, Roger Mann's RagWing RW19 Stork, and Preceptors STOL King.

As an example, the Slepcev Storch is a three-quarter scale reproduction of the original with some simplifications. The use of modern materials provides better STOL performance than the original with a take-off run of 30 m and landing-roll of 50 m with no headwind. It was originally designed and manufactured in Australia and is now manufactured in Serbia.

== Design ==
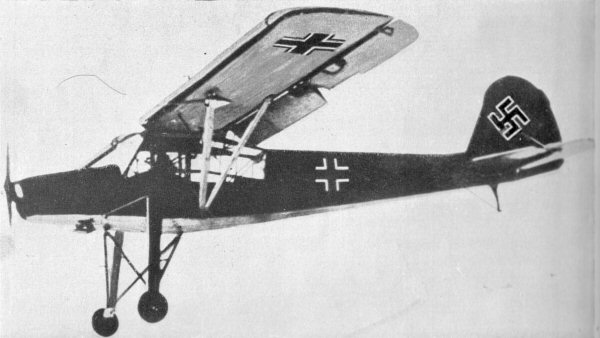
Fi 156 in flight

The Fieseler Fi 156 Storch was a high-wing monoplane that was particularly effective at short take off and landing ("STOL"). Its nickname of Storch was derived from the lengthy legs of its main landing gear, which hung down during flight and gave the aircraft the appearance of a long-legged, big-winged bird. As a product of its relatively low landing speed, the Storch often gave the appearance of landing vertically, or even backwards, when flying directly into strong winds. The aircraft was typically crewed by three personnel seated with its enclosed cabin, which was extensively glazed as to provide generous external views. The structure was composed of welded steel tubing while the covering was fabric. Both the tail unit and wings were composed of wood, the latter being clad in plywood.

The Fi 156 had relatively lengthy wings for its size. A fixed slat ran along the entire length of the wing's leading edge while a hinged and slotted set of control surfaces ran along the entire length of trailing edge. This arrangement was allegedly inspired by an earlier Junkers wing design concept, referred to as a Doppelflügel or "double-wing" aircraft wing control surface. On the Fi 156, this setup along each wing panel's trailing edge was split nearly 50/50 between the inboard-located flaps and outboard-located ailerons, which, in turn, included trim tab devices over half of each aileron's trailing edge length. This combination of flaps and slats has been heavily attributed for the aircraft's favourable STOL performance.

An uncommon feature for land-based aircraft was the ability to fold back the wings of the aircraft along the fuselage, which was somewhat similar to the wings of the Royal Navy's Fairey Swordfish torpedo bomber; when folded, the aircraft could be carried on a trailer or even directly towed (albeit slowly) behind a vehicle. The primary hinge for the folding wing was located in the wing root, where the rear wing spar met the cabin.

The long legs of the main landing gear were furnished with both oil and spring-based shock absorbers that had a travel of 40 cm (15-3/4 inches), sufficient to permit landings on comparatively rough and uneven surfaces; this was combined with a "pre-travel" distance of 20 cm, before the oleos began damping the landing gear shock.

While initial models were unarmed, starting with the C-2 variant, the Fi 156 was fitted with a raised, fully-glazed position for a flexible rear-firing MG 15 7.92mm machine gun for self-defense.

== Operational history ==
=== Second World War ===
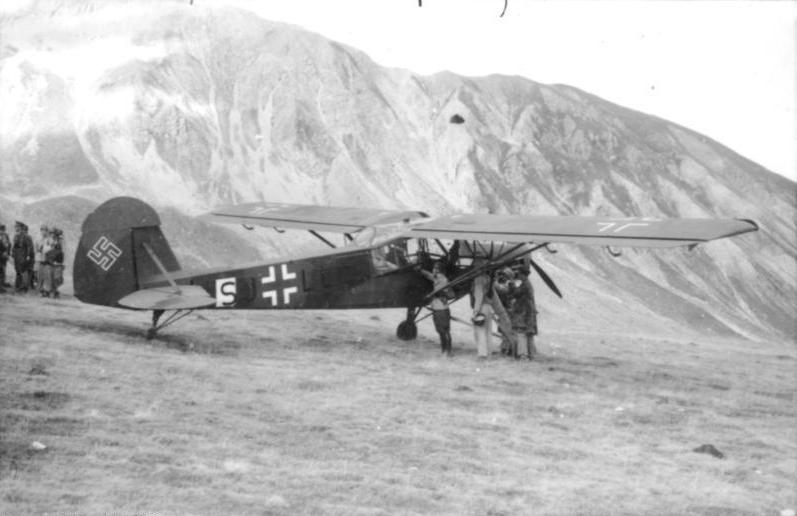
The Storch involved in Mussolini's rescue in the Gran Sasso raid.

The Storch was extensively operated by the Luftwaffe. Several reconnaissance units operated the type, such as Aufklärungsgruppe 14 and Aufklärungsgruppe 21. Furthermore, each Geschwader was provided with at least one, if not multiple, Fi 156s. Numerous high ranking German officials, particularly members of the General Staff, had their own Fi 156s, including Field Marshals Albert Kesselring and Erwin Rommel.

Throughout the Second World War, the Fi 156 was deployed in quantity to virtually all theatres that Nazi Germany was militarily active upon; as such, it saw usage in the Eastern Front, Western Front, the Western Desert, and even the Arctic.

During the German invasion of Belgium, in addition to its more routine usage in the liaison role, around 100 Fi 156s were used to transport a battalion of Infantry Regiment Grossdeutschland, two men per aircraft, landing on a stretch of road behind enemy lines (Operation Niwi).

During the North African campaign, the Afrika Korps made routine use of the Storch both for transportation and to conduct aerial surveillance. It was also operated by a pair of dedicated desert rescue squadrons to retrieve stranded pilots in this theatre.

During September 1943, the Storch played a pivotal role in Operation Eiche, the rescue of deposed Italian dictator Benito Mussolini from a boulder-strewn mountain-top near the Gran Sasso. Even though the mountain was surrounded by Italian troops, German commando Otto Skorzeny and 90 paratroopers used gliders to land on the peak and quickly captured it, then faced the problem of getting back. A Focke-Achgelis Fa 223 helicopter was sent, but it broke down en route. Instead, pilot Heinrich Gerlach flew in a Storch. It landed in 30 m (100 ft), and after Mussolini and Skorzeny boarded, it took off after a run of 80 m (250 ft), even though the aircraft was overloaded. The Storch used in rescuing Mussolini bore the radio code letters, or Stammkennzeichen, of "SJ + LL" in the motion picture coverage of the daring rescue.

On 26 April 1945, a Storch was one of the last aircraft to land on the improvised airstrip in the Tiergarten near the Brandenburg Gate during the Battle of Berlin and the death throes of Nazi Germany. It was flown by the test pilot Hanna Reitsch, who flew Generalfeldmarschall Robert Ritter von Greim from Munich to Berlin to answer a summons from Hitler.

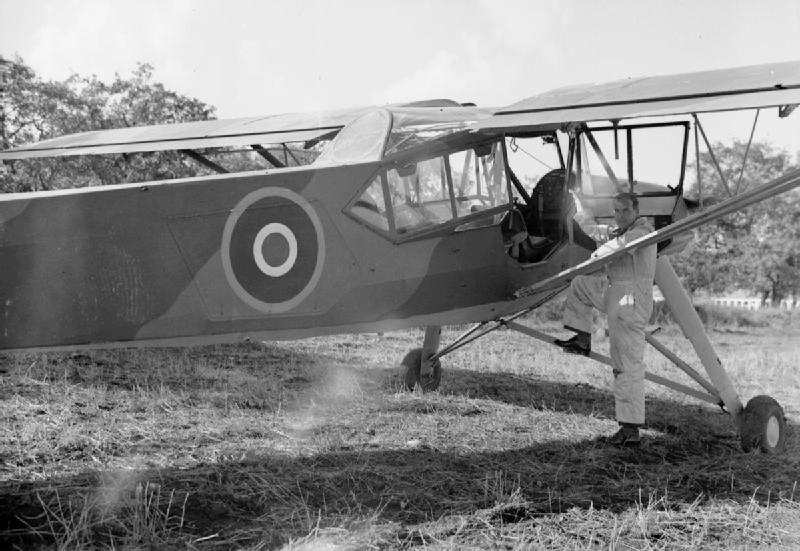
Air Vice Marshal Harry Broadhurst and his Storch, Italy, 1943

A Storch was the final aircraft to be shot down by the Allies on the Western Front, and another was forced down by an L-4 Grasshopper, the military version of the American Piper J-3 Cub civilian training and sport aircraft and a direct Allied counterpart of the Storch. The pilot and co-pilot of the L-4, lieutenants Duane Francis and Bill Martin, opened fire on the Storch with their .45 caliber pistols, forcing the German air crew to land and surrender.

During the conflict, several Störche were captured by the Allies. One became the personal aircraft of British Field Marshal Bernard Montgomery. Others were used as the personal aircraft of Air Vice Marshal Arthur Coningham and Air Vice Marshal Harry Broadhurst, who acquired his Storch in North Africa, and flew it subsequently in Italy and North-West Europe. The British captured 145 Fi 156s, of which 64 were given to the French as war compensation from Germany.

=== Postwar activities ===
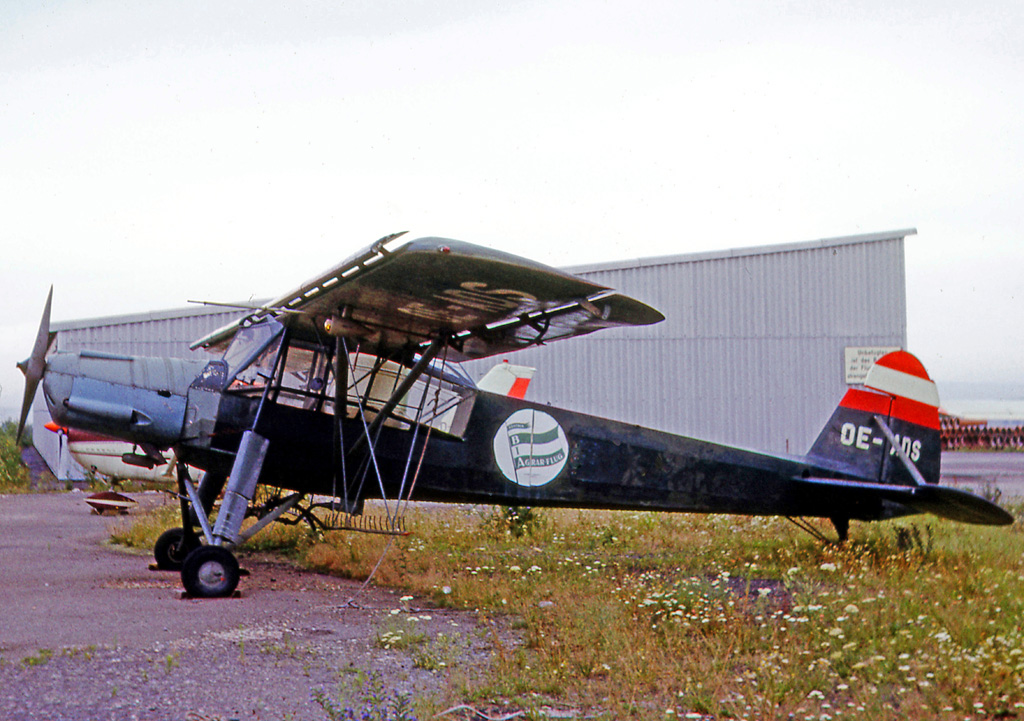
An Austrian-registered Storch fitted with spraying equipment at Stuttgart Airport in 1965

Both the French Air Force (Armée de l'Air) and the French Army Light Aviation (Aviation Légère de l'Armée de Terre) operated the Criquet between 1945 and 1958. Accordingly, the type saw battlefield service in French hands during both the Indochina War and the Algerian War.

The Swiss Air Force, as well as several other mountainous European countries, continued to use the Storch to conduct rescue operations in challenging terrain where STOL performance was necessary. One of the more historically significant operations involving the type was the Gauli Glacier crash rescue in November 1946, where a pair of Flugwaffe-flown Storches were the sole means of safely retrieving the twelve survivors of the crash. After the Second World War, numerous aircraft were used in utility roles, including agricultural spraying. Even into the twenty-first century, numerous Storches have remained operational, the type has become a common sight at air shows. In North America, both the Collings Foundation and the Fantasy of Flight museum have airworthy Fi 156 Storch aircraft in their collections.

== Variants ==
- Fi 156 V1: Prototype equipped with an adjustable metal propeller, registration D-IKVN (produced in 1935–1936)
- Fi 156 V2: Prototype equipped with a wooden propeller. First prototype to fly (May 10, 1936). registration D-IDVS (produced in 1935–1936)
- Fi 156 V3: Prototype identical to the V2. Test machine for various radio equipment, registration D-IGLI (produced in 1936)
- Fi 156 V4: Prototype identical to the V3. Skis for landing gear and disposable auxiliary tank. (produced in 1936–1937)
- Fi 156 V5: Production prototype for A-series. (produced in 1937)
- Fi 156 A-0: Pre-production aircraft, identical to the V3. Ten aircraft were produced. (produced in 1937–1938)
- Fi 156 A-1: First production models for service, ordered into production by the Luftwaffe with an order for 16 aircraft, the first production aircraft entered service in mid-1937. Some sources cite that only six were effectively produced. (produced in 1938)
- Fi 156 B: Fitted with a new system which could retract the normally fixed leading edge slats and had minor aerodynamic cleanups, boosting the speed to 208 km/h (130 mph). The Luftwaffe did not consider such a small difference to be important and the Fi-156 B was not produced.
- Fi 156 C-0: Pre-production. Essentially a "flexible" version of the A model. (produced in 1939)
- Fi 156 C-1: Three-seat liaison version. (produced in 1939–1940)
- Fi 156 C-2: Two-seat observation type, which had a raised, fully glazed rear dorsal gun position for mounting a MG 15 machine gun for defense. (produced in 1940)
- Fi 156 C-3: Replaced the C-1 and C-2 with a "universal cockpit" suited for any role. (produced in 1940–1941)
- Fi 156 C-3/Trop: Version adapted for tropical and desert conditions. Filtered intakes. (produced in 1940–1942)
- Fi 156 C-5: Addition of a belly hardpoint for a camera pod or jettisonable auxiliary tanks. Some were fitted with skis, rather than wheels, for operation on snow. (produced in 1941–1945)
- Fi 156 C-5/Trop: Version adapted for tropical and desert conditions. Filtered intakes. (produced in 1941–1945)
- Fi 156 C-7: Three-seat liaison version. "Flat" cockpit glazing similar to the C-1.
- Fi 156 D-0: Pre-production version of the air ambulance version of the C model with a larger cockpit and extra rear fuselage-location starboard-side door for stretcher accommodation. Powered by an Argus As 10P engine. (produced in 1941)
- Fi 156 D-1: Production version of the D-0. (produced in 1942–1945)
- Fi 156 E-0: Liaison version identical to the C-1; 10 pre-production aircraft were fitted with tracked landing gear and were produced in 1941–1942.
- Fi 156 F or P: Counter insurgency version. Identical to the C-3 with machine guns in side windows and bomb-racks and smoke layers. (produced in 1942)
- Fi 156 U: Anti-submarine version. Identical to the C-3 with depth charge. (produced in 1940)
- Fi 156 K-1: Export version of the C-1 (Bought by Sweden).
- Fi 256: A five-seat civil version; two were built by Morane-Saulnier.
- MS.500: Liaison version. French produced with 240 hp French built Argus engine, as the Fi 156 had used.
- MS.501: With a 233 hp Renault 6Q inverted, air-cooled "straight six" engine instead of the Argus inverted V8.
- MS.502: Liaison version. Identical to the MS-500, with the Argus engine replaced by a 230 hp Salmson 9ab radial engine.
- MS.504: with a 304 hp Jacobs R-755-A2 radial engine.
- MS.505: Observation version of the MS-500 with the Argus engine replaced by a 304 hp Jacobs R-755-A2 radial engine.
- MS.506: with a 235 hp Lycoming O-540 engine.
- Mráz K-65 Čáp: Production in Czechoslovakia after World War II.
- Antonov OKA-38 Aist ("stork" in Russian): An unlicensed Soviet copy of the Fi 156, powered by a copy of a Renault MV-6 inverted, air-cooled straight-six engine (similar to the Renault 6Q), was starting production as the factory was overrun by German forces in 1941

== Operators ==
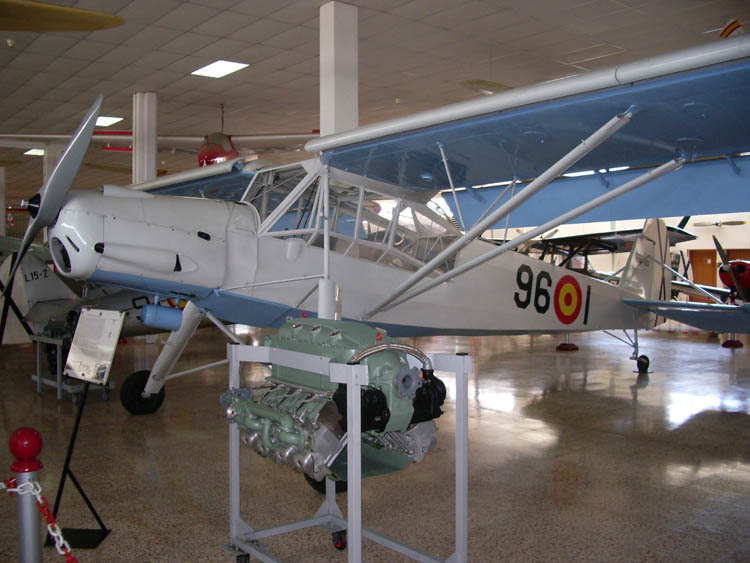
Spanish Air Force Fi 156 and Argus As 10 engine at the Museo del Aire in Madrid

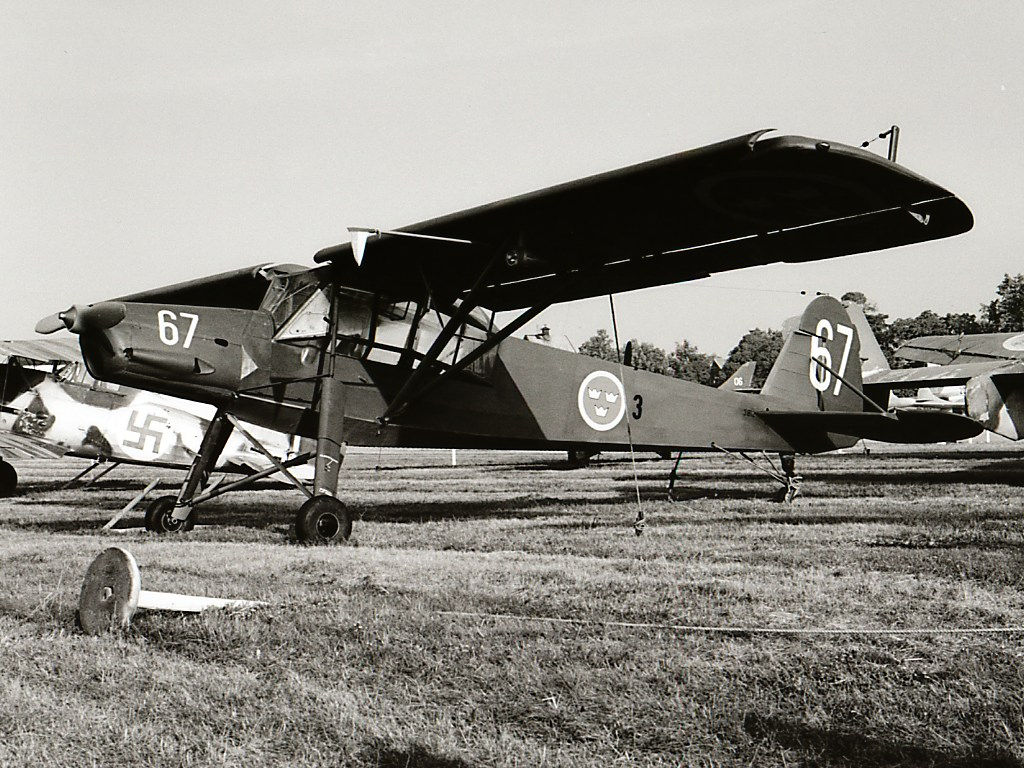
Swedish Air Force S14 (Fi 156)

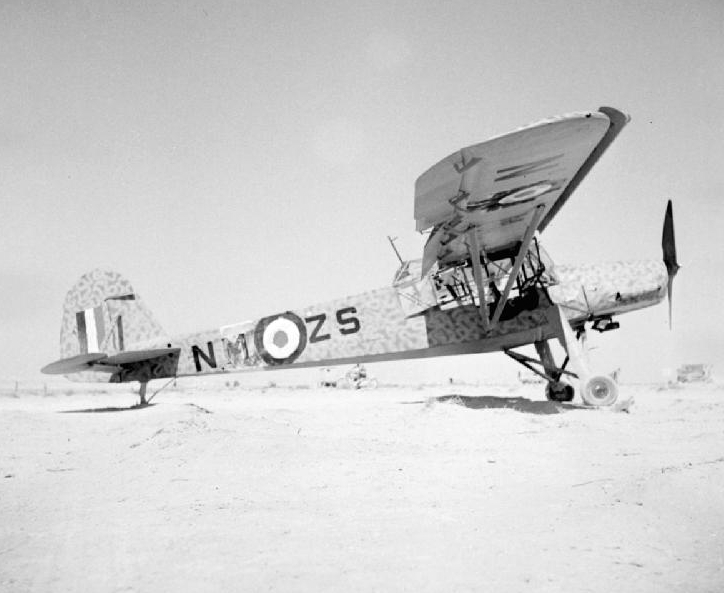
A captured German Fieseler Fi 156C-3/Trop Storch (ex "NM+ZS"), WkNr. 5620.

Bulgaria
Bulgarian Air Force
Cambodia
Royal Khmer Aviation - AVRK (Post war) and Khmer Air Force (KAF)
Croatia
Air Force of the Independent State of Croatia
Czechoslovakia

- Czechoslovak Air Force (Post war)
- Police aviation (cs) (Post war)

Egypt
Egyptian Air Force
Finland
Finnish Air Force
France

- French Air Force (Post war)
- French Navy (Post war)
- French Army (Post war)

Germany
Luftwaffe
United Kingdom
Royal Air Force
Greece
Royal Hellenic Air Force (Post war)
Hungary
Royal Hungarian Air Force
Italy
Regia Aeronautica
Laos
Royal Lao Air Force (Post war)
Morocco

- Royal Moroccan Air Force (Post war)

Norway
Royal Norwegian Air Force (Post war)
Poland

- Polish Air Force (Post war)
- Polish Navy (Post war)

Romania

- Royal Romanian Air Force
- Romanian Air Force (Post war)

Slovakia
Slovak Air Force (1939–1945)
South Vietnam
Republic of Vietnam Air Force (Post war)
Soviet Union
Soviet Air Force
Spain
Spanish Air Force
Sweden
Swedish Air Force
Switzerland
Swiss Air Force
Kingdom of Yugoslavia
Yugoslav Royal Air Force
Yugoslavia
SFR Yugoslav Air Force

== Surviving aircraft ==
=== Argentina ===
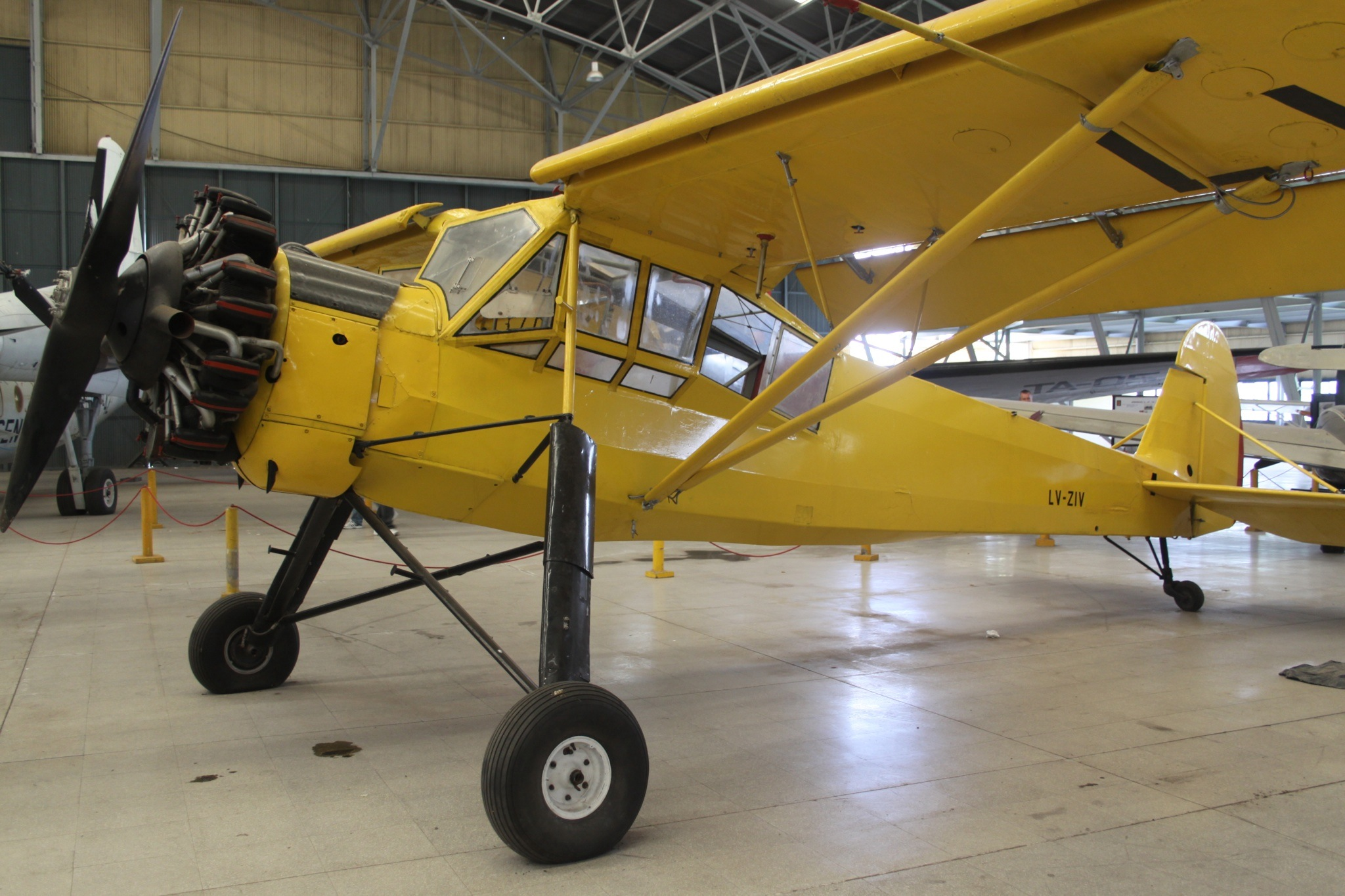
Morane-Saulnier MS.502 Criquet, Museo Nacional de Aeronáutica de Argentina, 2012

- MS.502 Criquet at the Museo Nacional de Aeronáutica, at Morón, Buenos Aires.

=== Austria ===
- 110253 – Fi 156 on static display at the Museum of Military History in Vienna, Austria.

=== Belgium ===
- 5503 – S-14B on static display at the Royal Museum of the Armed Forces and Military History in Brussels, Brussels.

Brazil

- MS.505 Criquet on display at the Museu Aeroespacial Paulista (MAPA), Campo de Marte Airport, São Paulo.

=== Finland ===
- 4230/39 – Fi 156 K-1 on display at the Finnish Aviation Museum in Vantaa, Uusimaa. It is the only surviving Finnish Air Force Storch. It retains its civilian paint scheme and registration, OH-FSA, from its final owner. It previously carried the serial number ST-112 and the registration OH-VSF.

=== Germany ===
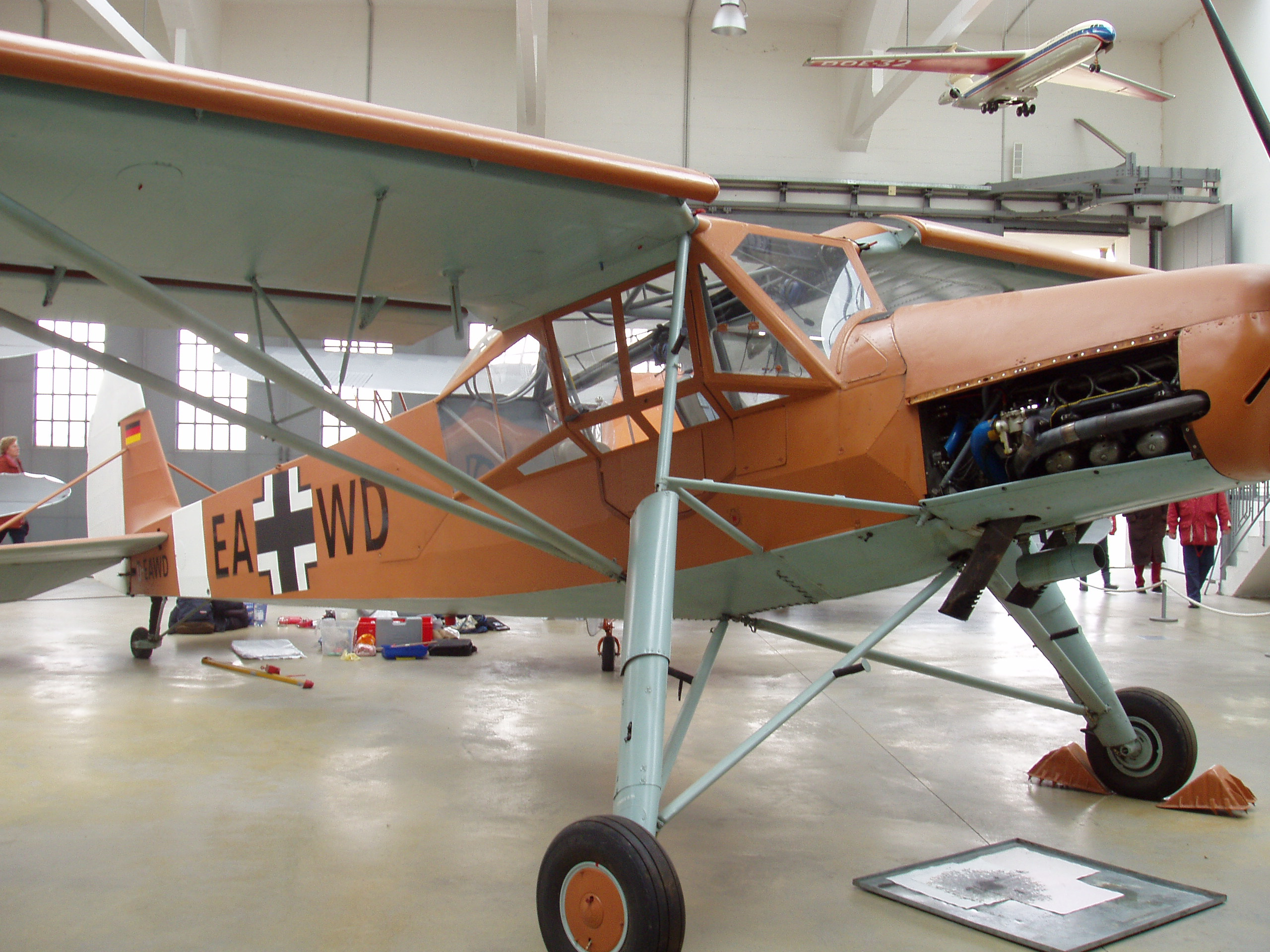
Fi 156 displayed in the Deutsches Museum Flugwerft Schleissheim

- 73 – MS.505 airworthy at the Fliegendes Museum in Großenhain, Saxony. It is registered as D-EGTY and is painted in French Air Force colors.
- 637 – MS.500 on static display at the Militärhistorisches Museum Flugplatz Berlin-Gatow.
- 4299 – Fi 156 C-3 on static display at the Deutsches Museum in Munich, Bavaria.
- 110062 – Fi 156 C-3 on static display at the Deutsches Technikmuseum in Berlin.
- 110254 – S-14 on static display at the Technik Museum Speyer in Speyer, Rhineland-Palatinate.
- Composite – Fi 156 C-3 airworthy at the Deutsches Museum Flugwerft Schleissheim in Munich, Bavaria.

=== Italy ===
- MM12822 – Fi 156 C-3/Trop on display at the Italian Air Force Museum, located on the former Vigna di Valle Air Base in Bracciano near Rome.

=== Norway ===
- 43 – MS.500 airworthy in Fetsund, Akershus. It has been restored as a Fi 156 C-3.
- Composite – MS.500 on display at the Sola Aviation Museum in Stavanger, Rogaland. It has been converted to resemble a Fi 156 C-2 during restoration.
- 2088 – Fi 156 A-1. It was restored by Peter Holloway, Shuttleworth Collection and is currently registered as LN-STC.

=== Serbia ===
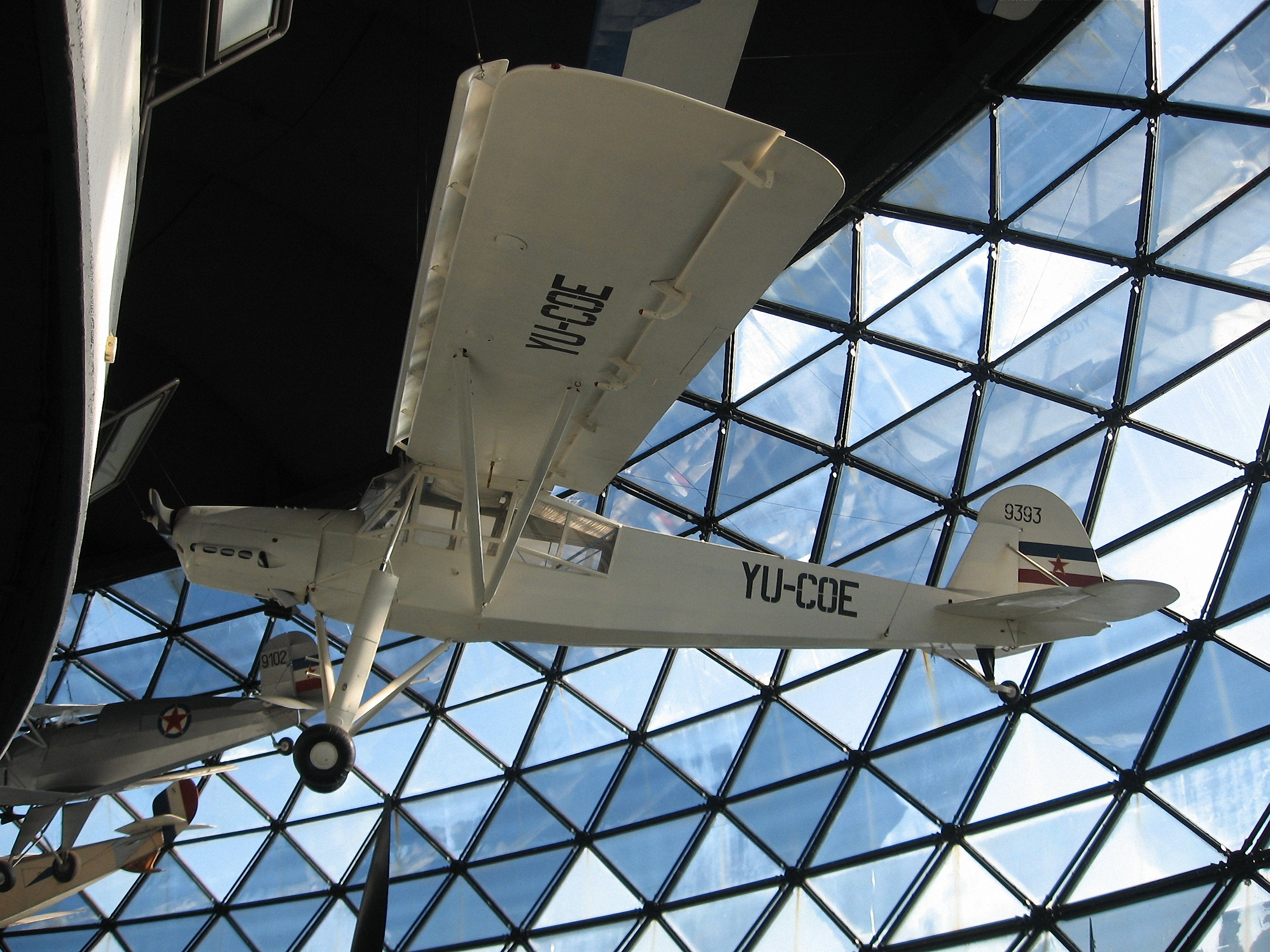
Yugoslav Air Force K-65 at Belgrade Aviation Museum, Serbia.

- c/n 91 – Mráz K-65 Čáp on static display at the Belgrade Aviation Museum in Surčin, Belgrade. It was converted to a medical transport and has the registration YU-COE.

=== South Africa ===
- 475099 – Fi 156 C-7 airworthy at the South African Air Force Museum at Air Force Base Swartkop in Centurion, Gauteng. It is painted in the Luftwaffe markings VT+TD. It was acquired by the South African Air Force in 1946.

=== Spain ===
- Composite – Fi 156 C-3 on display at the Museo del Aire in Madrid.

=== Switzerland ===
- 1685 – Fi 156 C-3 on static display at the Flieger-Flab-Museum in Dubendorf, Zurich.
- 8063 – Fi 156 C-3/Trop on static display at the Swiss Museum of Transport in Lucerne, Lucerne.

=== United Kingdom ===
- 475081 – Fi 156 C-7 on static display at the Kent Battle of Britain Museum at Hawkinge, after its donation and transfer in late June 2025 from the Royal Air Force Museum Cosford in Cosford, Shropshire.

=== United States ===
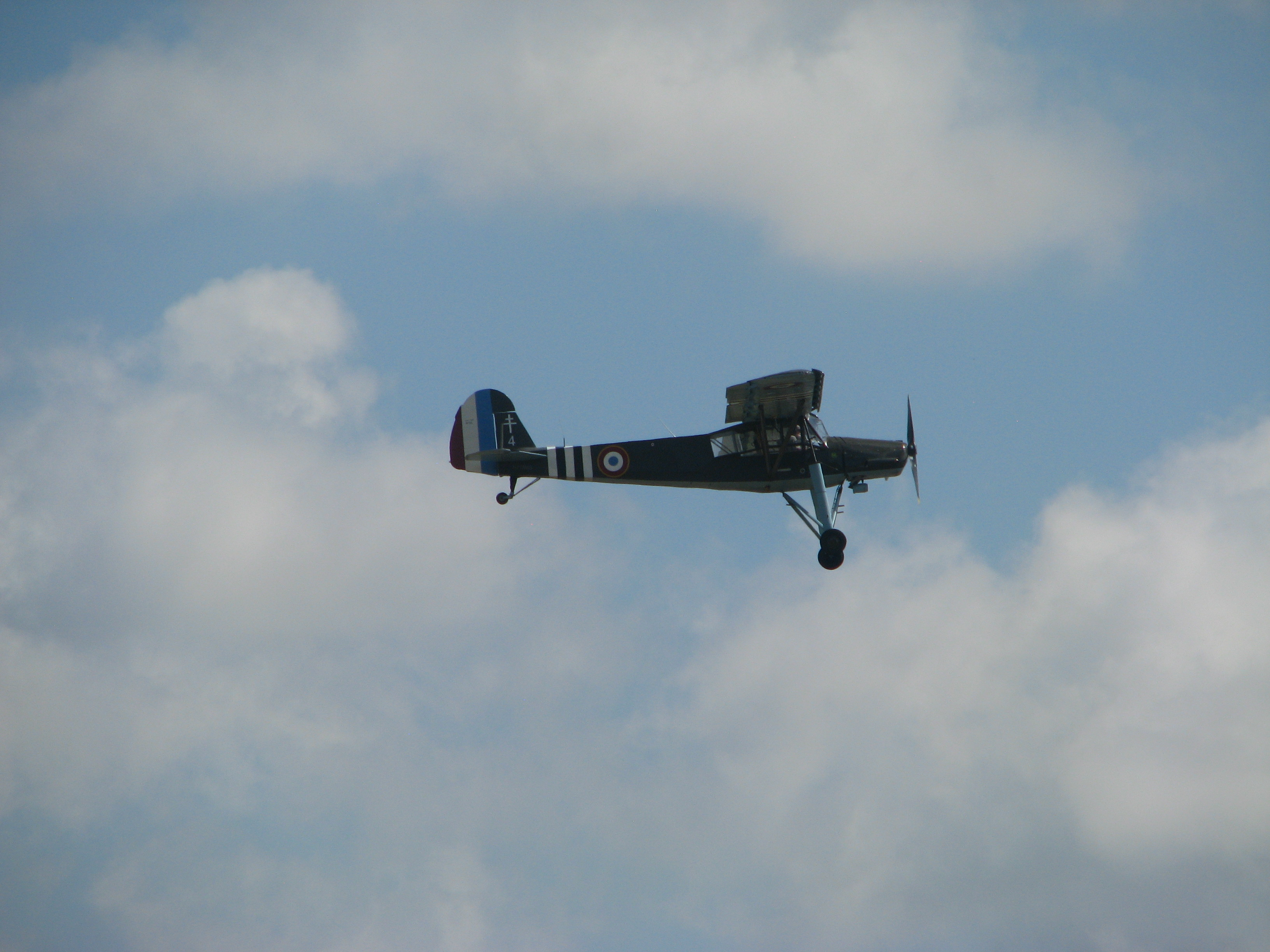
N778MS, a privately owned MS.500 flying at the Wings Over Houston airshow, October 2019.

- 4 – MS.500 airworthy with a private owner in Seabrook, Texas. It is registered as N778MS.
- 381 – MS.502 on static display at the Planes of Fame Air Museum in Chino, California.
- 724 – MS.500 on static display at the Pima Air & Space Museum in Tucson, Arizona.
- 728 – MS.502 airworthy at the War Eagles Air Museum in Santa Teresa, New Mexico.
- 1024 – MS.500 D2 under restoration to airworthiness with the Southern California Wing of the Commemorative Air Force in Camarillo, California.
- 3452 – Fi 156 C-7 airworthy with a private owner in Bentonville, Arkansas. It is registered as N156SF.
- 3808 – Fi 156 C-1 on static display at the National Museum of the United States Air Force in Dayton, Ohio. It was built in 1940.
- 4362 – Fi 156 C-2 airworthy at the Flying Heritage & Combat Armor Museum in Everett, Washington.
- 4621 – MS.500 airworthy with the American Heritage Museum in Hudson, Massachusetts. bearing the Geschwaderkennung "B1+BB" of a Luftwaffe "flight-readiness" support unit.
- 4642 – MS.500 airworthy at the Fantasy of Flight museum in Polk City, Florida.
- Unknown ID – MS.500 in storage at the Paul E. Garber Preservation, Restoration, and Storage Facility of the National Air and Space Museum in Suitland, Maryland.

== Specifications (Fi 156C-2) ==

Data from The Warplanes of the Third Reich

General characteristics

- Crew: 2
- Length: 9.91 m (32 ft 6 in)
- Wingspan: 14.25 m (46 ft 9 in)
- Height: 3.05 m (10 ft 0 in)
- Wing area: 26 m^{2} (280 sq ft)
- Empty weight: 930 kg (2,050 lb)
- Gross weight: 1,324 kg (2,920 lb)
- Powerplant: 1 × Argus As 10 V-8 inverted air-cooled piston engine, 180 kW (240 hp)
- Propellers: 2-bladed

Performance

- Maximum speed: 175 km/h (109 mph, 95 kn) at sea level
- Cruise speed: 130 km/h (81 mph, 70 kn) (economic cruise)
- Range: 390 km (240 mi, 210 nmi) at 150 km/h (93 mph; 81 kn) and 1,000 m (3,280 ft)
- Service ceiling: 4,600 m (15,090 ft)
- Rate of climb: 4.60 m/s (905 ft/min)

Armament

- Guns: 1 × MG 15 machine gun

== See also ==
Related development

- Carlson Criquet a three-quarter scale variant for homebuilders
- Fieseler Fi 97
- Pazmany PL-9 Stork a three-quarter scale variant for homebuilders
- RagWing RW19 Stork a three-quarter scale variant for homebuilders
- Slepcev Storch a three-quarter scale variant for homebuilders
- Criquet Storch a three-quarter scale variant

Aircraft of comparable role, configuration, and era

- Henschel Hs 126
- Kobeseiko Te-Gō
- Kokusai Ki-76
- Meridionali Ro.63
- Messerschmitt Bf 163
- Miles Messenger
- Piper L-4
- Polikarpov Po-2
- Repülőgépgyár Levente II
- Ryan YO-51 Dragonfly
- Siebel Si 201
- Stinson L-1 Vigilant
- Westland Lysander

Related lists

- List of aircraft of World War II
- List of military aircraft of Germany
- List of non-carrier aircraft flown from aircraft carriers
