= Little Wing Roto-Pup =

American homebuilt gyroplane

Roto-Pup

General information
- Type: Autogyro
- National origin: United States
- Manufacturer: Little Wing Autogyros, Inc.
- Status: Production completed
- Number built: 3 (1998)

The Little Wing Roto-Pup is an American autogyro that was designed and produced by Little Wing Autogyros, Inc. of Mayflower, Arkansas, introduced in the 1990s. Now out of production, when it was available the aircraft was supplied as a kit for amateur construction.

== Design and development ==
The Roto-Pup was designed to comply with the US FAR 103 Ultralight Vehicles rules, including the category's maximum empty weight of 254 lb (115 kg). The aircraft has a standard empty weight of 250 lb (113 kg). It features a single main rotor, a single-seat open cockpit with a windshield and conventional landing gear without wheel pants. The acceptable power range is 45 to 70 hp (34 to 52 kW) and the standard engine used is a twin cylinder, air-cooled, two-stroke, single-ignition 45 hp (34 kW) 2si 460 engine in tractor configuration.

The aircraft fuselage is made from welded 4130 steel tubing and is based on the Preceptor Ultra Pup airframe. The airframe may be covered with dope and fabric or left uncovered. To meet the FAR 103 Ultralight Vehicles empty weight, the frame is required to be left uncovered, but this does not affect aircraft handling. The cockpit width is 24 in (61 cm).

The Roto-Pup's two-bladed rotor has a diameter of 23 ft (7.0 m). The aircraft has a typical empty weight of 250 lb (110 kg) and a gross weight of 550 lb (250 kg), giving a useful load of 300 lb (140 kg). With full fuel of 5 U.S. gallons (19 L; 4.2 imp gal) the payload for the pilot and baggage is 270 lb (120 kg).

The aircraft uses an unusual control system, common to all the Little Wing Autogyros and designed by David Kay in the early 1930s. It uses a mast that is fixed fore-and-aft, but which pivots laterally for banking the aircraft. Longitudinal control is achieved by an elevator and horizontal stabilizer system, designed to eliminate power-induced bunting "push-over" accidents.

The standard day, sea level, no wind, take off with a 45 hp (34 kW) engine is 200 ft (61 m) and the landing roll is 50 ft (15 m).

The manufacturer estimated the construction time from the supplied kit as 200 hours.

== Operational history ==
By 1998 the company reported that 13 kits had been sold and three aircraft were completed and flying.

== Specifications (Roto-Pup) ==
Data from Purdy and Cliche

General characteristics

- Crew: one
- Length: 16 ft 0 in (4.88 m)
- Height: 8 ft 6 in (2.59 m)
- Empty weight: 250 lb (113 kg)
- Gross weight: 550 lb (249 kg)
- Fuel capacity: 5 U.S. gallons (19 L; 4.2 imp gal)
- Powerplant: 1 × 2si 460 two cylinder, air-cooled, two stroke aircraft engine, 45 hp (34 kW)
- Main rotor diameter: × 23 ft 0 in (7.01 m)
- Main rotor area: 415 sq ft (38.6 m^{2})
- Propellers: 2-bladed wooden fixed pitch

Performance

- Maximum speed: 64 mph (103 km/h, 56 kn)
- Cruise speed: 50 mph (80 km/h, 43 kn)
- Range: 50 mi (80 km, 43 nmi)
- Service ceiling: 10,000 ft (3,000 m)
- Rate of climb: 800 ft/min (4.1 m/s)
- Disk loading: 1.3 lb/sq ft (6.3 kg/m^{2})

Avionics

- none

== See also ==
- List of rotorcraft
