= Pazmany PL-4 =

PL-4A

General information
- Type: Amateur-built aircraft
- National origin: United States
- Manufacturer: Pazmany Aircraft Corporation/Homebuilt
- Designer: Ladislao Pazmany
- Number built: more than 50

History
- First flight: 12 July 1972

The Pazmany PL-4A is a single-seat, single-engine sport aircraft developed in the United States and first flown in 1972. It is marketed for homebuilding from plans, and 686 sets had sold by 1985. The PL-4A is a conventional, low-wing cantilever monoplane with an enclosed cabin and fixed, tailwheel undercarriage. The design features a T-tail, chosen to facilitate folding the wings. Construction throughout is of metal, using standard extruded sections for the longerons and pop rivets as the basic fastener. The standard powerplant is a Volkswagen air-cooled engine of 60 hp (45 kW) Construction time is estimated to be around 1,000–1,500 hours.

The PL-4A won the "Outstanding New Design" and "Outstanding Contribution to Low-Cost Flying" awards at the 1972 EAA Fly-In. By 2000 more than 50 had been built and flown.

== Variants ==
Pazmany PL-4A
Standard single seater, normally powered by a 60 hp (45 kW) Volkswagen air-cooled engine with V-belt drive reduction.
Denight 100 D2 Special
Modified PL4A design to seat two side by side. Main differences are an increase in length by 17 in (450 mm) and in fuselage width by 12 in (305 mm), a more powerful 115 hp (86 kW) Avco Lycoming O-235 flat-four engine and a conventional tail. Maximum take-off weight is 1,250 lb (567 kg).

== Specifications ==
Data from Jane's All the World's Aircraft 1985–86, p.608

General characteristics

- Crew: One pilot
- Length: 16 ft 7 in (5.04 m)
- Wingspan: 26 ft 8 in (8.13 m)
- Height: 5 ft 8 in (1.73 m)
- Wing area: 89 sq ft (8.3 m^{2})
- Empty weight: 578 lb (262 kg)
- Gross weight: 850 lb (385 kg)
- Powerplant: 1 × Converted Volkswagen air-cooled engine , 50 hp (38 kW)

Performance

- Maximum speed: 125 mph (201 km/h, 109 kn)
- Range: 340 mi (545 km, 300 nmi)
- Service ceiling: 13,000 ft (3,960 m)
- Rate of climb: 650 ft/min (3.3 m/s)
