= Ladislao Pazmany =

Hungarian-American aeronautical engineer

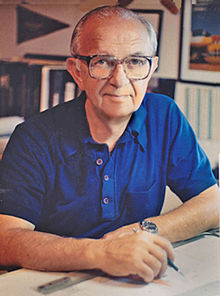
Aviation pioneer Ladislao Pazmany (November 25, 1923 – August 21, 2006) was an aeronautical engineer, designer, builder, pilot, teacher, speaker and author.

Ladislao Pazmany (November 25, 1923 – August 21, 2006) was an aviation pioneer, aeronautical engineer, designer, pilot, teacher, speaker, and author. Born in Hungary, Pazmany grew up, went to school, and worked in his formative years in Argentina. He later moved to the United States, where he spent the rest of his life.

Pazmany has become recognized as a world authority on landing gear, light aircraft, and flight efficiencies through his books, plans, and planes. His contributions include the Pazmany PL-1 and PL-2, which were used for training; the PL-4A, a single seat VW powered, T-Tailed with folding wings; and the PL-9 Stork which is a ¾ adaptation of the Luftwaffe short takeoff and landing (STOL) warbird. He was inducted into the Experimental Aircraft Association Hall of Fame in 1997 for his work on homebuilt aircraft.

== Ancestry ==
The Pazmanys are a Hungarian family of landed gentry. They trace their ancestry back to the Middle Ages, to the Jesuit Cardinal Peter Pazmany, who codified the literary Hungarian language. Peter Pazmany was known for his skill as an orator and essayist, and his writing style was characterized by a vigorous and clear, although not necessarily simplistic, use of popular expressions and solid arguments. He played a key role in the Counter-Reformation in Hungary and is regarded as a national figure, honored with the founding of a university in Budapest, which remains a prestigious seat of higher learning to this day.

== Childhood and early life ==
Ladislao's father, Zoltan, continued the literary tradition as a journalist and contributing writer. He spoke seven languages. After World War I, he moved his family, including his wife, Maria Kacelli, and young sons, Ladislao and Zoltan, from the rural enclave of Zenta to Buenos Aires, the capital city of Argentina, in 1926. They settled in the Padilla district, where the family prospered in their new home.

His interest in design engineering began with early model airplanes made of wood during his childhood in Argentina. Over the next six decades, Pazmany worked on gliders, small planes, jets, and missiles, both for private purchase and for the largest defense contractors in America including Convair, General Dynamics and Rohr. His contributions to unmanned stealth aircraft were used in action during the Iraq War in 2004.

Ladislao Pazmany made his first model plane at age five. He was encouraged by his father to visit the airports and train stations resulting in him developing an interest in trains, planes, motors, and engines. This interest led to his first flight, in gliders, at age 15. A prodigious student, the young Pazmany began teaching elementary aviation to adults while still a young man, and later graduated with an honors degree from the prestigious Otto Krause Technical School in Buenos Aires. He continued four years of aeronautical engineering study at the Universidad Nacional de La Plata.

Following his experience with gliders, Pazmany's first plane was a Piper J-3 Cub and then a Cessna, becoming a pilot at only 15 years old. As the barnstorming spirit was very much alive in him and his like-minded friends Pazmany learned to fly over the cow pastures and farmlands outside of Buenos Aires, logging hours and integrating hundreds of hours of practical flight experience into a growing knowledge of aeronautical engineering.

== Career ==
=== Buenos Aires, Argentina ===
For nearly a decade he designed aircraft, pipelines, high tension power lines, suspension bridges, chemical and hydroelectric plants, and was an instructor (at Raggio Escuela Tecnica), an aeronautical school in Buenos Aires. He also worked as an auto company draftsman, and at some point held 3 jobs at once.

He also worked for The Air Force of Argentina (Fuerza Aerea Argentina), Techint Engineering, the international conglomerate, and helped with the wing design of the Dewoitine 7–10.

After the end of World War II and a decade of political, social and economic unrest, the Peron regime ended and the many restrictions on professionals – including engineers, were lifted, allowing Ladislao Pazmany to pursue the unlimited possibilities of aeronautics in the United States, with its growing economy, expanding commercial aviation, and huge cold war contracts in the defense industry.

=== Immigration to the United States ===
In 1948, Ladislao Pazmany married Margarita Byro, a ballet dancer and an artist, also Hungarian with a similar ancestry. Ladislao and Margarita and had two young daughters when he arrived in San Diego, California in May 1956. With a house downtown just minutes from Lindbergh Field, Pazmany would make a home for his family, raise his children to maturity, become an American citizen, and years later have residence and office overlooking the airport and bay.

=== San Diego, California ===
“In 1953, the Soviets exploded a thermonuclear device and were supposedly working on ICBMs to carry uranium and hydrogen warheads. In reaction to this, in March 1954, the Western Development Division, a special missile command agency created by the Air Research and Development Command, awarded Convair its first long-term contract for engineering and fabrication of an ICBM.”

The threat of Soviet supremacy in the nuclear age heightened Cold War tensions and spurred an expansion of spending, research, and building in the defense industry that would continue unabated until the collapse of the Soviet Union in 1991. In addition to the strengthening of the American deterrent, great strides were made in aeronautics that spread and applied to all fields of aviation.

Pazmany quickly earned a position at Convair, which was a division of General Dynamics. He worked on the company's innovative Delta wing-designed jets – the Convair F-102 Delta Dagger an interceptor plane that was known as the "Deuce" and used in Vietnam, and the more advanced Convair F-106 Delta Dart a supersonic jet technology which prevailed well into the 1980s.

During this period of about 25 years, starting with Convair, and General Dynamics, Pazmany also worked on aerostructures and engines at McDonnell Douglas. McDonnell Douglas was a specialist in fighter aircraft who merged with Boeing in 1967. At Rohr, Inc., he produced related components, including engine nacelles, thrust reversers, and mounting pylons for both military and commercial aircraft. Pazmany's engineering talents stretched from conventional prop-driven aircraft to jets, missiles, cruise missiles, and unmanned stealth craft, aero systems and parts. He earned seven patents for inventions for aircraft thrust reversers to emergency natural gas shut-off valves that activate during earthquakes.

He researched, analyzed and wrote the NASA contractor report: “Potential Structural Material and Design Concept For Light Airplanes” NASA CR93258" 1968, for mission analysis division. National Aeronautics Space Administration. Ames Research Center Moffett Field, California.

Pazmany then joined T. Claude Ryan (Lindbergh's Spirit of St. Louis is credited to Ryan) and his son in developing the Ryson ST-100 Cloudster, a tandem two seat motor glider that was intended for cross country flight.

“The Cloudster is a powered sailplane or an airplane that soars, whichever you prefer. As a touring airplane, it cruises at 135 mph (75-percentpower) using just 6 gph to yield a range of 690 miles. At lower power settings, the range can be greatly increased. Only 20-percent power is required to keep the Cloudster in level flight."

=== University teaching ===
From his defense work Pazmany introduced new concepts, innovations, principles and practices as a lecturer at both the University of California at San Diego (UCSD), 1979–1980; and San Diego State University (SDSU), 1975–1979. Subjects ranged widely from light aircraft design, engineering, and construction to larger, jet, missile, and space applications.

=== Experimental Aircraft Association ===
After only one month of arriving in the United States and getting his start at Convair, Ladislao Pazmany attended his first Experimental Aircraft Association (EAA) meeting – the EAA had been founded shortly before this, in January 1953 at Curtis-Wright Field in Milwaukee, Wisconsin. Led by Paul Poberezny and a small group of aviation enthusiasts who promoted sport aviation, these pilots quickly expanded their mission to include antiques, classics, warbirds, aerobatic aircraft, ultra-lights, helicopters, and contemporarily manufactured aircraft.

=== Planes ===
==== Pazmany PL-1 ====
The EAA chapter in San Diego began a group design project that evolved into Pazmany's own unique vision of a two-seat, side-by-side, low-wing, tri-cycled gear airplane that was stressed for aerobatics with a plus 9 and minus 4 1/2G ultimate load factor at full gross weight. It was planned to carry all its fuel in two 13 gallon fiberglass wing tip tanks. The "P" in the name came from Pazmany, the "L" was for Laminar, and the "1" to recognize that the design was a prototype. It would be quickly followed by an improved successor, the PL-2.

==== Pazmany PL-2 ====
The basic configuration of the PL-2 incorporates two-place, side by side seating, a low wing of rectangular plan form, and tricycle landing gear. The overall layout is compact and light compared with some other contemporary aircraft in the same category. The structure is stressed to + 6 g's limit for safety and aerobatics. Aluminum 2024-T3 is the basic material. Landing gear and engine mount are made from 4130 steel tubes and plates. There are no double curvature skins in the whole airplane. Very few formed blocks are necessary, considering that the wing and horizontal tail have constant chord. The wing has a 15% thickness laminar airfoil, with the single spar located at the maximum thickness and is assembled as a unit to the fuselage and can be removed in approximately two hours. The wing-fuselage connection is provided by two bolts at the main spar and two bolts at the rear spar. The seats form an integral structure with the wing. Also, the control sticks and flap control lever are directly attached to the wing structure. The elevator trim is located in a centre box between the seats. Aileron and flaps are piano-hinged to the bottom skin. The elevator trim is located in a centre box between the seats. Aileron and flaps are piano-hinged to the bottom skin. Ailerons are mass-balanced and push-pull controlled, having differential displacement. The three-position flaps run through the fuselage.

Top Speed 138. Stall 41 Rate of Climb 1200 Engine Lycoming Length 19.3 Wing Span 27.8

==== Trainers ====
“Due to Pazmany's great concern for safety his planes were used as trainers because they would respond exactly as expected to the requirements of flight"

Recommended by US Air Force personnel, Taiwan initially committed to build 70 PL-2s as a trainer for its military flying school at Kangshan during the early 1970s. At the time, Major-General Chao, vice-commander of the Air Academy, indicated that the academy was most pleased with the results of the program, although it was still in its infancy. Major-General T. M. Lee, commanding general of the Air Technical School, discussed the very substantial savings in airframe costs and a vital saving in training time for airframe mechanics. Because the cost of the program was only in the plans themselves, “Nationalist China may have picked up the smallest bill in history for the design of a military aircraft” and Pazmany's “yield comes largely from the satisfaction of knowing that many persons consider his aircraft the finest in its class".

Following the success of PL-1 and PL-2 as a military trainer in Taiwan, Indonesia, Vietnam, Thailand, Korea, Pakistan and Sri Lanka began pilot training programs of their own based on Pazmany-designed aircraft.

==== Pazmany PL-4A ====
The Pazmany PL-4A is a sport airplane intended to answer the need for a well designed, all-metal airplane which is easy to build, easy to fly, with low initial and operating costs, and folding wings so that it may be towed behind an automobile and stored at home. It is a low-wing airplane, VW-powered, with a closed or open cockpit large enough to accommodate even very large persons, and a generous baggage compartment. A "T" tail configuration improves rudder effectiveness and prevents the stabilator from interfering with the folded wings. Wing: In order to favor takeoff and climb performance, a high aspect ratio of 8 is used, which in combination with a large diameter, slow turning prop should provide good performance even at high altitude airports. The airfoil is the NACA 633418, which has a mild stall and a good overall performance even at “standard roughness.” The 18% thickness provides a deep spar, high torsional rigidity, and makes possible the simple, compact fittings at the wing folding joint, which are band-sawed from aluminum plate. The chord is constant at 40 in., and there is no washout. The ailerons have differential travel to minimize, adverse yaw. They are hinged at the bottom skin with standard piano hinges, as in the PL-1 and 2, providing smooth airflow over the top of the “down” aileron, and a good gap seal. The mass balance is concentrated in a lead weight attached to an arm extending into the wing box.

Single seat monoplane, Top Speed 120 mph. Stall 39 mph. Rate of Climb fpm 650. Length 16.5 Wing Span 26.7, Landing gear Tail Wheel.

The PL-4A won the "Outstanding New Design" and "Outstanding Contribution to Low-Cost Flying" awards at the 1972 EAA Fly-In.

==== Pazmany PL-9 Stork ====
The original German Luftwaffe Fieseler Fi 156 Storch was an outstanding WWII airplane, designed to take off and land in extremely short distances. The Storch had a take off ground roll of 131 feet and a landing roll of 36 feet with 13 miles per hour head wind. The Pazmany PL-9 Stork is a 3/4 replica, with the same flying and handling characteristics as the original German Aircraft. The PL-9 Stork is a professionally designed STOL aircraft. It has a well-proven aircraft configuration designed for a number of functions such as fish spotting, forest fire detection, farm work, missionary work, etc. It features a welded chrome alloy steel tube fuselage and aluminum sheet metal/fabric covered wings and empennage. The PL-9 Stork has a cruise speed of 104 mph with a standard Lycoming O-320/150 hp engine.

“The PL-9 was started in March 1990 with an extensive literature search. I acquired books, reports, manuals, microfilm reproductions and movies. I also talked with former Luftwaffe pilots who had flown the Storch." For the redesign of the PL-9 Stork maximum effort has been made to reproduce the performance of Fi-156." With PL-9, amateur builders were provided with a STOL aircraft which will please the sport pilot, the nostalgia pilot and the bush pilot.

“Pilots have always been fascinated by the Storch because it was capable of flying in and out of almost any open space and moping along at incredibly low airspeed when desired. The thought that occurs to any pilot is that one could fly the airplane with almost complete confidence that should engine failure occur, it could be landed anywhere within gliding range without fear of injury to its occupants.

The Stork is a high wing, two seat monoplane: Top Speed 116 mph. Stall 33 mph. Rate of Climb fpm 1400. Length 24.3 Wing Span 36, Landing gear Tail Wheel.

=== Pazmany Aircraft Corporation ===
Created in 1957, the Pazmany Aircraft Corporation was the organizational, financial and legal foundation to 50 years of business activity – planes, plans, books, videos, website, PDFs, e-books, and decades of meetings, fly-ins, conventions and international travel. It remains in operation today.

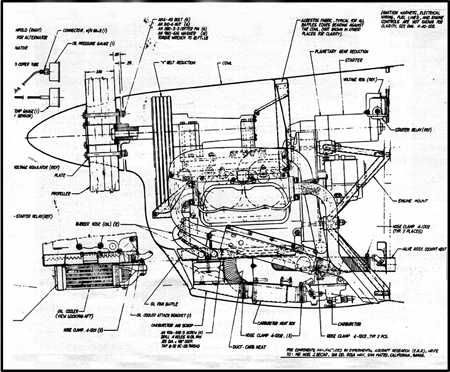
Close up of airplane engine, complete with propeller and mounts from a page of Pazmany blueprint plans for a Pazmany PL. This homebuilders plan uses high detail to aid amateur construction.

=== Plans ===
From his home office and workshop Pazmany quickly set new standards in the production of homebuilt aircraft plans, with an attention to detail that became his trademark "homebuilt plans must show more detail than a commercial or military model because the amateur needs more guidance and is unfamiliar with aircraft shop practices" he explained, and "with a complete bill of materials". The Pazmany the PL-2 redesign took 7000 man hours, with a specific objective – partially derived in conversations with other pilots – a structurally sound airframe but also a sensitivity of control, using primarily metal and fiberglass, have clean lines aerodynamically – and finally, it should be attractive. Twenty years later the Pazmany PL-9 Stork would require 9000 man hours of design before the prototype's first test.

Known as "Paz" to all of his friends and business associates, Pazmany was an excellent pilot with over a half century of consistent air hours who continually tracked, and recorded in-flight data that was used to re-formulate efficiencies, revise plans, rebuild parts and re-apply changes for flight. This was done in concert with the many brother pilots of the EAA. Results were shared and published in Engineering Change Notices (ECN) and regular newsletters for a number of years – as promised with a unique pledge by Pazmany to each homebuilder to assist, support and help them in the completion of their aircraft

Thousands of sets of plans have been sold worldwide, and planes built and flying around the world, with still more in construction today.

=== Books ===
- Light Airplane Design 1963.

Used as a text in several universities.. A popular book on light airplane design. The reasoning behind each feature of these airplanes.

- Landing Gear Design for Light Aircraft 1957).

Arrangement of Landing Gear, Ground Loop, Tires. Wheels, Brakes, Wheels and Brakes without TSO, Brake Systems, Loads and Deflections. Main Gears. Nose Gears. Tail Gears.

- PL-8 Main Gear Design And Trade Offs

Trade-offs in shock absorber design of a nose wheeled aircraft. Geometry, horizontal tail loads at rotation, elevator angle required for rotation, tires selection, FAR 23 design loads, shock absorber stroke, approximate sizing of main gear fiberglass spring.

- Light Airplane Construction

For the homebuilder – for the construction of almost any airplane. Drawing dimensioning. Tools required to build a sheet metal airplane. Riveting inspection. Forming of ribs, frames and skins. Structural assemblies. Assembly jigs.

- PL-4A Construction Manual Sheet metal aircraft

How to make ribs, frames, fittings, form blocks, jigs. Construction tips. Forming of parts. Assemblies. “Pop riveting’ techniques. Fitting and drilling of Plexiglass. VW engine assembly instructions, parts list, installation photo, etc.

- PL-4A Exploded Views

Depicts one major assembly. All part numbers are shown. The builder can easily visualize each and all finished parts and how they go together in the assembly.

=== Pazmany Efficiency Contest ===
Pazmany created and conducted the first real world evaluation of homebuilt aircraft for the EAA, Oshkosh, Wisconsin, 1970. It is still used as the standard for high quality homebuilding. While a great many people had searched for years to find some standard of airplane performance it was Pazmany, with his scrupulous attention to detail, combined with his aeronautical appreciation of flight data that made the breakthrough. Paz created and for several years conducted the Pazmany Efficiency Contest at Oshkosh – which gave EAAers one of their first real world evaluations of homebuilt performance

Now designers, engineers, pilots and companies could address how a plane could be improved, where technique came into play, where an aircraft stood in comparison to its peers, and what are the basic performance factors that allow for results. This was especially important in trying to compare different types of aircraft – Cubs, TaylorCrafts, and Sidewinders – with the low-speed performance of the airplane-aviator combination factor as a key to the overall efficiency coefficient. And at low, minimum speed, different type of aircraft could be compared, and evaluations also made within the design concept of an aircraft by its engineers.

=== EAA Hall Of Fame ===
On Friday evening October 31, 1997 induction ceremonies were held at the EAA aviation center in the dramatic setting of Eagle Hangar of the Aerospace Museum with the inductees, their guests, and officers and directors with Paul Poberezny presiding – and honoring Ladislao Pazmany, who was present, into the Homebuilder's Hall of Fame, at Oshkosh, Wisconsin. The award is based on exemplary contributions to the history, growth, and development of aviation, and is accompanied by a trophy and inscription in the Hall Of Fame display.

=== Digital Age ===
Helped by friends and family, the Pazmany Aircraft Corporation opened an extensive multi-page website in 1999 complete with photos, descriptions, specifications, downloadable articles, videos, and technical support through e-mails, and aeronautical information through PDFs and e-books.

=== Retirement ===
In the summer of 1999 an ailing Ladislao Pazmany would travel to Oshkosh for the last time to attend the AirVenture, as it has now been called. Pazmany spoke to guests both formally in presentation and informally around the first showing of the now completed Pazmany PL-9 Stork, a plane that would have over hundred plan requests within its first years of availability. Partially incapacitated by Parkinson's disease, Pazmany, while infirmed, retained much of his acute intelligence, strong will, humor and appreciation of life, commenting, shortly before his death, and ignoring his adversities, "life has many good things".

=== Awards ===
- Dr. August Raspet Award for Outstanding Contribution to Light Aircraft Design 1970
- EAA Award: Outstanding contribution to aerospace engineering and light airplane design 1970 1972
- AIAA Achievement Award. Outstanding Contribution to Aerospace Engineering 1984
- EAA Homebuilder's Hall of Fame, at Osh Kosh, Wisconsin. 1997
- Smithsonian National Air and Space Museum Wall of Honor 2014

=== Legacy ===
The Pazmany signature was used for over a half century in magazine articles, plans, books, in product PDFs and online in the website as a mark of professionalism.

When Pazmany received an AIAA award for Outstanding Technical Achievement in Aerospace Engineering in 1984, he was featured in Achiever magazine as a “man who has pursued for over four decades, aircraft designs of perfection.” He described his ambition as akin to a classic symphony: “the ultimate flight efficiencies blended with many components into a single machine.”

This vision is reflected in the planes, plans, and books that continue to guide and inspire young designers, engineers, pilots, and educators. As stated by the EAA at the time of his death, “His work and reputation as an aeronautical engineer stretched across continents and touched people at every level of aviation, from government officials to young amateur pilots.“
