= Slepcev Storch =

STOL aircraft

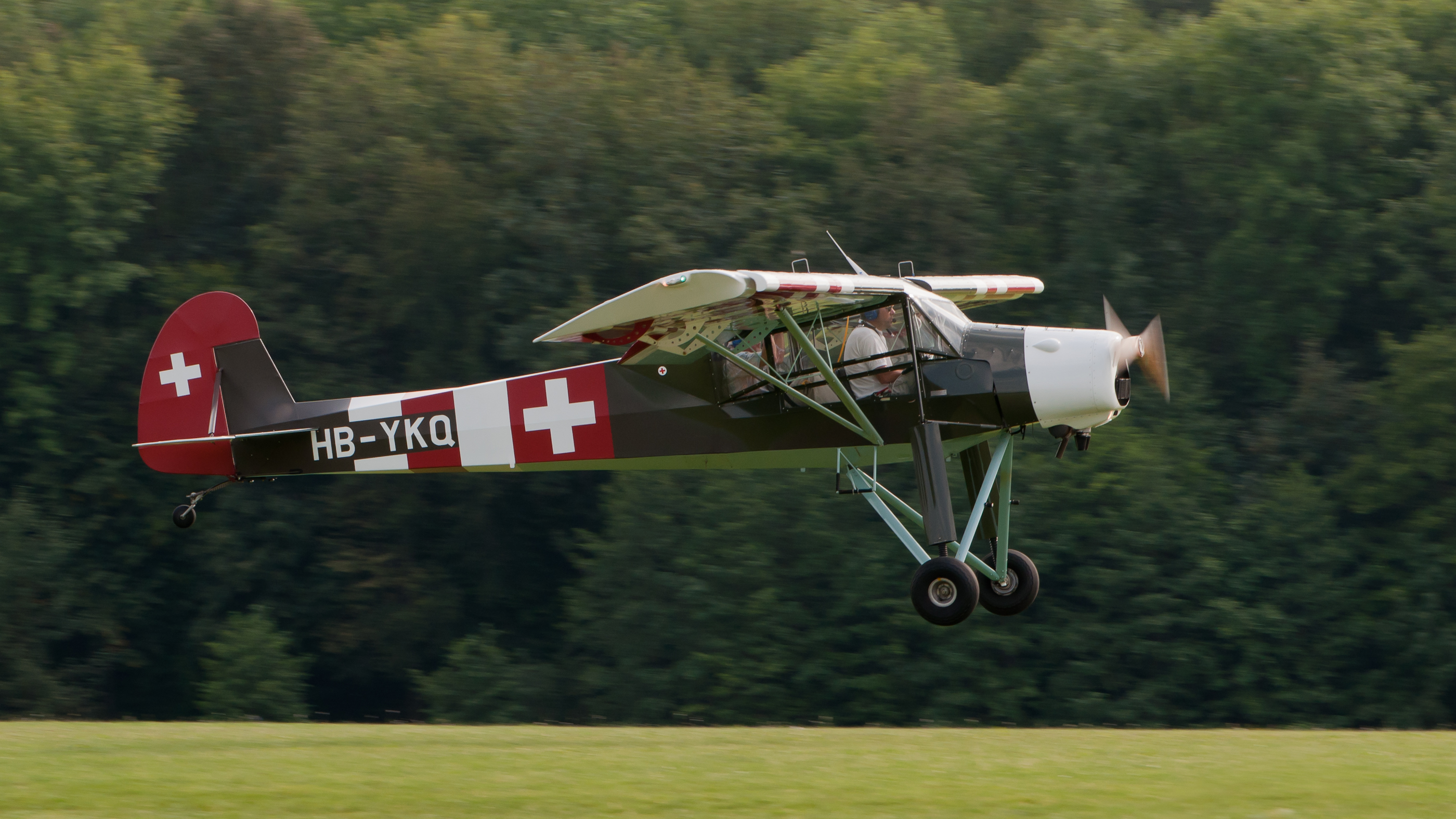
- Slepcev Storch registered in Switzerland

General information
- Type: Type-certified, kit and ultralight STOL aircraft
- National origin: Australia, Serbia
- Manufacturer: Slepcev Aircraft Industry; Storch Aviation Australia; Storch Aircraft Serbia
- Designer: Nestor Slepcev
- Status: In production (2015)

History
- First flight: 1994
- Developed from: Fieseler Fi 156 Storch

The Slepcev Storch (English: Stork) is a Serbian type-certified, kit and ultralight STOL aircraft, designed by Yugoslavian-Australian Nestor Slepcev and currently produced by Storch Aircraft Serbia in several different versions. The ultralight version is a 3/4 scale replica of the Fieseler Fi 156 Storch of the Second World War and is supplied as a kit for amateur construction or as a complete ready-to-fly-aircraft.

== Design and development ==
The aircraft was first flown in 1994. It was originally manufactured by Slepcev's company, Slepcev Aircraft Industry of Beechwood, New South Wales, Australia. The company was later renamed Storch Aviation Australia. The aircraft was type-certified in 1999 to the Joint Airworthiness Requirements - Very Light Aircraft (JAR-VLA) standard, with contributions from aeronautical engineer C. W. "Bill" Whitney. Production then moved to Serbia where a Fédération Aéronautique Internationale microlight category model was developed.

Like the original Fi 156, the Slepcev Storch features a strut-braced high-wing, a two-seats-in-tandem enclosed cockpit, with extensive glazing, fixed conventional landing gear and a single engine in tractor configuration. It is made from welded steel tubing with its flying surfaces fashioned from sheet aluminium and covered in doped aircraft fabric. The ultralight version has a 10 m (32.8 ft) span wing with an area of 15 m^{2} (160 sq ft), large flaps and leading edge slots. The wings are supported by V-struts and jury struts. Engines fitted vary by model.

== Operational history ==
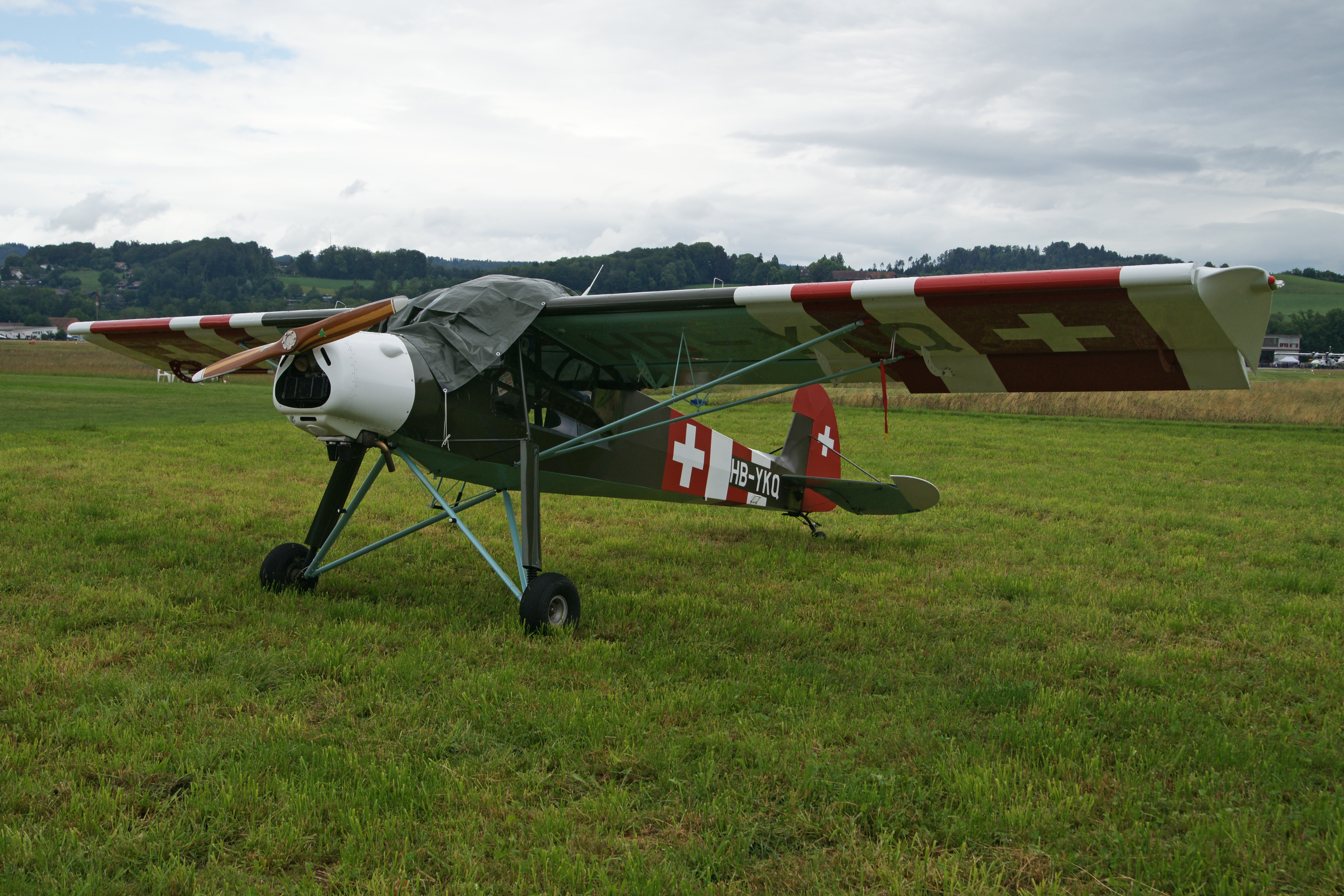
Slepcev Storch

The designer has a keen interest in Second World War history and wanted to use an example of his Storch design to re-enact the 12 September 1943 rescue of Benito Mussolini by Otto Skorzeny and his SS commandos from his imprisonment by Italian Carabinieri guards on the Gran Sasso mountain. It took Slepcev a year to gain Italian approvals for the flight and on 24 August 1996, he landed a Storch Mk 4 at the site, 53 years after the original dramatic rescue had taken place.

== Variants ==
Storch/Storch Mk 4
Homebuilt kit version, powered by a 100 hp (75 kW) Rotax 912ULS or 115 hp (86 kW) Rotax 914, with a gross weight of 500 kg (1,102 lb). Certification includes Australian and Spanish JAR-VLA. Available as a kit or as ready-to-fly.
Storch Microlight
FAI compliant microlight 3/4 sized version, powered by a 100 hp (75 kW) Rotax 912ULS, with a gross weight of 450 kg (992 lb). Available as a kit or as ready-to-fly.
Super Storch
Full scale homebuilt kit version, powered by a 180 hp (134 kW) Lycoming O-360, with a gross weight of 862 kg (1,900 lb). Available as a kit only.
Storch Moose
Full scale homebuilt kit version, powered by a 360 hp (268 kW) Vedeneyev M14P, with a gross weight of 1,500 kg (3,307 lb). Available as a kit only.

== Specifications (Microlight) ==
Data from Bayerl and Tacke

General characteristics

- Crew: one
- Capacity: one passenger
- Wingspan: 10 m (32 ft 10 in)
- Wing area: 15 m^{2} (160 sq ft)
- Empty weight: 250 kg (551 lb)
- Max takeoff weight: 500 kg (1,102 lb)
- Fuel capacity: 40 litres (8.8 imp gal; 11 US gal)
- Powerplant: 1 × Rotax 912ULS four cylinder, liquid and air-cooled, four stroke aircraft engine, 75 kW (101 hp)

Performance

- Maximum speed: 150 km/h (93 mph, 81 kn)
- Cruise speed: 133 km/h (83 mph, 72 kn)
- Stall speed: 40 km/h (25 mph, 22 kn)
- Rate of climb: 6 m/s (1,200 ft/min)

== See also ==
Aircraft of comparable role, configuration, and era

- Carlson Criquet a ¾ scale variant for homebuilders
- Pazmany PL-9 Stork a ¾ scale variant for homebuilders
- RagWing RW19 Stork a ¾ scale variant for homebuilders
