= Pazmany PL-9 Stork =

American single-engined high-wing monoplane

PL-9 Stork

General information
- Type: Single-engined homebuilt monoplane
- National origin: United States
- Manufacturer: Pazmany Aircraft Corporation
- Designer: Ladislao Pazmany
- Status: Plans available (2015)

The Pazmany PL-9 Stork is an American single-engined high-wing monoplane designed by Ladislao Pazmany as a ¾ scale variant of the Second World War Fieseler Storch for the home builder market.

== Design and development ==
The PL-9 Stork features a strut-braced high-wing, a two-seats-in-tandem enclosed cockpit, fixed conventional landing gear, and a single engine in tractor configuration.

The aircraft fuselage is made from welded steel tubing, while the wings are constructed from aluminum sheet. Its 10.97 m (36.0 ft) span wing has an area of 15.44 m^{2} (166.2 sq ft) and mounts flaps. The standard engine used is the 150 to 160 hp (112 to 119 kW) Lycoming O-320 four-stroke powerplant.

== Specifications ==
Data from Taylor

General characteristics

- Crew: Tandem
- Capacity: 2
- Length: 23 ft 3.5 in (7.4 m)
- Wingspan: 36 ft 0 in (10.97 m)
- Empty weight: 1,132 lb (513 kg)
- Gross weight: 1,673 lb (759 kg)
- Powerplant: 1 × Lycoming O-320 , 150 hp (112 kW)

Performance

- Maximum speed: 116 mph (187 km/h, 101 kn)
- Cruise speed: 95 mph (153 km/h, 83 kn)
- Range: 332 mi (534 km, 289 nmi)
- Rate of climb: 1,400 ft/min (7.1 m/s)

== See also ==
Aircraft of comparable role, configuration, and era

- Carlson Criquet
- Criquet Storch
- RagWing RW19 Stork
- Slepcev Storch
