= Little Wing Autogyro =

American autogyro

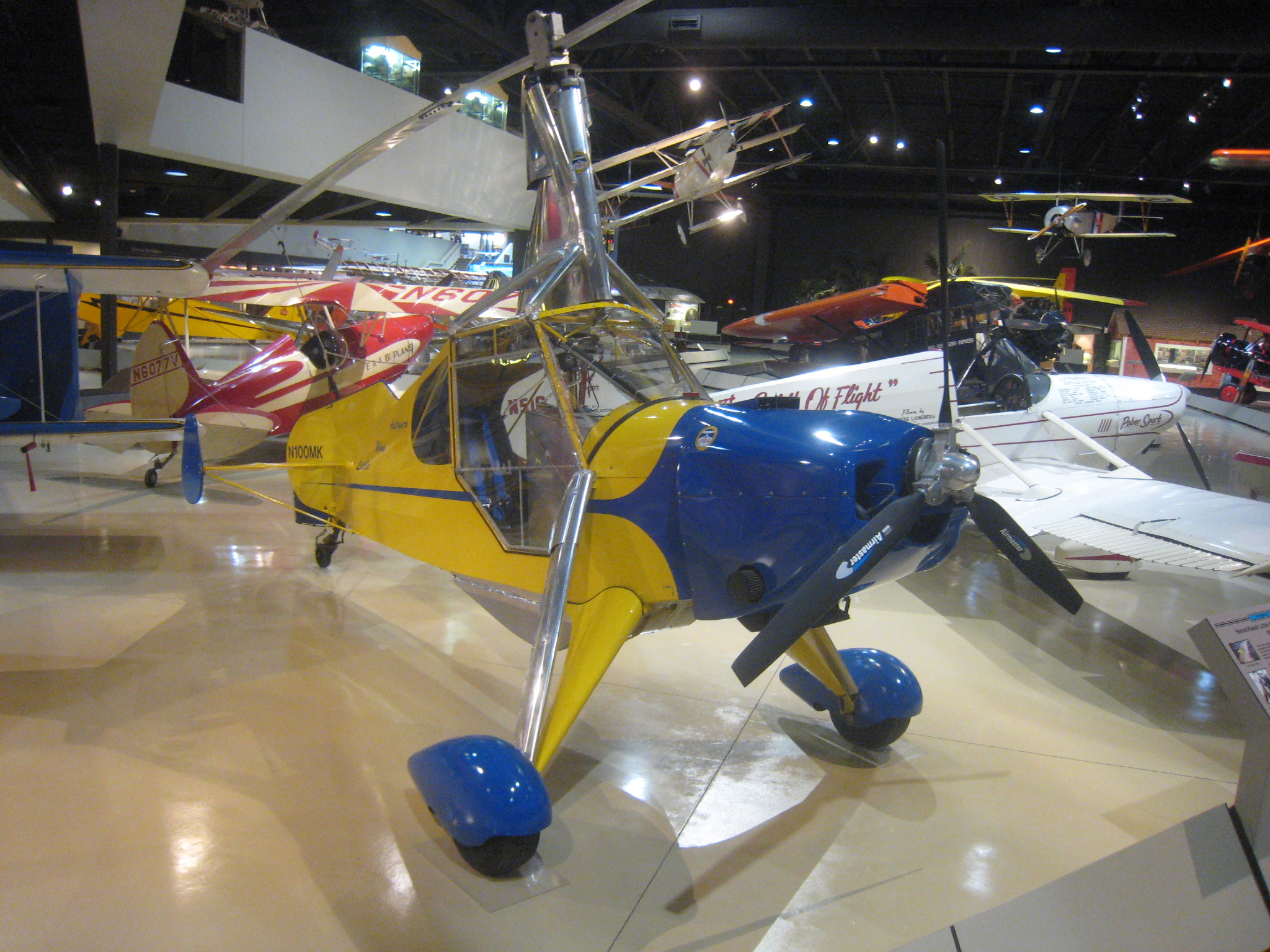

General information
- Type: Autogyro
- National origin: United States
- Manufacturer: Little Wing Autogyros, Inc.
- Designer: Ron Herron

History
- Introduction date: 1995
- First flight: 1995

The Little Wing Autogyro is a series of conventional one and two place autogyros with a tractor engine layout using modern engines and produced by Little Wing Autogyros, Inc. of Mayflower, Arkansas.

== Development ==
Ron Herron was concerned about the problem of pushover fatalities in pusher gyrocopters. He set to develop a tractor layout gyrocopter that also met the FAA rules for ultralight aircraft. A Prototype LW-1 powered by a Continental O-200 engine was soon followed on by the LW-2. The design was influenced by Juan de la Cierva's autogyros.

== Operational history ==
Andy Keech set 29 world records in an LW-5 Autogyro.

== Variants ==
LW-1
Original proof of concept prototype
LW-2
Single place autogyro designed to weigh less than 254 lb (115 kg) to meet US FAR 103 Ultralight Vehicles regulations
LW-3
A 70 hp (52 kW) covered version
LW-4
A two place long frame version
LW-5
A two place short frame version
Roto-Pup
Ultralight version based on the Preceptor Ultra Pup airframe.

== Aircraft on display ==
- Little Wing LW-5, EAA Airventure Museum in Oshkosh, Wisconsin.

== Specifications (LW-2) ==
Data from Company

General characteristics

- Crew: 1
- Length: 18 ft (5.5 m)
- Height: 8 ft 5 in (2.57 m)
- Gross weight: 750 lb (340 kg)
- Fuel capacity: 8.5 U.S. gallons (32 L; 7.1 imp gal)
- Main rotor diameter: 23 ft (7.0 m)
- Main rotor area: 415 sq ft (38.6 m^{2})
- Propellers: 2-bladed

Performance

- Cruise speed: 65 kn (75 mph, 121 km/h)
- Disk loading: 1.8 lb/sq ft (8.8 kg/m^{2})

== See also ==
Aircraft of comparable role, configuration, and era

- Cierva C.1
- Cierva C.2
- Cierva C.3
