= Viking Aircraft =

Viking Aircraft may refer to:

== Companies ==
- Viking Air, an aircraft manufacturer based in North Saanich, British Columbia, Canada
- Viking Aircraft Inc. a defunct aircraft manufacturer (2000-2005) that was based in Panama City Beach, Florida, United States
- Viking Aircraft LLC, an aircraft manufacturer based in Elkhorn, Wisconsin, United States
- Viking Airlines AB, a defunct privately owned charter airline based in Stockholm, Sweden
- FlyViking AS; a defunct Norwegian airline

== Aircraft ==
- Lockheed S-3 Viking, an American anti-submarine warfare aircraft
- St Andrews Viking, a family of American powered parachutes
- Vickers VC.1 Viking, a British WWII airliner
- Vickers Viking, a British WWI amphibious aircraft

== See also ==
- Viking (disambiguation)
- Viking Aircraft Viking-series
  - Viking Aircraft Viking I
  - Viking Aircraft Viking II
