= Church V-8 =

Motor engine

V8
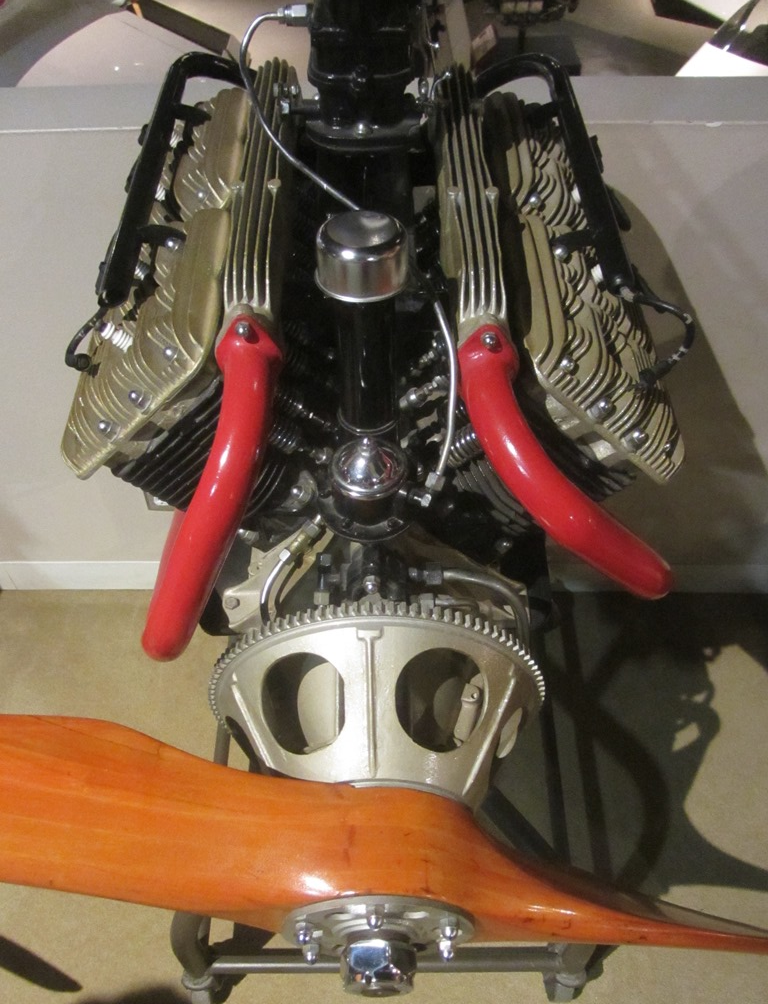
- Church V8 on display
- Type: V8 piston engine
- National origin: USA
- Manufacturer: Church Aircraft Manufacturing Company of Chicago
- Designer: Jim Church
- Major applications: Light Aircraft
- Developed from: 1940-1941

The Church V-8 is a V-8 4-stroke aircraft engine developed from the Ford flathead V8 engine in the United States in the late 1930s.

== Design and development ==
The 90 degree V8 with downdraft carburetors was certified under Aircraft Type Certificate No. 224 on 10 October 1939 after 150hrs of testing. The engine was developed in 1939 as a lightweight air-cooled variant of the side-valve Ford engine for aircraft using the Ford crankshaft, connecting rods and pistons.

== Operational history ==
A low wing retractable gear side-by-side aircraft likened to a little Seversky, (alluding to the Seversky monoplanes such as the P-35 making headway on the US racing circuit), was developed to use the engine. Church's wartime enlistment into the Navy flying Corsairs diverted development and production ceased in 1942. The prototype engine was then used on an ice-boat, which sank to the bottom of a lake after breaking through ice. The engine was recovered and later restored for display in 1973 by Continental Motors, Inc. and the EAA Museum.

== Applications ==
Arrow Sport
low wing monoplane
Church low wing
A purpose designed racer to be powered by the Church V-8.

== Engines on display ==
- EAA Airventure Museum

== Specifications (Church V-8) ==
Data from Vintage Airplane December 1974

=== General characteristics ===
- Type: V-8
- Bore: 3.25 in (83 mm)
- Stroke: 3.75 in (95 mm)
- Displacement: 248 cu in (4.06 L)
- Dry weight: 342 lb (155.13 kg) includes exhaust manifold, generator and fuel pump

=== Components ===
- Valvetrain: Side-valve operated by pushrods
- Fuel type: 73 octane
- Oil system: pressure feed
- Cooling system: air-cooled

=== Performance ===
- Power output: 93 hp (69 kW) @ 2900rpm
- Compression ratio: 5.7 to 1
- Specific fuel consumption: 73 octane

== See also ==
- Church Marathon J-3 Engine
- Church Midwing JC-1
