= George Wahl Bogardus =

American aviator

- George Bogardus and Little Gee Bee at Deer Park Airport, Long Island, NY circa 1947
- Born: September 20, 1914; Cascade Locks, Oregon, U.S.
- Died: September 14, 1997 (aged 82); Gresham, Oregon, U.S.
- Occupation: Aviator
- Known for: Founding the American Airmen's Association (AAA)

George W. Bogardus (September 20, 1914 – September 14, 1997) was an American aviator and co-founder of the American Airmen's Association (AAA), an organization dedicated to enthusiasts of amateur-built airplanes. After World War II, Bogardus collaborated with the federal government to advocate for the recognition and registration of amateur-built aircraft.

Bogardus was born in Cascade Locks, Oregon. He flew a homebuilt airplane, named Little Gee Bee, from Beaverton, Oregon to Washington D.C., on three occasions to demonstrate the capabilities of such aircraft. He died in Gresham, Oregon.

The organization Bogardus co-founded, the AAA, was a forerunner to the Experimental Aviation Association (EAA), which has more than 300,000 members and 1,000 chapters worldwide. Bogardus's efforts with the Civil Aeronautics Board (CAB) helped ensure the legality of home-built aircraft in the United States, subject to inspection, registration, and airworthiness certification requirements. They are registered as a subcategory of experimental designs, hence the namesake of Experimental Amateur Built (EAB).

== Background ==
Following the Wright brothers' first flights, aviation and machine technology evolved rapidly, particularly during WW1. Charles Lindbergh's successful nonstop flight across the Atlantic Ocean in 1927 inspired and accelerated development in many aviation branches. By 1930, the basic aerodynamic and construction concepts were firmly defined, and aircraft parts became more affordable, making building a viable aircraft within reach of hobbyists. Magazines such as Modern Mechanix and Popular Aviation offered a platform for home builders to exchange ideas.

In the late 1920s, several well-known American home built airplanes were designed, including the Heath Parasol, the Corben Baby Ace, and the Pietenpol Air Camper. Plans or kits were made available to builders via mail order. They used wood truss construction, similar to pre-WWI aircraft, or simple welded tubing. Motor options were limited but included the motorcycle and the Ford Model A engine. These were affordable materials and techniques that appealed to home builders; however, all forms of aviation were adversely affected during the Great Depression.

Oregon was an early center for home built aviation development. Until the late 1930s, Oregon was one of few states with state-level aircraft licensing. This preceded federal level certification and registration. Home building flourished under the state's progressive statutes. Home building was allowed under the Federal Air Commerce Act of 1926. However, federal rules were revised by the Civil Aeronautics Act of 1938, which created the CAA (now FAA). The new rules failed to include amateur-built airplanes. By the late 1930s, home builders felt the federal government had ignored them, and also felt that CAA enforcement was encroaching on their personal freedoms.

Leslie (Les) Long of Cornelius, Oregon was one of the most prolific Oregon home builders in the 1930s and 1940s. Les designed and built several aircraft, including the Long Low-Wing Longster – a low-wing, wire-braced design. He designed, built, and published plans for a two-cylinder aircraft engine, the Harlequin (which used Harley Davidson motorcycle engine cylinders), and he hand carved wood propellers. Les wrote multiple articles for Popular Aviation about his experiments and helped launch a national organization called the Amateur Aircraft League. He mentored several builders, including Ed Ball, Swede Ralston (the founders of Aero Air at the Hillsborough Airport), and Tom Story.

== Founding of the American Airmen's Association ==
In about 1930, Bogardus met Les Long, Roy Fry, and Lee Eyerly. Eyerly was a member of the Oregon State Board of Aeronautics. Together, they formed the American Airmen's Association (AAA), offering memberships on a subscription-based model. Long and Bogardus collaborated on the initial newsletter called the Triple A Flyer. Later, Bogardus renamed the newsletter to the Popular Flying Manual and grew the AAA into a national organization (he also maintained a subgroup known as the Oregon Airmen's Association). Les died in 1945. Bogardus continued to build the subscription base and use his experience with linotype machines to produce the newsletter.

== Construction of Little Gee Bee ==
The first incarnation of Les Long's low wing design was built in 1937 by Les and Swede Ralston. It used an Aeronca "L head" (E-107) engine. It became known as Wimpy. The airplane was ultimately owned by Myron "Buzz" Buzzwell. Bogardus and others improved upon the design, e.g. they added a Continental A40, and a NACA 23012 airfoil. A second airframe was built by Tom Story and Lee Eyerly, at Eyerly Aircraft, about 1940. It was purchased by Bogardus in 1945 and it came to be known as Little Gee Bee. In 1947 Bogardus and A&P mechanic Cliff Krum installed an additional fuel tank and a Continental A65 for the flights to Washington D.C. Fred Sheppard furnished a fuel filler neck and the gas cap from Tex Rankin's wrecked Republic Seabee. Little Gee Bee was based at Bernard's Airfield in Beaverton, Oregon.

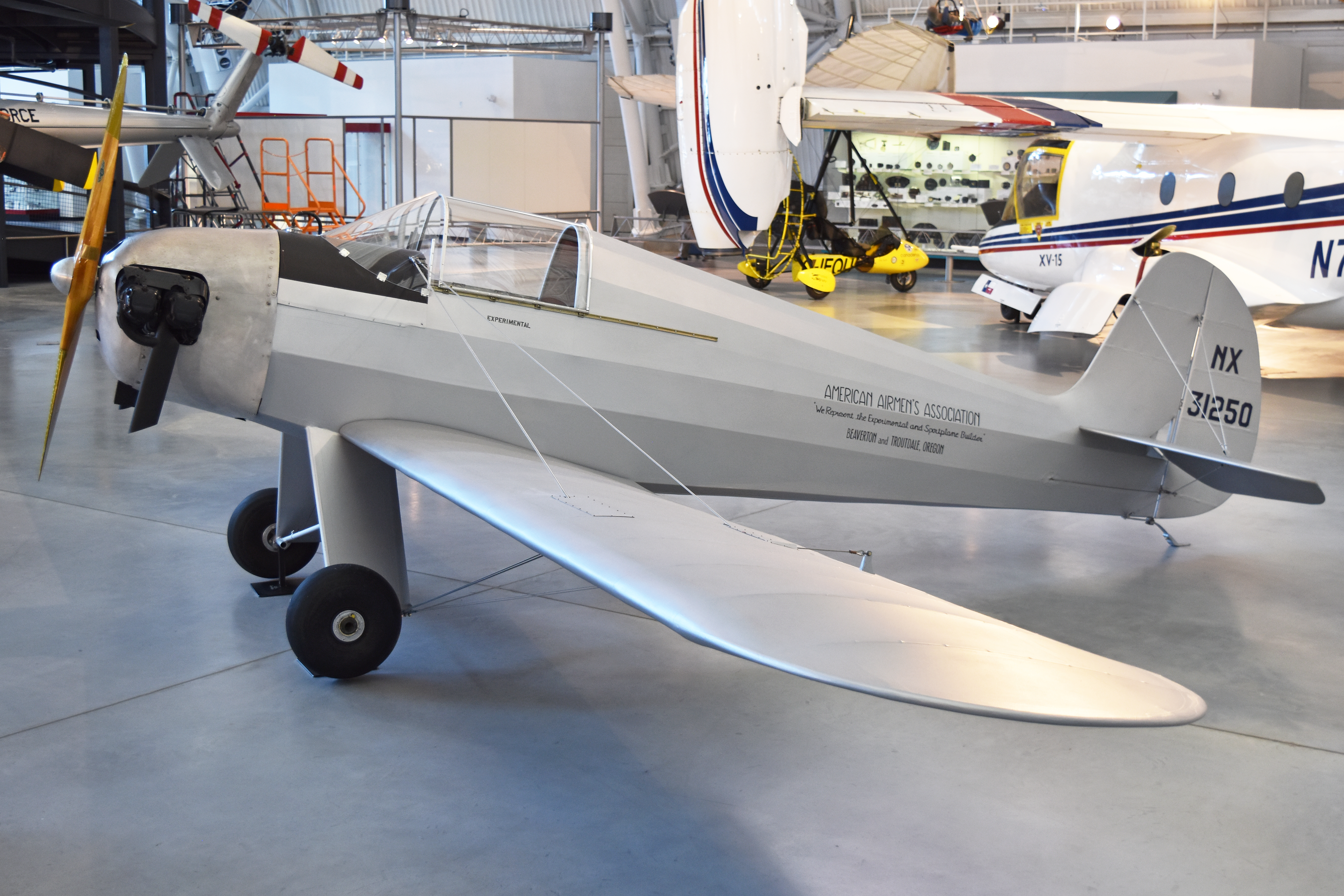
Little Gee Bee at the National Air and Space Museum

== Trip to Washington to promote home-built aircraft ==
Beaverton had been an active center for home builders since the late 1930s. Several homebuilders learned to fly there with designer and flight instructor George Yates. Bogardus left Oregon to work in California from 1937 to 1942, eventually working at the Ryan School of Aeronautics in Hemet California. He stayed in contact with and recruited some of the "Beaverton boys" to work in Hemet. In 1942 he returned to Oregon, worked at Yates' Geodetic Aircraft in Beaverton, and with Les Long building propellers. For the time being, WW2 took precedence over fighting back against CAA limitations on home-built aircraft.

For the majority of WW2 general aviation activities were suspended . Bogardus and Les Long continued to correspond about the CAA situation during the war. Immediately after the war, Bogardus contacted the Civil Aeronautics Board (CAB) and made the case for home builders. He was surprised when they invited him to make his arguments in person in Washington D.C. In April 1946 Roy Fry and Bogardus drove to Washington, stopping to visit various AAA members along the way. They spent a month on the road, driving a 1937 Chevy. Several AAA members helped with expenses, provided room and board, or made suggestions for the CAB meeting.

The CAB meeting took place at a fortuitous moment in history, as acknowledged by Bogardus himself. The CAB, and the aviation industry at large, expected a post war boom in civilian aviation. The CAB was open minded and quickly agreed to recognize home-built aircraft. The meeting was brief but included notables John H. Geisse and Albert Vollmecke. The CAB responded in October 1946, six months after the first meeting. Home-built aircraft were added to the already existing experimental category with certain limitations. Up to this point, the experimental category had mostly been used by aircraft developers for prototyping and testing new designs. The CAB stipulated that the newly recognized home-built aircraft must be inspected by a CAA inspector, registered, and be marked with an "EXPERIMENTAL" placard near the cockpit. Because of a discrepancy that needed to be addressed, Little Gee Bee was not the first, but instead the second home built to receive its NX registration. The first homebuilt aircraft to be registered was Russ Stewart's Salmson powered Pietenpol. Little Gee Bee was registered NX 31250.

Flights to Washington D.C. that followed the initial CAB meeting took place in 1947, 1948 and 1951. They were needed to expand the definition of the EAB category in order to better accommodate home builders, e.g. to increase the registration period. Kit plane requirements and certification were defined at this time. In the meantime, Bogardus used the AAA newsletter to encourage members to comply with the new Federal rules. An important Bogardus confidant and AAA member was Jack McRae, an aeronautical engineer based in Long Island, New York. Jack had engineering credentials and he aspired to design his own home-built aircraft. He eventually built the Super Dart, based on the Driggs Dart. Jack accompanied Bogardus to Washington D.C. in 1947, flying his Cessna 140, and helped to explain the technical aspects of home built designs. He hosted Bogardus at his home in Long Island, NY and coordinated press coverage.

In a 1986 interview with Robert Taylor, Bogardus acknowledged that many individuals helped make the flights to Washington D.C. happen, including Charlie Bernard, owner of Bernard field in Beaverton, A&P mechanic Walt Ruppert, and many AAA members across the country.

== End of the AAA ==
By the early 1950s the AAA had served its purpose. In 1953 a new organization formed in Wisconsin – the EAA. Its goal was to promote the now legal activity of building personal aircraft. According to Dick VanGrunsven, Bogardus was reluctant to give up on the organization that he had put so much of his life into (communication with author, December 28, 2024). Bogardus' contributions were recognized by the EAA. He was one of the first three names added to the EAA Hall of Fame in 1993.

== Death and legacy ==
Bogardus and his wife Lillian had no children and left their estate to EAA Chapter 105, which is currently in Hillsboro, Oregon in the care of Dick VanGrunsven. Their estate contained a large collection of documents, including correspondence with State and Federal agencies, scrap books, early AAA newsletters, twenty years' worth of correspondence with AAA members (many of whom became lifelong friends), a series of letters from Les Long written in 1943–44, and what remained of Little Gee Bee including its airframe and engine logbooks. As of 2025, EAA Chapter 105 is in the process of digitizing and hosting some of the documents.

Little Gee Bee was restored to non-flying condition in 2005 by EAA Chapter 105 members and was donated to the National Air and Space Museum of the Smithsonian Institution. Wimpy, the first Les Long low wing, was restored to non-flying condition by the Oregon Aviation Historical Society (OAHS). Wimpy and two of Tom Story's airplanes reside in the OAHS museum located in Cottage Grove, Oregon.
