= Solution =

Solution may refer to:

- Solution (chemistry), a mixture where one substance is dissolved in another
- Solution (equation), in mathematics
  - Numerical solution, in numerical analysis, approximate solutions within specified error bounds
- Solution, in problem solving
- A business solution is a method of organizing people and resources that can be sold as a product
  - Solution, in solution selling

== Other uses ==
- V-STOL Solution, an ultralight aircraft
- Solution (band), a Dutch rock band
  - Solution (Solution album), 1971
- Solution A.D., an American rock band
- Solution (Cui Jian album), 1991
- Solutions (album), a 2019 album by K.Flay

== See also ==
- Nature-based solutions
- The Solution (disambiguation)
