= Tiger moth =

Tiger moth may refer to:

== Biology ==
- Tiger moths, certain moths of the subfamily Arctiinae
  - Arctiini, a tribe of tiger moths in the moth family Erebidae

== Aircraft ==
- de Havilland Tiger Moth, an aerobatic and trainer tailwheel biplane
- de Havilland DH.71 Tiger Moth, an earlier monoplane produced by de Havilland
- Fisher R-80 Tiger Moth, a homebuilt aircraft
- RagWing RW22 Tiger Moth, a homebuilt aircraft

== Fiction ==
- Tiger Moth, a supervillainess from "The Resurrection of Ra's al Ghul" by DC Comics
