= Long Anzani Longster =

Anzani Longster

General information
- Type: Homebuilt aircraft
- Designer: Leslie Long

History
- Introduction date: 1930

The Long Anzani Longster AL-1 is an early homebuilt aircraft.

== Design and development ==
The Anzani Longster was the second in the series of nine homebuilt designs from Leslie Long. The design was published in the 1931 issue of 'Modern Mechanix and Inventions'.

The Longster is a conventional landing gear-equipped, single engine, mid-wing aircraft with lower wing struts. The rudder is balanced without a fixed vertical stabilizer.

== Operational history ==
One replica of the Longster has been built from the original plans by students at Lane Community College for display in the Oregon Aviation Museum.

== Variants ==
Anzani Longster
Heath Longster
A wire braced parasol modification with a Heath modified Henderson motorcycle engine.
Ultralight Longster
A modern replica of the Longster with various engine installations.

== Specifications (Anzani Longster) ==
Data from EAA, 1931 flying and gliding manual

General characteristics

- Length: 18 ft 3 in (5.56 m)
- Wingspan: 27 ft (8.2 m)
- Height: 5 ft 1 in (1.55 m)
- Empty weight: 425 lb (193 kg)
- Powerplant: 1 × Anzani 3-cyl. Y radial engine, 35 hp (26 kW)
- Propellers: 2-bladed, 6 ft (1.8 m) diameter

Performance

- Maximum speed: 79 kn (91 mph, 146 km/h)
- Range: 100 nmi (120 mi, 190 km)

== See also ==
Aircraft of comparable role, configuration, and era

- Church Midwing JC-1
