= RW2 =

RW2 may refer to:

- .rw2, a raw image format used in Panasonic cameras
- RagWing RW2 Special I, a family of biplane, single engine homebuilt aircraft
