= Formula 600 =

Single-Seater Racing Class

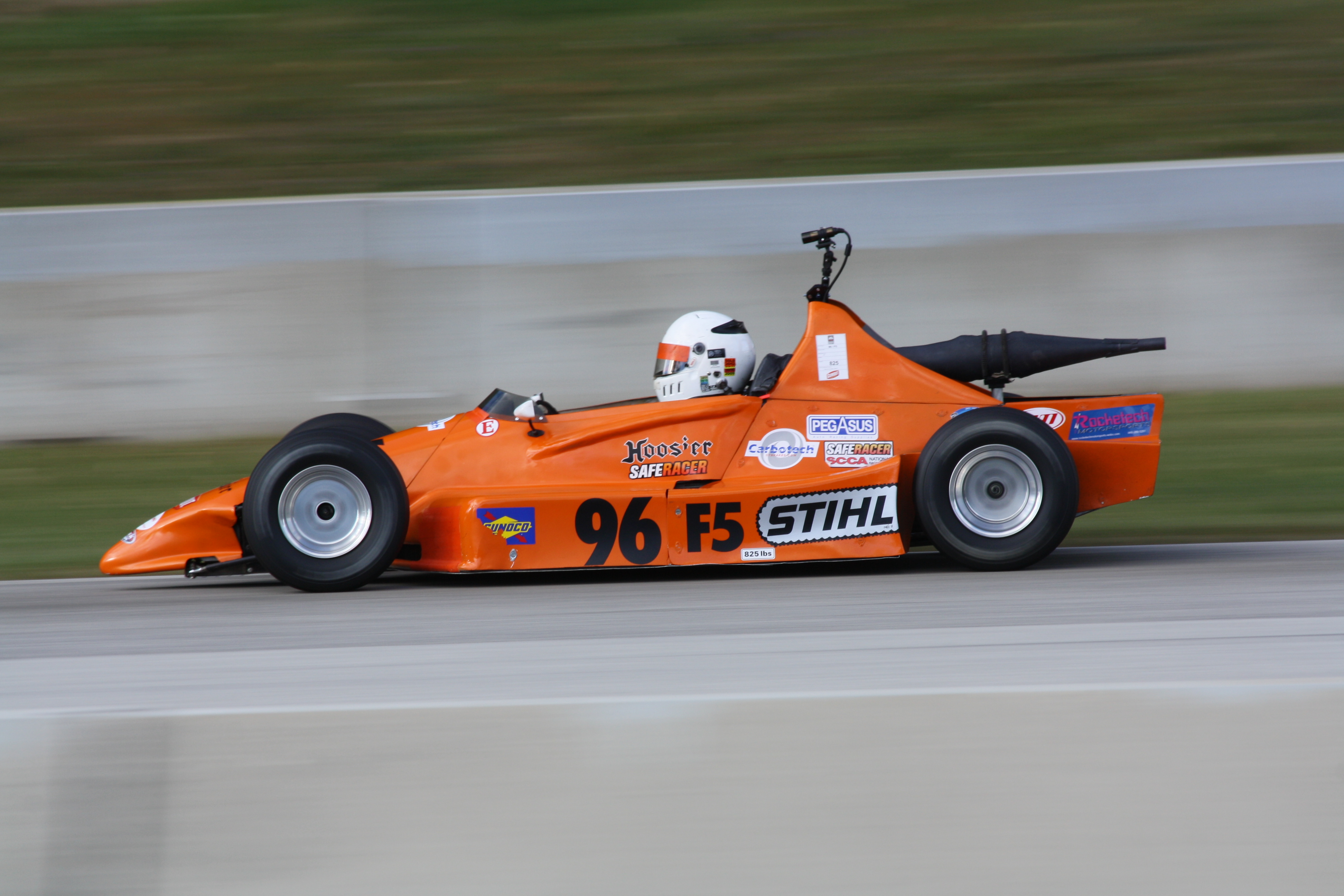
Formula 500 in 2012

Formula 600 (F600) is a Sports Car Club of America (SCCA) and Midwestern Council of Sports Car Clubs (MCSCC) open wheel road racing class.

Formula 600 was originally introduced in the early 1980s as Formula 440 (F440) and continued as Formula 500 (F500) through the 2022 season before being renamed to Formula 600 (F600), and is a closely regulated class. Several chassis manufacturers produce different designs to a tight dimensional ruleset. Engines are specified by the ruleset, and builders are not allowed to modify engine internals. Instead of traditional dampers and springs, F500 cars utilize a very simple elastomeric spring medium contained in a cylindrical canister. The rules state the elastomer must be 2" in diameter by 1" in thickness, but the design and implementation of the elastomeric springs (commonly called "pucks" by the competitors) is wide open. Additionally, each chassis manufacturer produces bodywork of their own design, which adheres to dimensional constraints. These regulations allow for very competitive racing at a relatively low cost, which rewards driver and car set-up skills. In 2023, the class was renamed to Formula 600.

== F600 engines ==
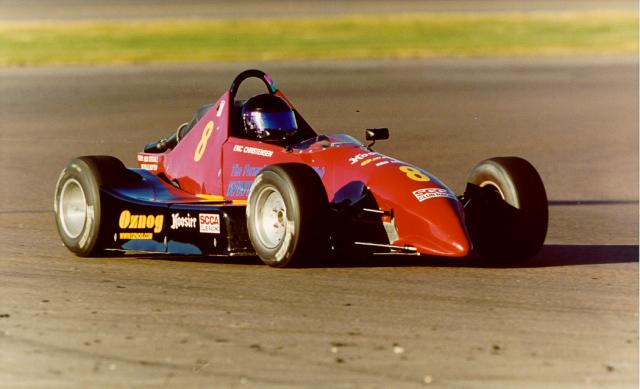
Eric Christensen in a KBS Mk-8 at Phoenix International Raceway, January 1999

Formula 600 cars are powered by a two-cylinder, water-cooled two-stroke engine or a four-cylinder four-stroke 600cc motorcycle engine. Modern cars use either the Rotax 593, or Rotax 593HO originally produced for Ski-Doo snowmobiles. Motorcycle-engined cars use the Honda CBR600RR, the Suzuki GSX-R600, or the Yamaha R6 engine. Older cars, mostly used for vintage and regional road racing or Solo events these days use the Rotax 494, Rotax 493 or Kawasaki 440/A engine. The AMW 500L-85/250-2 R2c engine, while legal for use in Formula 500 racing, is rarely used these days.

The SCCA also now allows the use of 600cc motorcycle engines with a sequential transmission as an alternative to the two-stroke engines. The usage of this engine requires a 28mm intake restrictor and a higher minimum weight of 900 pounds for the car in order to keep performance the same as the two-stroke powered cars. Cars using these engines are often unofficially referred to as Formula 600 cars, although they still race in the same Formula 500 class.

The Kawasaki 440/A engine, produced by Kawasaki, is a 436 cc piston port engine utilizing 38 mm Mikuni VM series carburetors and a tuned dual exhaust. While this engine is no longer competitive in road racing, it is still widely used in Solo II and Autocross events. Like all F500 engines, except for the AMW, the Kawasaki was originally produced as a snowmobile engine. It has been out of production since the early 1980s. Parts for these engines are becoming more difficult to find.

The AMW 500L-85 engine, built by Two Stroke International was introduced to F500 in 1994. It is a 497 cc reed valve engine using twin 38 mm Mikuni SuperBN carburetors. To keep the performance of these larger, more powerful engines in line with prior engines, SCCA mandates the use of a spec Y exhaust manifold and single tuned pipe on the AMW engine. Unlike the other engines used in F600, the AMW engine is a derivative of a light aircraft engine. This engine is no longer in production, and is not supported by the manufacturer.

Introduced for the 1997 season was the Rotax 494 engine. Rotax builds racing and industrial engines for a wide variety of applications, including aircraft, motorcycles, go-karts, snowmobiles and watercraft, The Rotax 494 engine is a 499cc rotary-valve engine. Like the AMW, the Rotax utilizes a 2 into 1 "Y" exhaust manifold and a single tuned expansion chamber exhaust. The Rotax engine utilizes the same 38 mm Mikuni VM carburetors as the Kawasaki. The Rotax engine has become, by far, the most popular engine in F500 road racing. The Rotax 494 went out of production for Ski-Doo following the 2000 model year. Ski-Doo/Rotax ended support for it shortly thereafter. Some parts however, are still available through dealers and online outlets.

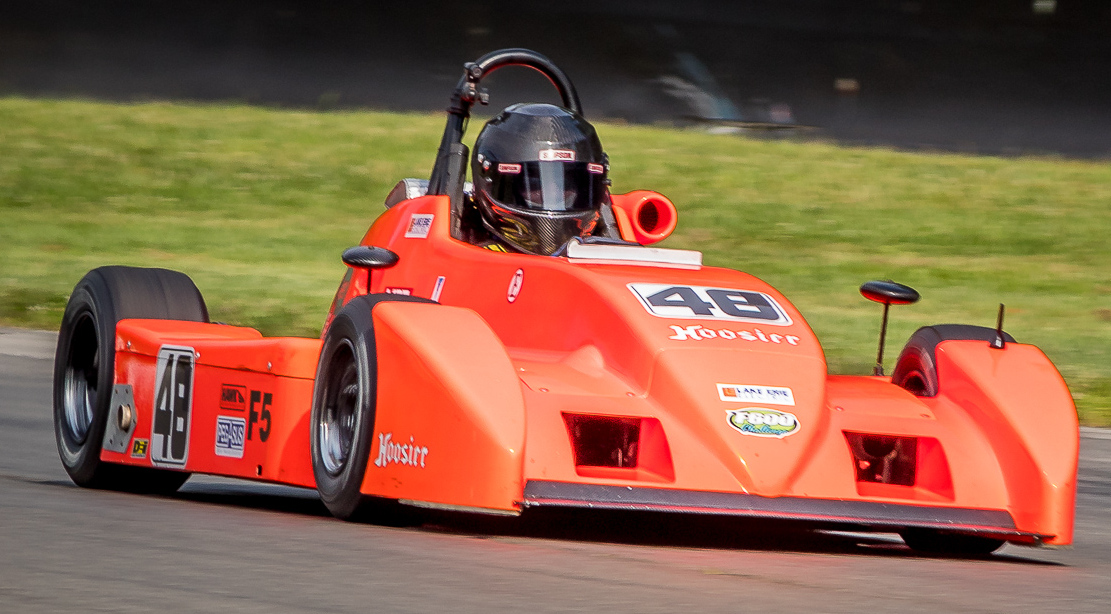

In 2004 SCCA added the Rotax 493 to the list of approved engines. The 493 has the same bore and stroke as the 494. However, unlike the 494, is a reed valve engine. It also runs Mikuni VM series carbs and the "Y" exhaust manifold like its cousin the 494. Cars running the 493 engine are required to run at a higher minimum weight to maintain parity with the older 494 and AMW engines. Like the 494, the 493 also went out of production for Ski-Doo following the 2003 model year. Support for it ended in 2007. As with the 494, some parts are still available through dealers and online outlets.

In 2011 SCCA added the Rotax 593 to the list of approved engines. The 593, (more commonly known as the Ski-Doo 500ss) is a 600cc version of the reed valve 493 engine. It also runs Mikuni VM series carbs and the "Y" exhaust manifold like the other Rotax engines, but are required to run a specified intake restrictor to keep power output on par with the 500cc 493 engine. Cars running the 593 engine are also required to run at a higher minimum weight to maintain parity with the older 494 and AMW engines. The 593 remains in production for Ski-Doo to date, rebadged from "500ss" to "600" in 2010.

In 2021 SCCA allowed the use of the rotax 593HO or high output.

Engine specifications are tightly regulated by the SCCA. No engine modifications are permitted in formula 600. Engines must be run in stock form "as delivered" from the factory. No aftermarket parts, port modifications, or other variations from stock configuration are allowed. This helps keep costs down and means close competition on the track.

== F600 transmission ==
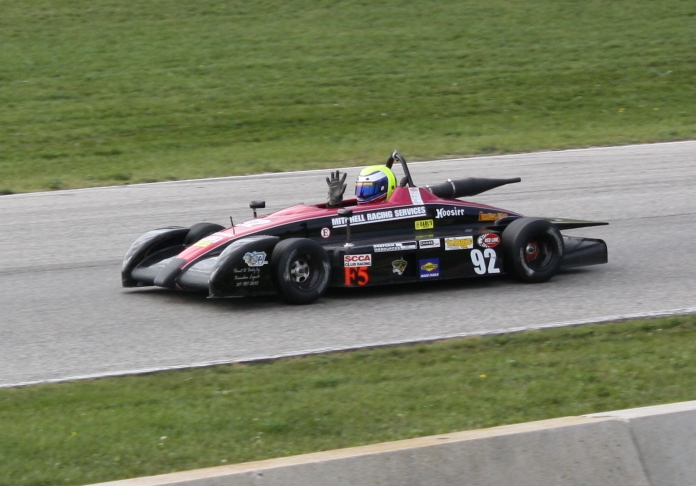
2009 National Runoffs winner

Two-stroke F600 cars use an advanced Continuously Variable Transmission (CVT), similar to that used in snowmobiles.

These simple belt driven automatic transmissions are tuned to optimize the power curve of a two-stroke engine, constantly keeping the engine at its peak power. One of the key benefits of the CVT is that it is a stepless transmission. This allows all of the engine's power to be transmitted to the drive wheels at all times.

Motorcycle-engined cars use the same sequential transmission used in the motorcycle that the engine came from. This is typically operated by paddle shifters attached to the steering column.

== SCCA National Championship Runoffs History ==
The SCCA National Championship Runoffs has crowned Formula 500 National Champions since 1997. The original Formula 440 class competed at the SCCA Runoffs from 1984 - 1996.

Class	Year	Track	Champion	2nd place	3rd place	Pole position
F440	1984	Road Atlanta	Michael Leathers	Danny King	Ray Little	Danny King
F440	1985	Road Atlanta	David W. Elliott	Danny King	Nick D'Amico	David W. Elliott
F440	1986	Road Atlanta	Michael Leathers	David W. Elliott	Brad Hulings	David W. Elliott
F440	1987	Road Atlanta	Michael Leathers	David W. Elliott	Brad Loehner	David W. Elliott
F440	1988	Road Atlanta	Dave Drissel	Brad Loehner	Paul Elliott	Brad Loehner
F440	1989	Road Atlanta	David W. Elliott	Dave Drissel	Michael Leathers	David W. Elliott
F440	1990	Road Atlanta	Paul Elliott	David W. Elliott	Brad Hulings	Wesley Wilfong
F440	1991	Road Atlanta	Paul Elliott	David W. Elliott	Chris Shultz	Paul Elliott
F440	1992	Road Atlanta	Chris Shultz	Mike Brent	Paul Elliott	David W. Elliott
F440	1993	Road Atlanta	Greg Grennan	Paul Elliott	Rusty Cook	David W. Elliott
F440	1994	Mid-Ohio	David W. Elliott	James Martin Elder	Rusty Cook	Aaron Ellis
F440	1995	Mid-Ohio	Ramon Partida	Tim Tibbals	Ron Vince	Andy Lally
F440	1996	Mid-Ohio	Jack Bennett	Wesley Wilfong	Howell C. Jones III	Jim Hale
F500	1997	Mid-Ohio	Mike Brent	Wesley Wilfong	David Lapham	Mike Brent
F500	1998	Mid-Ohio	Ron Vince	David Lapham	Wesley Wilfong	Jeff Auberger
F500	1999	Mid-Ohio	Jeff Auberger	Mike Brent	David Mitsch	Aaron Ellis
F500	2000	Mid-Ohio	Aaron Ellis	Jim Schultz	Rusty Cook	Fred Edwards, Jr.
F500	2001	Mid-Ohio	Elivan Goulart	Jeff Jorgenson	Calvin Stewart	Thomas Edwards
F500	2002	Mid-Ohio	Elivan Goulart	Doug Marsh	Kenny Price	Elivan Goulart
F500	2003	Mid-Ohio	Jonathan Dick	Brian Novak	Rusty Cook	Doug Marsh
F500	2004	Mid-Ohio	Jonathan Dick	Aaron Ellis	Jason Morales	Doug Marsh
F500	2005	Mid-Ohio	Doug Marsh	Wiley McMahan	Mike Brent	Mike Brent
F500	2006	Heartland Park	Bryan Golay	David Cox	Steven Jondal	Jason Knuteson
F500	2007	Heartland Park	Brian Novak	Jason Knuteson	James F. Libecco	Jason Knuteson
F500	2008	Heartland Park	Jason Knuteson	Aaron Ellis	David Lapham	Jason Knuteson
F500	2009	Road America	Jason Knuteson	Patrick Gallagher	Aaron Ellis	Patrick Gallagher
F500	2010	Road America	Patrick Gallagher	Michael Mueller	David Lapham	Jason Knuteson
F500	2011	Road America	Michael Mueller	Jeremy Morales	C.J. McAbee	Michael Mueller
F500	2012	Road America	Michael Mueller	C.J. McAbee	Mike Vacek	Jason Knuteson
F500	2013	Road America	James Weida	Aaron Ellis	Steve Jondal	James Weida
F500	2014	Laguna Seca	Brian Novak	Wiley McMahan	Jeff Jorgenson	Brian Novak
F500	2015	Daytona	Calvin Stewart	Matthew Strand	James Weida	Wiley McMahan
F500	2016	Mid-Ohio	Steven Thompson	Brian Brothers	Tom Diehm	Calvin Stewart
F500	2017	Indianapolis	Wiley McMahan	Sven de Vries	Steven Thompson	Wiley McMahan
F500	2018	Sonoma	Lance Spiering	F Russell Strate Jr	John W Walbran	Jeff Jorgenson
F500	2019	VIR	Wiley McMahan	Calvin Stewart	Eric McRee	Wiley McMahan
F500	2020	Road America	Wiley McMahan	James Weida	Calvin Stewart	Calvin Stewart
F500	2021	Indianapolis	Sven de Vries	Ryan Mayfield	Calvin Stewart	Ryan Mayfield
F500	2022	VIR	Sven de Vries	James Weida	Eric McRee	James Weida
F600	2023	VIR	Calvin Stewart	Jason Martin	Keith Joslyn	Calvin Stewart
F600	2024	Road America	James Weida	Calvin Stewart	Aaron Ellis	Calvin Stewart
No race held
F600	2026	Road America	James Weida	Sven de Vries	Aaron Ellis	Calvin Stewart
