= Sportster =

Sportster may refer to several things, such as:

- Harley-Davidson Sportster, a line of motorcycles manufactured since 1957.
- ADI Sportster aircraft
- Sportster line of modems, manufactured by USRobotics
- a term used in Britain to describe 18th- and early 19th-century wealthy men of leisure who frequented sporting events such as horse-racing
- Theiss Sportster, an American biplane aircraft design of the 1990s.
- Warner Sportster, American light-sport aircraft
