= RW11 =

RW11 may mean:

- RagWing RW11 Rag-A-Bond - an ultralight aircraft
- 2003 RW11 - an asteroid
