= RagWing RW7 Duster =

General information
- Type: Ultralight aircraft
- National origin: United States
- Manufacturer: Ragwing Aircraft Designs
- Designer: Roger Mann
- Status: Plans available

History
- Developed from: RagWing RW4 Midwing Sport

The RagWing RW7 Duster is a single seat, low wing, strut-braced, single engine ultralight aircraft designed by Roger Mann and sold as plans by RagWing Aircraft Designs for amateur construction.

== Design and development ==
The RW7 was designed as a homebuilt aircraft category design as it is too heavy to be a US FAR 103 Ultralight Vehicles compliant aircraft with that category's 254 lb (115 kg) empty weight limit. The RW7 was designed as a homebuilt version of a classic crop duster and in fact can be fitted with a small aerial application system. The aircraft was developed from the earlier RagWing RW4 Midwing Sport, which in turn was developed from the RagWing RW1 Ultra-Piet. All aircraft share common construction materials and methods.

The airframe is constructed entirely from wood and covered with aircraft fabric. The landing gear is of conventional configuration. The aircraft's installed power range is 28 to 52 hp (21 to 39 kW) and the standard engine is the 50 hp (37 kW) Rotax 503, although the 38 hp (28 kW) Kawasaki 440, Volkswagen air-cooled engine and the 35 hp (26 kW) Half VW have also been used.

Partial kits and construction kits were available in the late 1990s, but today the aircraft is only offered as plans. Estimated construction time is 400–600 hours, although the designer estimates 400 hours. The aircraft can be built in a single car garage, with outdoor final assembly when the wings and fuselage are completed.

== Specifications (RW7) ==
Data from Cliche and RagWing

General characteristics

- Crew: one
- Length: 17 ft 0 in (5.18 m)
- Wingspan: 28 ft 0 in (8.53 m)
- Height: 5 ft 6 in (1.68 m)
- Wing area: 1,400 sq ft (130 m^{2})
- Empty weight: 275 lb (125 kg)
- Gross weight: 660 lb (299 kg)
- Fuel capacity: 5 US gallons (19 litres)
- Powerplant: 1 × Rotax 503 twin cylinder two stroke aircraft engine, 50 hp (37 kW)
- Propellers: 2-bladed wooden

Performance

- Cruise speed: 65 mph (105 km/h, 56 kn)
- Stall speed: 22 mph (35 km/h, 19 kn)
- Never exceed speed: 100 mph (160 km/h, 87 kn)
- Range: 200 mi (320 km, 170 nmi)
- Service ceiling: 12,500 ft (3,800 m)
- Rate of climb: 1,000 ft/min (5.1 m/s)
