= Super Solution =

Super Solution may refer to:

- Laird Super Solution, an American biplane racing aircraft from the 1930s
- V-STOL Super Solution 2000, an American homebuilt aircraft design from the 1990s
