= Troyer Sportsplane VX =

Sportsplane VX

General information
- Type: Homebuilt aircraft
- National origin: United States
- Manufacturer: Troyer Boats
- Designer: Troyer

The Troyer Sportplane VX is an American aircraft that was designed for homebuilt construction.

== Design and development ==
The Sportsman VX is a mid-wing, open cockpit aircraft with conventional landing gear. The fuselage is made from welded steel tubing with aircraft fabric covering, the wing construction is all-wood with spruce spars.

== Specifications (Troyer VX) ==
Data from Plane and Pilot

General characteristics

- Crew: 1
- Length: 15 ft 9 in (4.80 m)
- Wingspan: 23 ft 9 in (7.24 m)
- Height: 4 ft 10 in (1.47 m)
- Wing area: 90 sq ft (8.4 m^{2})
- Empty weight: 306 lb (139 kg)
- Gross weight: 456 lb (207 kg)
- Fuel capacity: 5 U.S. gallons (19 L; 4.2 imp gal)
- Powerplant: 1 × Heath-Henderson B-4 Inline four cylinder
- Propellers: 2-bladed

Performance

- Maximum speed: 83 kn (95 mph, 153 km/h)
- Cruise speed: 74 kn (85 mph, 137 km/h)
- Stall speed: 30 kn (34 mph, 55 km/h)
- Range: 170 nmi (200 mi, 320 km)
- Rate of climb: 800 ft/min (4.1 m/s)

== See also ==
- Long Henderson Longster
