= Long Harlequin 933 =

- Type: Horizontally Opposed Piston
- National origin: United States
- Designer: Leslie Long

The Long Harlequin is a two-cylinder horizontally opposed aircraft engine.

== Design and development ==
The Harlequin engine was developed as a replacement to the Heath-Henderson B-4 engine used on the Long Henderson Longster homebuilt aircraft. The cylinders were based on a 74 cubic inch Harley Davidson JD Engine with connecting rods from Continental built Star auto engine. The builder was expected to machine their own crankshaft, Les Long cast and sold crankcases

== Applications ==
- Long Longster

== Engines on display ==
- Eagles Mere Aircraft Museum

Dart Airport Museum in Mayville NY

Oregon Aviation Historical Society Cottage Grove Oregon

Glen Curtis Museum Hammondsport, New York

Two other examples known in private collections

== Specifications (Long Herlequin) ==
=== General characteristics ===
- Dry weight: 90lb

=== Components ===
- Fuel system: Single carburetor
- Cooling system: Air-cooled

=== Performance ===
- Power output: 30hp @2650rpm
