= Long Henderson Longster =

Henderson Longster

General information
- Type: Homebuilt aircraft
- National origin: United States
- Designer: Leslie Long, Ivan Diggs

History
- Introduction date: 1931
- Variant: Long Anzani Longster

The Long Henderson Longster HL-1 is an American aircraft that was designed by Leslie Long and Ivan Diggs for homebuilt construction.

== Design and development ==
The Henderson Longster is a conventional landing gear equipped, wire braced parasol wing aircraft. Aeronautical designer Ivan Diggs designed a new 30 ft wing for the Longster. The wire bracing is supported by a central cabane post located over a 1 U.S. gallon (3.8 L; 0.83 imp gal) above-wing fuel tank. The fuselage is steel tubing. The design also features pinned and brazed gusset joints as opposed to conventionally welded joint clusters.

== Variants ==
Henderson Longster
Harlequin Longster
Used a Long designed homebuilt engine, the Long Harlequin 933.

== Aircraft on display ==
An example of a Longster is on display at the Western Antique Aeroplane & Automobile Museum.

== Specifications (Long Henderson Longster) ==
Data from EAA Contact

General characteristics

- Crew: 1
- Wingspan: 30 ft (9.1 m)
- Airfoil: Clark Y
- Empty weight: 325 lb (147 kg)
- Powerplant: 1 × Heath-Henderson B-4 Inline four cylinder piston, 30 hp (22 kW)

Performance

- Maximum speed: 65 kn (75 mph, 121 km/h)

== See also ==
Related development

- Long Anzani Longster

Aircraft of comparable role, configuration, and era

- Heath Parasol
- Pietenpol Air Camper
