= St Andrews Viking =

Family of American powered parachutes

Viking

General information
- Type: Powered parachute
- National origin: United States
- Manufacturer: St Andrews Aviation; Viking Aircraft Inc.
- Status: Production completed

History
- Introduction date: 1998

The St Andrews Viking is a family of American powered parachutes that was designed and manufactured by St Andrews Aviation of Panama City, Florida and later produced by Viking Aircraft Inc., also of Panama City.

== Design and development ==
The two-seat Viking II was designed to comply with the US FAR 103 Ultralight Vehicles two-seat trainer rules. It features a parachute-style high-wing, two-seats-in-side-by-side configuration, tricycle landing gear and a single 50 hp (37 kW) Rotax 503 engine in pusher configuration. The 70 hp (52 kW) 2si 690-L70 engine was a factory option.

The aircraft is built from tubing and includes a partial cockpit fairing. The side-by-side seating configuration is unusual in powered parachutes, but was intended to make dual instruction easier. In flight steering is accomplished via dual foot pedals that actuate the canopy brakes, creating roll and yaw. On the ground the aircraft has a center-mounted bicycle handlebar that controls the nosewheel steering. The main landing gear incorporates steel spring rod suspension. The aircraft was factory supplied in the form of an assembly kit or could be delivered ready-to-fly.

== Variants ==
Viking I
Single seat version introduced in March 2000, that sold for US$10,900 complete and ready-to-fly in 2001.
Viking II
Two-seats-in-side-by-side configuration version introduced in 1998, that sold for US$12,000 complete and ready-to-fly, US$10,000 complete but unassembled or US$4,300 for the carriage kit only, less engine and canopy, in 2001.

== Specifications (Viking II) ==
Data from Cliche

General characteristics

- Crew: one
- Capacity: one passenger
- Wing area: 520 sq ft (48 m^{2})
- Empty weight: 270 lb (122 kg)
- Fuel capacity: 10 U.S. gallons (38 L; 8.3 imp gal)
- Powerplant: 1 × Rotax 503 twin cylinder, two-stroke, air-cooled aircraft engine, 50 hp (37 kW)
- Propellers: 3-bladed composite propeller

Performance

- Cruise speed: 30 mph (48 km/h, 26 kn)
- Rate of climb: 600 ft/min (3.0 m/s)
