= V-STOL Aircraft Corporation =

- Company type: Privately held company
- Industry: Aerospace
- Fate: Out of business
- Headquarters: Fort Myers, Florida, United States
- Key people: CEO: Dick Turner
- Products: Kit aircraft
- Owner: Venezuela STOL Aircraft C.A.

V-STOL Aircraft Corporation (sometimes written VSTOL Aircraft Corporation) was an aircraft manufacturer based in Fort Myers, Florida, United States. The company was owned by Venezuela STOL Aircraft C.A. and specialized in the design and manufacture of STOL kit aircraft for the North American market.

== History ==
The company was founded by Dick Turner as a subsidiary of Venezuela STOL Aircraft. V-STOL Aircraft Corporation carried out prototype and development work in Florida and produced small aircraft orders there, while main production was located in Caracas. Venezuela STOL Aircraft also produced the Venezuela STOL XC Aglite agricultural aircraft based on V-STOL designs for the South American market and other developing nations.

V-STOL Aircraft was preceded by Turner's earlier company, Starflight Manufacturing Inc, which was a pioneering ultralight manufacturer founded in 1980. That company produced the Starflight TriStar and the Starflight DBL, the first tandem-seat ultralight trainer. Those designs provided the basis for later V-STOL Aircraft models.

Turner gained early fame in the ultralight community as the manager of the US Ultralight Team that competed at the 1985 World Microlight Championships in France.

== Aircraft ==
Summary of aircraft built by V-STOL Aircraft Corporation
Model name	First flight	Number built	Type
V-STOL XC 2000T	1997	7	Side-by-side configuration seat STOL aircraft
V-STOL Solution	1998	2	Tandem seat or single seat STOL aircraft
V-STOL Super Solution 2000	1990s	2	Tandem seat STOL aircraft
V-STOL Pairadigm	late 1990s	at least one	Two seat side-by-side configuration twin-engine STOL aircraft
