= Presales =

Activities before a customer is acquired

Presales is a process or a set of activities/sales normally carried out before a customer is acquired, though sometimes presales also extends into the period the product or service is delivered to the customer.

There are many job titles associated with presales which largely overlap in responsibilities, e.g. Sales Engineer, Solution Engineer, Presales Engineer, Solution Consultant, Solution Architect and more.

== Responsibilities ==
In a typical sales cycle, the stages are:

1. Contact
2. Lead / suspect
3. Prospect / opportunity.

The task of a presales person starts from the initial contact phase and often ends once the customer has been acquired i.e. sale is made. In some cases, pre-sales also will provide some initial or post-sale transitional support. Note that while presales is a part of the sales process, it typically excludes the negotiation and contractual agreements.

The responsibilities differ from organization to organization but in general, include:

1. Solution preparation or management proposal based on customers requirements
2. Product demonstrations
3. Proof of concept creation
4. Relay prospective customer needs to the internal development team
5. Any other activity required to generate business

The software, IT services, and factory equipment industries provide a vital and significant role for presales professionals. The role of presales falls right in the middle marrying the customer needs to the (provider) company's services or products. This role is especially crucial in these industries because the products and services are often heavily customizable and also because the requirements of different customers are often unique. The presales professional thus understands what the customer needs, develops an initial view of the solution the customer needs, then tailors the product or service of his company to meet what the customer needs, explains (or helps sell) this solution to the customer, helps close the deal or sale and often stays on to ensure that the delivery team or product specialists that follow them provide the intended solution.

Areas of a specialty of presales include:

1. Discovery – A means to uncover details of business problems that the prospect has. The presales person will understand and closely analyze the prospect's requirements.
2. Preparation – Tailoring a prospect specific presentation or software presentation that precisely meets the needs of the prospect.
3. Demonstration – A demonstration of the vendor product that specifically addresses the prospects of business problems. It will be done in a manner that highlights an easy method to solve those problems using the tools available within the vendor's suite of products.
4. Request for proposal (RFP) – presales have a detailed knowledge of the product suite, in addition to its application to business problems. As such, presales are frequently involved in technical details in RFP preparation.
5. Marketing assistance – Typically the marketing department and presales department align closely. Given presales is directly in touch with the market, they can share market feedback with the marketing team. Presales will often create technical detail for use in marketing collateral.
6. Product management assistance – Presales are able to provide unparalleled market feedback to product managers that can be used to influence or provide feedback on product roadmap items.
7. Proposal assistance – Given presales were involved in the sale since the discovery of the prospect business problems, presales will often complete the business analysis and technical component of a sales proposal with case studies and facts.

== Other uses of the terms ==
Film pre-sales are a form of film finance that entails selling the right to distribute a film in different territories before the film is completed.

In Canada and the United States real estate properties that are sold before construction is completed are referred to as Presales. These properties are known as off-plan properties in the UK, Hong Kong, and Australia.

Sometimes, companies which release a product to a small, targeted group of potential buyers, prior to broader marketing and availability, refer to this limited early marketing period as "presales".

== See also ==
- Solution selling
- Presales / Sales Engineering Resources Playlist
