= The Solution =

The Solution may refer to:

- The Solution (Mannafest album), an album by indie rock band Mannafest
- The Solution (Beanie Sigel album), an album by rapper Beanie Sigel
- The Solution (Buckshot and 9th Wonder album), a collaboration album by rapper Buckshot and producer 9th Wonder
- The Solution (Animorphs), the twenty-second book in the Animorphs series
- "The Solution" (Alias episode), an episode of the television series Alias
- "Die Lösung" (poem), a poem by Bertolt Brecht whose title is usually translated as "The Solution"

== See also ==
- Solution (disambiguation)
- The Final Solution
