= Kawasaki 440 =

Japanese twin-cylinder, two-stroke engine

- Type: Two-cylinder two-stroke engine
- National origin: Japan
- Manufacturer: Kawasaki Heavy Industries
- Manufactured: until the early 1980s

The Kawasaki 440, also called the T/A 440, is a Japanese twin-cylinder, in-line, two-stroke engine that was designed for snowmobiles and produced by Kawasaki Heavy Industries until the early 1980s.

The engine was widely adapted for other purposes, including ultralight aircraft and Formula 500 automobile racing. Kawasaki did not condone or support the use of the engine in aircraft and it was largely supplanted in this role by the similar purpose-designed Rotax 377 aircraft engine.

== Design and development ==
The engine has two cylinders in an in-line configuration. The single ignition system uses a coil and points. Fuel is metered by a Mikuni 34 mm slide-type carburetor. Starting is by a recoil starter system with electric start as an option.

In its aircraft applications the 440 uses an aftermarket reduction drive system to reduce the maximum 5000 rpm to a speed more manageable for propeller use.

== Applications ==
Aircraft

- Acrolite
- Bell Sidewinder
- CGS Hawk
- Fisher Barnstormer
- Fisher Boomerang
- Golden Gate Mosquito
- Goldwing Ltd Goldwing
- Hovey Delta Hawk
- Manta Foxbat
- Mathews PUP
- Peris JN-1
- RagWing RW1 Ultra-Piet
- RagWing RW2 Special I
- RagWing RW7 Duster
- RagWing RW9 Motor Bipe
- Seahawk Condor
- Theiss Speedster
- Ultimate Jetwing
- Ultralight Flight Mirage
- Ultralite Soaring Wizard
- Vortech G-1
- Worldwide Ultralite Skyraider S/S
- Worldwide Ultralite Spitfire

Automotive

- Formula 500

== Specifications (440) ==
Data from Cliche

=== General characteristics ===
- Type: twin-cylinder, two-stroke engine
- Displacement: 436 cc (26.61 cu inches)
- Dry weight: 49 lb (22 kg)

=== Components ===
- Valvetrain: piston ported
- Fuel system: Mikuni 34 mm slide-type carburetor
- Oil system: premixed oil and fuel
- Cooling system: air cooled
- Reduction gear: aftermarket reduction drive for aircraft use

=== Performance ===
- Power output: 38 hp (28 kW) at 5000 rpm

== See also ==
- Hirth F-263
- Hirth 2702
- JPX PUL 425
- Rotax 377

Related development

- Kawasaki 340
