= Theiss Speedster =

American ultralight aircraft

Speedster

General information
- Type: Ultralight aircraft
- National origin: United States
- Manufacturer: Theiss Aviation
- Status: Production completed
- Number built: At least two

The Theiss Speedster is an American Homebuilt ultralight biplane that was designed and produced by Theiss Aviation of Salem, Ohio. When it was available, the aircraft was supplied as a quick-build kit for amateur construction.

The Speedster is intended to resemble a 1920s era sport aircraft.

== Design and development ==
The aircraft was designed to comply with the US FAR 103 Ultralight Vehicles rules, including the category's maximum empty weight of 254 lb (115 kg).

The Speedster features a strut-braced biplane layout with interplane struts, a single-seat open cockpit, fixed conventional landing gear with wheel pants, and a single engine in tractor configuration. The top wing is mounted on top of the fuselage instead of the more usual arrangement with cabane struts suspending it above the fuselage.

The aircraft is made from a combination of aluminium, wood, steel, and foam. Its 17.50 ft (5.3 m) span wing has a total wing area of 77.50 sq ft (7.200 m^{2}). The cabin width is 20 in (51 cm). The acceptable power range is 38 to 55 hp (28 to 41 kW), and the standard engine used is the two-stroke 40 hp (30 kW) Kawasaki 440 snowmobile powerplant.

The Speedster has a typical empty weight of 252 lb (114 kg) and a gross weight of 460 lb (210 kg), giving a useful load of 208 lb (94 kg). With full fuel of 5 U.S. gallons (19 L; 4.2 imp gal), the payload for the pilot and baggage is 178 lb (81 kg).

The standard day, sea level, no wind, take off and landing roll with a 40 hp (30 kW) engine is 200 ft (61 m).

The manufacturer estimates the construction time from the supplied kit as 400 hours.

After producing the Speedster, the company turned its attention to producing unmanned aerial vehicles for the US Navy and no longer produces manned aircraft.

== Operational history ==
By 1998, the company reported that two aircraft were completed and flying.

== Specifications (Speedster) ==
Data from AeroCrafter

General characteristics

- Crew: one
- Length: 13 ft 8 in (4.17 m)
- Wingspan: 17 ft 6 in (5.33 m)
- Wing area: 77.50 sq ft (7.200 m^{2})
- Empty weight: 252 lb (114 kg)
- Gross weight: 460 lb (209 kg)
- Fuel capacity: 5 U.S. gallons (19 L; 4.2 imp gal)
- Powerplant: 1 × Kawasaki 440 twin cylinder, air-cooled, two stroke snowmobile engine, 40 hp (30 kW)
- Propellers: 2-bladed wooden

Performance

- Maximum speed: 75 mph (121 km/h, 65 kn)
- Cruise speed: 62 mph (100 km/h, 54 kn)
- Stall speed: 29 mph (47 km/h, 25 kn)
- Range: 125 mi (201 km, 109 nmi)
- Rate of climb: 700 ft/min (3.6 m/s)
- Wing loading: 5.9 lb/sq ft (29 kg/m^{2})
