= RagWing RW8 PT2S =

Single or two seat, single engine ultralight aircraft

General information
- Type: Ultralight aircraft
- National origin: United States
- Manufacturer: Ragwing Aircraft Designs
- Designer: Roger Mann
- Status: Plans available
- Number built: 3 (1999)

History
- Introduction date: 1993
- First flight: 1993

The RagWing RW8 PT2S is a single or two seat, high wing, strut-braced, single engine ultralight aircraft designed by Roger Mann and sold as plans by RagWing Aircraft Designs for amateur construction.

== Design and development ==
The RW8 was designed for the US experimental homebuilt aircraft category for single seat flying or as a US FAR 103 Ultralight Vehicles two-seat ultralight trainer and first flown in 1993.

The airframe is constructed entirely from wood and covered with aircraft fabric. The landing gear is of conventional configuration with bungee suspension with tricycle gear optional. The aircraft's installed power range is 52 to 75 hp (39 to 56 kW) and the standard engine is the 52 hp (39 kW) Rotax 503, although the 70 hp (52 kW) 2si 540 has also been used.

The PT2S is only offered as plans and the designer estimates it will take 500 hours to complete the aircraft.

== Variants ==
RW8 PT2S
Two seat side-by-side configuration ultralight trainer, Pilot Trainer, 2 Seat
RW8 ALF
Single seat Affordable Light Flyer

== Specifications (RW8) ==
Data from Kitplanes, Purdy and RagWing

General characteristics

- Crew: one
- Capacity: one passenger
- Length: 17 ft 0 in (5.18 m)
- Wingspan: 30 ft 0 in (9.14 m)
- Height: 6 ft 0 in (1.83 m)
- Wing area: 1,450 sq ft (135 m^{2})
- Empty weight: 460 lb (209 kg)
- Gross weight: 900 lb (408 kg)
- Fuel capacity: 10 US gallons (38 litres)
- Powerplant: 1 × Rotax 503 twin cylinder two stroke aircraft engine, 52 hp (39 kW)
- Propellers: 2-bladed wooden

Performance

- Cruise speed: 75 mph (121 km/h, 65 kn)
- Stall speed: 36 mph (58 km/h, 31 kn)
- Never exceed speed: 105 mph (169 km/h, 91 kn)
- Range: 260 mi (420 km, 230 nmi)
- Service ceiling: 10,000 ft (3,000 m)
- Rate of climb: 650 ft/min (3.3 m/s)
