= 2si 690 =

Type of engine for ultralight aircraft

- Type: Two-stroke aircraft engine
- National origin: United States
- Manufacturer: 2si

The 2si 690 is a family of in-line three cylinder, liquid-cooled, two-stroke, dual ignition, aircraft engines that were designed for ultralight aircraft.

The basic engine was originally designed and produced by JLO-Motorenwerke of Germany and was later acquired by the AMW Cuyuna Engine Company of Beaufort, South Carolina and marketed under the Cuyuna brand name. Later the engine was marketed by Cuyuna under the Two Stroke International (2si) brand. Cuyuna no longer markets engines for aircraft use although the 690 is still in production as an industrial and marine engine.

== Development ==
The 690 is a conventional three-cylinder engine that weighs 89 lb (40 kg) in its L70 aircraft and marine versions. The aircraft engine features dual capacitor discharge ignition (single in the marine and industrial versions), reed valve porting, tuned exhaust system, three slide venturi-type carburetors, liquid cooling, fuel pumps, a cast iron cylinder liner, ball, needle and roller bearings throughout. The aircraft version was offered with an optional gearbox reduction dive system and a centrifugal clutch. The current industrial and marine version has an available gearbox with ratios of 2.04, 2.65 or 3.06:1. Starting is electric start only.

== Variants ==
690-L70 aircraft engine
Gasoline aircraft engine with triple carburetors, 70 hp (52 kW) at 6250 rpm, weight 89 lb (40 kg), out of production.
690L-70 industrial and marine engine
Gasoline industrial and marine engine, triple carburetors, 70 hp (52 kW) at 6250 rpm, weight 89 lb (40 kg), electric starter mounted on the accessory cover end. Still in production.
690AL-70 industrial and marine engine
Gasoline industrial and marine engine, triple carburetors, 70 hp (52 kW) at 6250 rpm, weight 89 lb (40 kg), electric starter mounted on the power take-off end. Still in production.

== Applications ==
Aircraft

- RagWing RW11 Rag-A-Bond
- RagWing RW19 Stork
- RagWing RW22 Tiger Moth
- Sky Science PowerHawk
- St Andrews Viking
- Viking Aircraft Viking II

== Specifications (690-L70 aircraft engine) ==
Data from Cliche & 2si

=== General characteristics ===
- Type: Three-cylinder, two-stroke aircraft engine
- Bore: 69.5 mm (2.74 in)
- Stroke: 60 mm (2.36 in)
- Displacement: 684 cc (41.7 cu in)
- Length: 21.6 in (549 mm)
- Width: 19.05 in (484 mm)
- Height: 13.9 in (353 mm)
- Dry weight: 89 lb (40 kg)

=== Components ===
- Valvetrain: reed valve porting
- Fuel type: Minimum 92 octane
- Oil system: premixed oil and fuel at 50:1
- Cooling system: liquid cooled
- Reduction gear: optional gearbox

=== Performance ===
- Power output: 70 hp (52 kW) at 6250 rpm
- Fuel consumption: 5.1 US gal/h (19.3 L/h) at 75% power

== See also ==
- List of aircraft engines
- Hirth 3701
- Rotax 618
