= 2si 230 =

- Type: Two-stroke aircraft engine
- National origin: United States
- Manufacturer: 2si

The 2si 230 is a family of single-cylinder, two-stroke, single ignition, aircraft engines that were designed for ultralight aircraft.

The basic engine was originally designed and produced by JLO-Motorenwerke of Germany and was later acquired by the AMW Cuyuna Engine Company of Beaufort, South Carolina and marketed under the Cuyuna brand name. Later the engine was marketed by Cuyuna under the Two Stroke International (2si) brand. Cuyuna no longer markets engines for aircraft use although the 230 is still in production as a diesel/multifuel or gasoline industrial and marine engine.

== Development ==
The 230 is a conventional single-cylinder engine that weighs only 36 lb (16 kg) in its A20 version. The engine features single capacitor discharge ignition, piston porting, tuned exhaust system, slide venturi-type carburetor, fuel pump, a cast iron cylinder liner, ball, needle and roller bearings throughout. The engine was offered with cog belt drive or a gearbox reduction system. Starting is electric starter or recoil starter.

== Variants ==
230-A20
Gasoline aircraft engine, 20 hp (15 kW) at 6000 rpm, weight 36 lb (16 kg), out of production.
230F-20
Gasoline industrial engine, 20 hp (15 kW) at 6000 rpm, weight 47 lb (21 kg) without gearbox, still in production.
230-F22
Gasoline aircraft engine, 22 hp (16 kW) at 6500 rpm, weight 48 lb (22 kg), out of production.
230 MF
Diesel/multifuel industrial and marine engine, 15 hp (11 kW) at 5700 rpm, still in production.

== Specifications (230-A20) ==
Data from Cliche

=== General characteristics ===
- Type: Single-cylinder, two-stroke aircraft engine
- Bore: 69.5 mm (2.74 in)
- Stroke: 60.0 mm (2.36 in)
- Displacement: 228 cc (13.91 cu in)
- Length: 11.7 in (297.18 mm)
- Width: 14.6 in (370.84 mm)
- Height: 14.0 in (355.60 mm)
- Dry weight: 36 lb (16 kg)

=== Components ===
- Valvetrain: piston porting
- Fuel type: Minimum 92 octane
- Oil system: premixed oil and fuel
- Cooling system: air-cooled
- Reduction gear: cog belt or optional gearbox

=== Performance ===
- Power output: 20 hp (15 kW) at 6000 rpm

== See also ==
- List of aircraft engines
- Hirth F33
- KFM 107
- Rotax 277
