= V-STOL Pairadigm =

American homebuilt STOL aircraft

Pairadigm

General information
- Type: Homebuilt aircraft
- National origin: United States
- Manufacturer: V-STOL Aircraft Corporation
- Status: Production completed
- Number built: at least one

History
- Introduction date: late 1990s

The V-STOL Pairadigm (English: Paradigm) is an American twin-engine center-line thrust STOL homebuilt aircraft that was designed and produced by V-STOL Aircraft Corporation of Fort Myers, Florida, introduced in the late 1990s. When it was available the aircraft was supplied as a kit for amateur construction.

== Design and development ==
The Pairadigm features a strut-braced high-wing, a two-seats-in-side-by-side configuration semi-enclosed cockpit with a windshield, fixed tricycle landing gear and two fuselage-mounted engines, one in tractor configuration in the nose and the other in pusher configuration in the rear fuselage.

The aircraft is made from bolted-together aluminum tubing, with its flying surfaces covered in doped aircraft fabric. Its 32.0 ft (9.8 m) span high-lift wing mounts flaps, is supported by V-struts and has a wing area of 160 sq ft (15 m^{2}). The tail is a conventional low-tail design. The cabin width is 43 in (110 cm). The acceptable power range is 40 to 75 hp (30 to 56 kW) and the standard engines used are two 45 hp (34 kW) 2si 460 in-line twin-cylinder, two-stroke, single ignition powerplants.

The aircraft has a typical empty weight of 700 lb (320 kg) and a gross weight of 1,400 lb (640 kg), giving a useful load of 700 lb (320 kg). With full fuel of 24 U.S. gallons (91 L; 20 imp gal) the payload for the pilot, passenger and baggage is 556 lb (252 kg).

The standard day, sea level, no wind, take off with twin 45 hp (34 kW) engines is 100 ft (30 m) and the landing roll is 200 ft (61 m).

The manufacturer estimated the construction time from the supplied kit as 250 hours.

== Operational history ==
By 1998 the company reported that 10 kits had been sold and one aircraft had been completed and was flying, with the design generally available from July 1998.

As of May 2015 no examples were registered in the United States with the Federal Aviation Administration.

== Specifications (Pairadigm) ==
Data from AeroCrafter

General characteristics

- Crew: one
- Capacity: one passenger
- Length: 22 ft 0 in (6.71 m)
- Wingspan: 32 ft 0 in (9.75 m)
- Wing area: 160.0 sq ft (14.86 m^{2})
- Aspect ratio: 6.4:1
- Empty weight: 700 lb (318 kg)
- Gross weight: 1,400 lb (635 kg)
- Fuel capacity: 24 U.S. gallons (91 L; 20 imp gal)
- Powerplant: 2 × 2si 460 twin cylinder, air-cooled, two stroke aircraft engines, 45 hp (34 kW) each

Performance

- Maximum speed: 90 mph (140 km/h, 78 kn)
- Cruise speed: 80 mph (130 km/h, 70 kn)
- Stall speed: 20 mph (32 km/h, 17 kn) flaps down
- Range: 250 mi (400 km, 220 nmi)
- Service ceiling: 15,000 ft (4,600 m)
- Rate of climb: 1,200 ft/min (6.1 m/s)
- Wing loading: 8.75 lb/sq ft (42.7 kg/m^{2})
