= V-STOL Super Solution 2000 =

American homebuilt STOL aircraft

Super Solution 2000

General information
- Type: Homebuilt aircraft
- National origin: United States
- Manufacturer: V-STOL Aircraft Corporation
- Designer: Dick Turner
- Status: Production completed
- Number built: Two

History
- Developed from: V-STOL Solution

The V-STOL Super Solution 2000 is an American STOL homebuilt aircraft that was designed by Dick Turner and produced by V-STOL Aircraft Corporation of Fort Myers, Florida. When it was available the aircraft was supplied as a kit for amateur construction.

== Design and development ==
Developed from the V-STOL Solution, the Super Solution 2000 was developed for flight training, recreational flying and crop dusting. It features a cable-braced parasol wing, a two-seats-in-tandem open cockpit without a windshield, fixed conventional landing gear with wheel pants and a single engine in pusher configuration.

The aircraft is made from bolted-together aluminum tubing, with its flying surfaces covered in Dacron sailcloth. Its 32.00 ft (9.8 m) span wing uses a single surface high-lift airfoil, mounts flaps and has a wing area of 165.0 sq ft (15.33 m^{2}). The cockpit width is 34 in (86 cm). The acceptable power range is 40 to 75 hp (30 to 56 kW) and the standard engine used is the 45 hp (34 kW) 2si 460 two-stroke powerplant. Original factory options included a full cockpit enclosure and dual controls.

The Super Solution 2000 has a typical empty weight of 380 lb (170 kg) and a gross weight of 890 lb (400 kg), giving a useful load of 510 lb (230 kg). With full fuel of 10 U.S. gallons (38 L; 8.3 imp gal) the payload for the pilot, passenger and baggage is 450 lb (200 kg).

The standard day, sea level, no wind, take off with a 45 hp (34 kW) engine is 100 ft (30 m) and the landing roll is 150 ft (46 m). The take-off speed while flying solo is18 mph (29 km/h).

The manufacturer estimated the construction time from the supplied kit as 100 hours.

== Operational history ==
By 1998 the company reported that six kits had been sold and two aircraft were completed and flying.

In March 2014 no examples were registered in the United States with the Federal Aviation Administration, although one had been registered at one time.

== Specifications (Super Solution 2000) ==
Data from AeroCrafter

General characteristics

- Crew: one
- Capacity: one passenger
- Length: 20 ft 0 in (6.10 m)
- Wingspan: 32 ft 0 in (9.75 m)
- Wing area: 165.0 sq ft (15.33 m^{2})
- Airfoil: single surface, high-lift
- Empty weight: 380 lb (172 kg)
- Gross weight: 890 lb (404 kg)
- Fuel capacity: 10 U.S. gallons (38 L; 8.3 imp gal)
- Powerplant: 1 × 2si 460 twin cylinder, air-cooled, two stroke aircraft engine, 45 hp (34 kW)
- Propellers: 3-bladed composite, ground adjustable

Performance

- Cruise speed: 40 mph (64 km/h, 35 kn)
- Never exceed speed: 90 mph (140 km/h, 78 kn)
- Range: 100 mi (160 km, 87 nmi)
- Service ceiling: 13,500 ft (4,100 m)
- Rate of climb: 500 ft/min (2.5 m/s)
- Wing loading: 5.4 lb/sq ft (26 kg/m^{2})
