= RagWing Aircraft Designs =

American aircraft manufacturer

- Company type: Private company
- Industry: Aerospace
- Founded: 1987
- Founder: Roger Mann
- Defunct: January 2000
- Fate: Closed down
- Headquarters: Taylors, South Carolina, United States
- Key people: CEO: Roger Mann
- Products: Aircraft plans Aircraft kits
- Website: www.rogermann.org

RagWing Aircraft Designs (also called the RagWing Aeroplane Company and RagWing Aviation) was an American aircraft design and manufacturing company based in Taylors, South Carolina.

The company was founded in 1987 and closed down in January 2000.

== History ==
Roger Mann founded RagWing after he left the United States Air Force in 1987 as a multi-service aviation company providing flight instruction, maintenance, prototype design and flight testing of homebuilt aircraft. Mann's first aircraft design was marketed in 1991 and his range of products include 14 different fixed-wing aircraft designs. In the 1990s the company provided complete aircraft kits (less engines), but since the company closed in January 2000 this has been reduced to providing plans only and builder support. Mann stated in 2012 that, "plans are still available but are mainly sold for their historical value".

The company's products are predominantly designs for aircraft of glued wooden construction, covered in aircraft fabric, hence the name of the company.

== Aircraft ==
Summary of aircraft built by RagWing Aircraft Designs
Model name	First flight	Number built	Type
RW1 Ultra-Piet		22 (January 1999)	Parasol-wing, single-seat Pietenpol Air Camper replica ultralight aircraft
RW2 Special I		5 (December 2007)	Biplane, single-seat Pitts Special S-1 replica
RW4 Midwing Sport		3 (January 1999)	Mid-wing, single-seat Church Midwing Sport Monoplane replica
RW5 Heath Replica	1994		Parasol-wing, single-seat Heath Parasol replica
RW6 Rag-A-Muffin	1994		Parasol-wing, single-seat ultralight aircraft
RW7 Duster			Low-wing, single seat, crop duster replica
RW8 PT2S		3 (January 1999)	High-wing, two-seat trainer
RW9 Motor Bipe		1 (January 1999)	Biplane, single-seat ultralight
RW16 Aerial			Parasol-wing, single-seat ultralight
RW11 Rag-A-Bond		4 (1998)	High-wing, two-seat Piper Vagabond replica
RW19 Stork	August 1997	9 (December 2007)	High-wing, two-seat Fieseler Storch replica
RW20 Stork side-by-side	August 1997		High-wing, two-seat Fieseler Storch replica
RW22 Tiger Moth	June 1999	1 (December 2000)	Biplane, two seat de Havilland Tiger Moth replica
RW26 Special II		2 (December 2007)	Biplane, two seat Pitts Special S-2 replica
