= 2si 460 =

I-2 piston aircraft engine

- Type: Two-stroke aircraft engine
- National origin: United States
- Manufacturer: 2si

The 2si 460 is a family of in-line twin-cylinder, two-stroke, single ignition, aircraft engines that were designed for ultralight aircraft.

The basic engine was originally designed and produced by ILO-Motorenwerke of Germany and was later acquired by the AMW Cuyuna Engine Company of Beaufort, South Carolina and marketed under the Cuyuna brand name. Later the engine was marketed by Cuyuna under the Two Stroke International (2si) brand. Cuyuna no longer markets engines for aircraft use, although the 460 is still in production as a Diesel/multifuel or gasoline industrial, marine and sport vehicle engine.

== Development ==
The 460 is a conventional twin-cylinder engine that weighs 59 lb (27 kg) in its F35 aircraft version. The engine features single capacitor discharge ignition, piston porting, tuned exhaust system, one or two slide venturi-type carburetors, fuel pump, a cast iron cylinder liner, ball, needle and roller bearings throughout. The aircraft version was offered with cog belt drive or a gearbox reduction system. Starting is electric starter or recoil starter.

== Variants ==
460-F35
Gasoline aircraft engine, single carburetor, 35 hp (26 kW) at 6000 rpm, weight 59 lb (27 kg) (discontinued).
460-F40
Gasoline aircraft engine, single carburetor, 40 hp (30 kW) at 6500 rpm, weight 70 lb (32 kg) (discontinued).
460-F45
Gasoline aircraft engine, dual carburetors, 45 hp (34 kW) at 6750 rpm, weight 70 lb (32 kg) (discontinued).
460 MF
Diesel/multi-fuel engine for marine and industrial applications, 37 hp (28 kW) at 6000 rpm, weight 78.5 lb (36 kg) without gearbox.
460F-35
Gasoline industrial engine and sport vehicle engine for auto racing, kart and All-terrain vehicle applications, single carburetor, 35 hp (26 kW) at 6000 rpm, basic weight 55 lb (25 kg).
460FE-35
Gasoline industrial engine and sport vehicle engine for auto racing, kart and ATV applications with electric start, single carburetor, 35 hp (26 kW) at 6000 rpm, basic weight 55 lb (25 kg).
460L-50
Gasoline marine engine powering a jet pump, 50 hp (37 kW) at 6750 rpm.

== Applications ==
- Aero-Works Aerolite 103
- Calumet Snobird Explorer
- Denney Kitfox
- Fisher Avenger
- Fletcher Hercules
- Goodwin Buckshot
- Harmening High Flyer
- Heldeberg Spirit 103
- Little Wing Roto-Pup
- RagWing RW1 Ultra-Piet
- RagWing RW2 Special I
- RagWing RW9 Motor Bipe
- Raven Explorer I
- Spacek SD-1 Minisport
- V-STOL Pairadigm
- V-STOL Super Solution 2000
- V-STOL XC 2000T
- Wings of Freedom Flitplane

== Specifications (460-F35 aircraft engine) ==
Data from Cliche

=== General characteristics ===
- Type: Twin-cylinder, two-stroke aircraft engine
- Bore: 69.5 mm (2.74 in)
- Stroke: 60.0 mm (2.36 in)
- Displacement: 455 cc (27.77 cu in)
- Length: 14.5 in (368.30 mm)
- Width: 16.0 in (406.40 mm)
- Height: 16.0 in (406.40 mm)
- Dry weight: 59 lb (27 kg)

=== Components ===
- Valvetrain: piston porting
- Fuel type: Minimum 92 octane
- Oil system: premixed oil and fuel
- Cooling system: fan cooled
- Reduction gear: cog belt or optional gearbox

=== Performance ===
- Power output: 35 hp (26 kW) at 6000 rpm

== See also ==
- List of aircraft engines
- Hirth 2702
- Rotax 377
