= Peris JN-1 =

American homebuilt aircraft

General information
- Type: Homebuilt aircraft
- National origin: United States
- Designer: Jim Peris
- Status: Plans no longer available (2014)
- Number built: 20

The Peris JN-1 is an American homebuilt aircraft that was designed by Jim Peris of Lancaster, Pennsylvania. When it was available the aircraft was supplied in the form of plans for amateur construction.

The plans for the JN-1 were originally marketed by the designer and then after his death, by his wife, Nancy Peris. Following her death the plans became no longer available.

== Design and development ==
The JN-1 was designed to be a very economical aircraft to build and fly. The prototype was constructed for US$2500 in the mid-1980s. It features a strut-braced high-wing, a single-seat, enclosed cockpit accessed via a door, fixed conventional landing gear with wheel pants and a single engine in tractor configuration.

The aircraft is made from a combination of wood, foam and fiberglass. The main structure is built from sheet foam and covered in fiberglass, as are the fuselage bulkheads, the wing ribs, stabilizers, and the rudder. The fuselage longerons, wing and tail spars, the landing gear mounts, and firewall are all made from Douglas fir, with the spars solid, not laminates. The formers are made from foam, fiberglassed on both sides for strength. All fittings are made from 4130 steel. The landing gear is fabricated from an automotive leaf spring wrapped with 3-inch fiberglass and mounts wheelbarrow wheels. The wheel pants are made from foam, covered in fiberglass and then hollowed out. Its 30.00 ft (9.1 m) span wing has no flaps, has a wing area of 140.0 sq ft (13.01 m^{2}) and folds for ground storage or transportation. The acceptable power range is 38 to 50 hp (28 to 37 kW) and the standard engine used is the 38 hp (28 kW) Kawasaki 440 snowmobile powerplant.

The JN-1 has a typical empty weight of 320 lb (150 kg) and a gross weight of 600 lb (270 kg), giving a useful load of 280 lb (130 kg). With full fuel of 5 U.S. gallons (19 L; 4.2 imp gal) the payload for the pilot and baggage is 250 lb (110 kg).

The standard day, sea level, no wind, take off and landing roll with a 38 hp (28 kW) engine is 250 ft (76 m).

The manufacturer estimates the construction time from the supplied plans as 800 hours. Builders have indicated that the plans are not very clear or complete and much is left up to the builder to figure out.

The designer said of the aircraft: "I didn’t go for any high-tech sort of plane; this one was fun to design and build. Really a very inexpensive hobby! I guess you could spend $2,500 in a couple of years playing golf or bowling. The test flight was a couple of hours long, and we had a lot of fun with a J-4 Cub and a Vagabond, all flying formation and taking pictures. It flies very stable, no bad habits, and cruises 55 to 60 mph. Takeoff is in 250 feet with climbout at 40 mph. Rate of climb is 600 feet/minute. Approach at 40 mph and land at about 28 mph. All speeds are indicated."

== Operational history ==
By 1998 the designer reported that 20 aircraft were completed and flying.

In January 2014 three examples were registered in the United States with the Federal Aviation Administration, although a total of seven had been registered at one time.

== Specifications (JN-1) ==
Data from AeroCrafter and Pilot Friend

General characteristics

- Crew: one
- Length: 17 ft 4 in (5.28 m)
- Wingspan: 30 ft 0 in (9.14 m)
- Wing area: 140.0 sq ft (13.01 m^{2})
- Empty weight: 320 lb (145 kg)
- Gross weight: 600 lb (272 kg)
- Fuel capacity: 5 U.S. gallons (19 L; 4.2 imp gal)
- Powerplant: 1 × Kawasaki 440 twin cylinder, air-cooled, two stroke snowmobile engine, 38 hp (28 kW)
- Propellers: 2-bladed wooden

Performance

- Maximum speed: 65 mph (105 km/h, 56 kn)
- Cruise speed: 60 mph (97 km/h, 52 kn)
- Stall speed: 28 mph (45 km/h, 24 kn)
- Range: 110 mi (180 km, 96 nmi)
- Service ceiling: 10,000 ft (3,000 m)
- Rate of climb: 600 ft/min (3.0 m/s)
- Wing loading: 4.3 lb/sq ft (21 kg/m^{2})
