= Fletcher Hercules =

American ultralight airplane

Hercules

General information
- Type: Ultralight trike
- National origin: United States
- Manufacturer: Fletcher's Ultralights
- Designer: AW Harrison
- Status: Production completed
- Number built: 25 (February 2000)

The Fletcher Hercules is an American two-seat ultralight trike that was designed by AW Harrison and produced by Fletcher's Ultralights of Turlock, California, in the late 1990s and early 2000s. The aircraft was supplied as a kit for amateur construction and was also available as a completed aircraft.

== Design and development ==
The Hercules was designed as a lightweight single-seat aircraft, with a second seat available to carry an instructor or passenger when required. Because it was intended to be flown solo most of the time it came factory-supplied with a relatively low powered engine, to reduce both the aircraft's cost and weight. Higher powered engines were available if the aircraft was to be used in the training role on a regular basis.

In writing about the Hercules, reviewer Andre Cliche explained the engine choice, "Because most people usually fly alone in their two-seater, it makes for a well balanced single seater with peppy performance, low fuel burn and longer range. However, when comes the time to carry an occasional passenger, its two-seater capacity far outweighs its anemic performance with two people aboard. This is a smart compromise that gives the best of both worlds."

The Hercules was designed to comply with the US FAR 103 Ultralight Vehicles rules when flown as a single-seater, including the category's maximum empty weight of 254 lb (115 kg). The aircraft has a standard empty weight of 254 lb (115 kg). It features a cable-braced hang glider-style high-wing, weight-shift controls, a two-seats-in-tandem open cockpit, tricycle landing gear and a single engine in pusher configuration.

The aircraft is made from bolted-together aluminum tubing, with its single surface wing covered in Dacron sailcloth. Its 34 ft (10.4 m) span wing is supported by a single tube-type kingpost and uses an "A" frame control bar. The standard wing supplied was the Mustang double-surface wing of 190 sq ft (18 m^{2}). A smaller wing of 145 sq ft (13.5 m^{2}) was available to increase cruising speed at the cost of a higher stall speed.

The aircraft has an acceptable installed power range of 35 to 80 hp (26 to 60 kW). The standard engine supplied was the twin cylinder two-stroke 35 hp (26 kW) 2si 460-F35, with the 50 hp (37 kW) Rotax 503 or the 64 hp (48 kW) Rotax 582 engines available as options. Other engines used include the 35 hp (26 kW) Cuyuna UL II-02, 40 hp (30 kW) Rotax 447, 74 hp (55 kW) Rotax 618 and the four-stroke 60 hp (45 kW) HKS 700E.

Due to its off-airport capabilities the Hercules was nicknamed "the jeep of trikes". It is noted for its ease of set-up and repair. Twenty-five had been completed and flown by February 2000.

== Variants ==
Hercules Cruiser
Version marketed circa 1998 with 35 hp (26 kW) Cuyuna UL II-02 engine
Hercules Cross Country
Version marketed circa 1998 with 50 hp (37 kW) Rotax 503 engine

== Specifications (version) ==
Data from Cliche and Kitplanes

General characteristics

- Crew: one
- Capacity: one passenger
- Length: 9 ft (2.7 m)
- Wingspan: 34 ft (10 m)
- Height: 10 ft (3.0 m)
- Wing area: 190 sq ft (18 m^{2})
- Empty weight: 254 lb (115 kg)
- Gross weight: 600 lb (272 kg)
- Fuel capacity: 5 U.S. gallons (19 L; 4.2 imp gal)
- Powerplant: 1 × 2si 460-F35 twin cylinder two-stroke, 35 hp (26 kW)

Performance

- Cruise speed: 40 mph (64 km/h, 35 kn)
- Stall speed: 28 mph (45 km/h, 24 kn)
- Range: 85 mi (137 km, 74 nmi)
- Service ceiling: 12,000 ft (3,700 m)
- Rate of climb: 400 ft/min (2.0 m/s)
