= V-STOL XC 2000T =

American homebuilt aircraft

XC 2000T

General information
- Type: Homebuilt aircraft
- National origin: United States
- Manufacturer: V-STOL Aircraft
- Status: Production completed
- Number built: 7

History
- Introduction date: Fall of 1997
- Developed from: Starflight XC2000

The V-STOL XC 2000T is an American homebuilt and ultralight trainer aircraft that was designed and produced by V-STOL Aircraft of Fort Myers, Florida, introduced in the fall of 1997. When it was available the aircraft was supplied as a kit for amateur construction.

== Design and development ==
A derivative of the Starflight XC2000, the aircraft features a wire-braced parasol wing, a two-seats-in-side-by-side configuration open cockpit with a windshield, fixed tricycle landing gear and a single engine in pusher configuration.

The XC 2000T is made from bolted-together aluminum tubing, with its flying surfaces covered in Dacron sailcloth. Its 32.00 ft (9.8 m) span wing is supported by an inverted "V" kingpost, mounts large flaps and has a wing area of 176.0 sq ft (16.35 m^{2}). The cabin width is 43 in (110 cm). The acceptable power range is 40 to 75 hp (30 to 56 kW) and the standard engine used is the 45 hp (34 kW) 2si 460 two-stroke powerplant. The tailboom is an open Warren truss structure. Dual controls and an enclosed cabin were factory options.

The aircraft has a typical empty weight of 380 lb (170 kg) and a gross weight of 890 lb (400 kg), giving a useful load of 510 lb (230 kg). With full fuel of 10 U.S. gallons (38 L; 8.3 imp gal) the payload for the pilot, passenger and baggage is 450 lb (200 kg).

The standard day, sea level, no wind, takeoff and landing roll with a 40 hp (30 kW) engine is 150 ft (46 m).

The manufacturer estimated the construction time from the supplied kit as 100 hours.

== Operational history ==
By 1998 the company reported that three kits had been sold and two aircraft were completed and flying.

In March 2014 four examples were registered in the United States with the Federal Aviation Administration, although a total of seven had been registered at one time.

== Specifications (XC 2000T) ==
Data from AeroCrafter

General characteristics

- Crew: one
- Capacity: one passenger
- Length: 20 ft 0 in (6.10 m)
- Wingspan: 32 ft 0 in (9.75 m)
- Wing area: 176.0 sq ft (16.35 m^{2})
- Empty weight: 380 lb (172 kg)
- Gross weight: 890 lb (404 kg)
- Fuel capacity: 10 U.S. gallons (38 L; 8.3 imp gal)
- Powerplant: 1 × 2si 460 twin cylinder, air-cooled, two stroke aircraft engine, 40 hp (30 kW)
- Propellers: 2-bladed wooden fixed pitch

Performance

- Maximum speed: 90 mph (140 km/h, 78 kn)
- Cruise speed: 40 mph (64 km/h, 35 kn)
- Stall speed: 20 mph (32 km/h, 17 kn) flaps down
- Range: 100 mi (160 km, 87 nmi)
- Service ceiling: 13,500 ft (4,100 m)
- Rate of climb: 500 ft/min (2.5 m/s)
- Wing loading: 5.1 lb/sq ft (25 kg/m^{2})
