= Mathews PUP =

American ultralight aircraft

PUP

General information
- Type: Ultralight aircraft
- National origin: United States
- Designer: Lyle Mathews
- Status: Plans no longer available

History
- Introduction date: 1983

The Mathews PUP (Perfect Ultralight Plane), also called the P.U.P., is an American ultralight aircraft that was designed by Lyle Mathews in 1983 and made available in the form of plans for amateur construction.

== Design and development ==
The aircraft was designed to comply with the US FAR 103 Ultralight Vehicles rules, including the category's maximum empty weight of 254 lb (115 kg). The aircraft has a standard empty weight of 248 lb (112 kg). It features a biplane wing arrangement, a single-seat, open cockpit, conventional landing gear and a single engine in tractor configuration.

The aircraft is made from aluminum tubing and covered in Dacron sailcloth. Its 32 ft (9.8 m) span, unstaggered wings employ both interplane struts and cable bracing. The lower wing has less span than the upper wing. The fuselage consists of a single aluminum rectangular 2x3 inch (5 X 8 cm) tube. The standard recommended engine is a Kawasaki 440 snowmobile engine that produces 38 hp (28 kW) and yields a 40 mph (64 km/h) cruise speed along with a rate of climb of 600 feet per minute (3.0 m/s).

== Specifications (PUP) ==
Data from Virtual Ultralight Museum

General characteristics

- Crew: one
- Wingspan: 32 ft (9.8 m)
- Wing area: 160 sq ft (15 m^{2})
- Empty weight: 248 lb (112 kg)
- Powerplant: 1 × Kawasaki 440 twin cylinder two-stroke snowmobile engine, 38 hp (28 kW)

Performance

- Cruise speed: 40 mph (64 km/h, 35 kn)
- Stall speed: 28 mph (45 km/h, 24 kn)
- Rate of climb: 600 ft/min (3.0 m/s)
