= 2si 540 =

I-2 piston aircraft engine

2si 540 & 500
- Type: Two-stroke aircraft engine
- National origin: United States
- Manufacturer: 2si

The 2si 540 and 2si 500 are a family of in-line twin-cylinder, liquid-cooled, two-stroke, dual ignition, aircraft engines that were designed for ultralight aircraft.

The basic engine was originally designed and produced by JLO-Motorenwerke of Germany and was later acquired by the AMW Cuyuna Engine Company of Beaufort, South Carolina and marketed under the Cuyuna brand name. Later the engine was marketed by Cuyuna under the Two Stroke International (2si) brand. Cuyuna no longer markets engines for aircraft use although the 540 is still in production as a sport vehicle engine.

== Development ==
The 540 is a conventional twin-cylinder engine that weighs 90 lb (41 kg) in its L70 aircraft version. The engine features dual capacitor discharge ignition (single in the sport vehicle version), reed valve porting, tuned exhaust system, two slide venturi-type carburetors, liquid cooling, fuel pump, a cast iron cylinder liner, ball, needle and roller bearings throughout. The aircraft version was offered with an optional gearbox reduction system. Starting is electric starter or recoil starter.

The 500L85 is a special engine that was developed from the 540, by reducing the cylinder bore from 75 mm (2.953 in) to 72 mm (2.835 in). This was done to reduce the displacement to under 500 cc and allow the engine to be used for Formula 500 auto racing.

== Variants ==
500L-85
Gasoline sport vehicle engine for Formula 500 auto racing. Dual carburetors, 83 hp (62 kW) at 8000 rpm, still in production.
540-L70
Gasoline aircraft engine, dual carburetors, 70 hp (52 kW) at 7000 rpm, weight 90 lb (41 kg), out of production.
540L-90
Gasoline sport vehicle engine for auto racing, kart and all-terrain vehicle applications. Dual carburetors, 89 hp (66 kW) at 8000 rpm, still in production.

== Applications ==
Aircraft

- RagWing RW8 PT2S

Automotive

- Formula 500

== Specifications (540-L70 aircraft engine) ==
Data from Cliche & 2si

=== General characteristics ===
- Type: Twin-cylinder, two-stroke aircraft engine
- Bore: 75 mm (2.95 in)
- Stroke: 61 mm (2.40 in)
- Displacement: 540 cc (32.95 cu in)
- Length: 17.5 in (444.50 mm)
- Width: 14.0 in (355.60 mm)
- Height: 15.0 in (381.00 mm)
- Dry weight: 90 lb (41 kg)

=== Components ===
- Valvetrain: reed valve porting
- Fuel type: Minimum 92 octane
- Oil system: premixed oil and fuel
- Cooling system: liquid cooled
- Reduction gear: optional gearbox

=== Performance ===
- Power output: 70 hp (52 kW) at 7000 rpm

== See also ==
- List of aircraft engines
- Hirth 3503
- Rotax 582
