= Ultimate Jetwing =

American ultralight trike aircraft

Jetwing

General information
- Type: Ultralight trike
- National origin: United States
- Manufacturer: Ultimate Flight Designs
- Status: Production completed

History
- Introduction date: 1981

The Ultimate Jetwing is an American ultralight trike that was designed and produced by Ultimate Flight Designs of Mounds, Oklahoma. The aircraft was supplied fully assembled.

== Design and development ==
The Jetwing was one of the first trikes to be made commercially available, being introduced in 1981. The initial versions used a single surface Rogallo wing. The type went out of production in the mid-1980s, but was reintroduced by the original manufacturer in the late 1990s, using a much newer wing design, a double-surface Demon wing.

The aircraft was designed to comply with the US FAR 103 Ultralight Vehicles rules, including the category's maximum empty weight of 254 lb (115 kg). The aircraft has a standard empty weight of 217 lb (98 kg). It features a minimalist design, cable-braced hang glider-style high wing, weight-shift controls, a single-seat, open cockpit, tricycle landing gear and a single engine in pusher configuration.

The aircraft is made from bolted-together aluminum tubing, with its wing covered in Dacron sailcloth. Its 165 sq ft (15.3 m^{2}) area Demon wing is supported by a single tube-type kingpost and uses an "A" frame control bar. The landing gear employs large-diameter plastic-rimmed wheels to save weight and has suspension on all three wheels. Mainwheel suspension is of the swing-axle and bungee type, while the nosewheel uses a steel spring. A wide variety of small engines can be used, including the Kawasaki 440 twin-cylinder, two-stroke snowmobile engine.

Because of its light weight and low wing loading the Jetwing is suitable for power-off soaring flight.

== Specifications (Jetwing) ==
Data from Cliche

General characteristics

- Crew: one
- Wing area: 165 sq ft (15.3 m^{2})
- Empty weight: 217 lb (98 kg)
- Gross weight: 480 lb (218 kg)
- Fuel capacity: 5 U.S. gallons (19 L; 4.2 imp gal)
- Powerplant: 1 × Kawasaki 440 twin cylinder, two-stroke snowmobile engine

Performance

- Cruise speed: 35 mph (56 km/h, 30 kn)
- Stall speed: 23 mph (37 km/h, 20 kn)
- Rate of climb: 500 ft/min (2.5 m/s)
