= Goldwing Ltd Goldwing =

American ultralight airplane

Goldwing

General information
- Type: Ultralight aircraft
- National origin: United States
- Manufacturer: Goldwing Ltd
- Designer: Craig Catto and Brian Glenn
- Status: Production completed

History
- Introduction date: 1979

The Goldwing Ltd Goldwing is an American ultralight aircraft that was designed by Craig Catto and Brian Glenn and produced by Goldwing Ltd. The aircraft was supplied as a complete factory-built aircraft only and no kits or plans were offered.

== Design and development ==
The aircraft was first flown before the US FAR 103 Ultralight Vehicles rules were introduced and the early versions of the Goldwing did not meet the category's maximum empty weight of 254 lb (115 kg) or its maximum speed requirement of 63 mph (101 km/h). Later models were made lighter and slower to fit FAR 103. The Goldwing UL model has a standard empty weight of 252 lb (114 kg). It features a cantilever mid-wing, canard, a single-seat, open cockpit, tricycle landing gear and a single engine in pusher configuration.

The aircraft is made from molded fiberglass epoxy composites, including Kevlar, carbon-fiber-reinforced polymer and high-density foam. Its 30 ft (9.1 m) span wing is built with a carbon epoxy spar, with the rest of the wing built from foam and covered with doped aircraft fabric covering. The wing features tip rudders and ailerons combined with spoilers for roll control. Pitch is controlled by the canard surface. The landing gear includes laminated fiberglass main gear legs and a steerable nosewheel. The aft-mounted powerplant was a 30 hp (22 kW) Kawasaki 440, 30 hp (22 kW) Cuyuna 430R or a 28 hp (21 kW) Rotax 277. The Goldwing has a 16:1 glide ratio.

In flight the aircraft is reported to be very pitch-sensitive.

== Variants ==
Goldwing ST
Initial version; too heavy and fast for the US FAR 103 ultralight category.
Goldwing UL
Lightened version, with a standard empty weight of 252 lb (114 kg) that conforms to US FAR 103 requirements.

== Specifications (Goldwing UL) ==
Data from Cliche

General characteristics

- Crew: one
- Wingspan: 30 ft (9.1 m)
- Wing area: 140 sq ft (13 m^{2})
- Empty weight: 252 lb (114 kg)
- Gross weight: 540 lb (245 kg)
- Fuel capacity: 3 U.S. gallons (11 L; 2.5 imp gal)
- Powerplant: 1 × Kawasaki 440 , 30 hp (22 kW)

Performance

- Cruise speed: 60 mph (97 km/h, 52 kn)
- Stall speed: 25 mph (40 km/h, 22 kn)
- Never exceed speed: 70 mph (110 km/h, 61 kn)
- Service ceiling: 10,000 ft (3,000 m)
- g limits: +6/-4.5
- Maximum glide ratio: 16:1
- Rate of climb: 600 ft/min (3.0 m/s)
