= Theiss UAV Solutions =

American aircraft manufacturer

- Company type: Privately held company
- Industry: Aerospace
- Founded: 1991
- Headquarters: Salem, Ohio, United States
- Key people: President - Rachel Theiss; Vice President - Shawn Theiss
- Products: Kit aircraft, UAVs
- Website: www.theissuav.com

Theiss UAV Solutions, formerly known as Theiss Aviation, is an American aircraft manufacturer based in Salem, Ohio. The company specializes in the design and manufacture of unmanned aerial vehicles and at one time produced ultralight aircraft in the form of kits for amateur construction.

The president is Rachel Theiss and vice president is Shawn Theiss.

== History ==
The company was formed in 1991 to produce ultralight aircraft kits using a new inexpensive, lightweight construction technique. The company produced two 1930s-style replica designs for the homebuilt market, the Theiss Speedster and the Theiss Sportster, which was introduced in 1998.

As a result of these designs in 1998 the company was approached by the head of the Tactical Electronic Warfare Division's Offboard Countermeasures Vehicle Research Section, United States Naval Research Laboratory to produce UAVs for the US Navy. This resulted in the design of the Theiss Tarzan, which entered Naval service as the Dakota II.

Former company logo

The company stopped working on manned general aviation aircraft to concentrate entirely on UAVs. Rebranded in 2015, the company is now known as Theiss UAV Solutions, LLC. The company produces a series of UAVs, including the Theiss NIRV (Nature Inspired Reconnaissance Vehicle) that is designed to resemble a soaring bird to conduct covert reconnaissance in urban and rural areas, with models that resemble a vulture, gull and hawk. The company also designs custom UAVs for customers.

== Aircraft ==
Summary of aircraft built by Theiss Aviation
Model name	First flight	Number built	Type
Theiss Speedster		at least two	Single seat ultralight biplane
Theiss Sportster	1998	at least one	Single seat ultralight biplane
Theiss Tarzan	1998		UAV
Theiss NIRV			small bird-like UAV
Theiss Ferret			small UAV
Theiss Super Ferret			small UAV
Theiss TIC			micro UAV
