= RagWing RW9 Motor Bipe =

Family of single seat, single engine ultralight aircraft

General information
- Type: Ultralight aircraft
- National origin: United States
- Manufacturer: Ragwing Aircraft Designs
- Designer: Roger Mann
- Status: Plans available
- Number built: 1 (RW9 - January 1999)

History
- First flight: 1995

The RagWing RW9 Motor Bipe is a family of single seat, open-frame fuselage, open-cockpit, single engine ultralight aircraft designed by Roger Mann and sold as plans by RagWing Aircraft Designs for amateur construction.

== Design and development ==
The RW9 was designed as an FAR 103 Ultralight Vehicles compliant biplane that would have an empty weight within that category's 254 lb (115 kg) empty weight limit. The RW9 achieves its light weight in part due to its completely open-frame tube fuselage.

The RW9's wings are constructed entirely from wood and covered with aircraft fabric. The fuselage is a fastened aluminum tube truss construction. The landing gear is of conventional configuration. The aircraft's installed power range is 22 to 52 hp (16 to 39 kW) and the standard engine is the 38 hp (28 kW) Kawasaki 440A installed in tractor configuration. The 35 hp (26 kW) 2si 460 has also been used.

The RW9 is available only as plans and reported construction time is 150–175 hours.

The same basic airframe design was also used to produce the parasol wing RagWing RW16 Aerial.

== Variants ==
RW9 Motor Bipe
Open-frame fuselage, open-cockpit ultralight biplane first flown in 1995 and powered by a 38 hp (28 kW) Kawasaki 440A or a 35 hp (26 kW) 2si 460.
RW16 Aerial
Open-frame fuselage, open-cockpit ultralight parasol wing aircraft, powered by a 35 hp (26 kW) Kawasaki 340.

== Specifications (RW9) ==
Data from Kitplanes, Purdy and RagWing

General characteristics

- Crew: one
- Length: 16 ft 0 in (4.88 m)
- Wingspan: 18 ft 0 in (5.49 m)
- Height: 5 ft 6 in (1.68 m)
- Wing area: 120 sq ft (11 m^{2})
- Empty weight: 225 lb (102 kg)
- Gross weight: 525 lb (238 kg)
- Fuel capacity: 5 US gallons (19 litres)
- Powerplant: 1 × 2si 460 twin cylinder two stroke aircraft engine, 35 hp (26 kW)
- Propellers: 2-bladed wooden

Performance

- Cruise speed: 60 mph (97 km/h, 52 kn)
- Stall speed: 26 mph (42 km/h, 23 kn)
- Never exceed speed: 95 mph (153 km/h, 83 kn)
- Range: 125 mi (201 km, 109 nmi)
- Service ceiling: 10,000 ft (3,000 m)
- Rate of climb: 750 ft/min (3.8 m/s)

== See also ==
Aircraft of comparable role, configuration, and era

- ISON Airbike
