= Long Low-Wing Longster =

American aircraft designed by Leslie Long

Low-Wing Longster
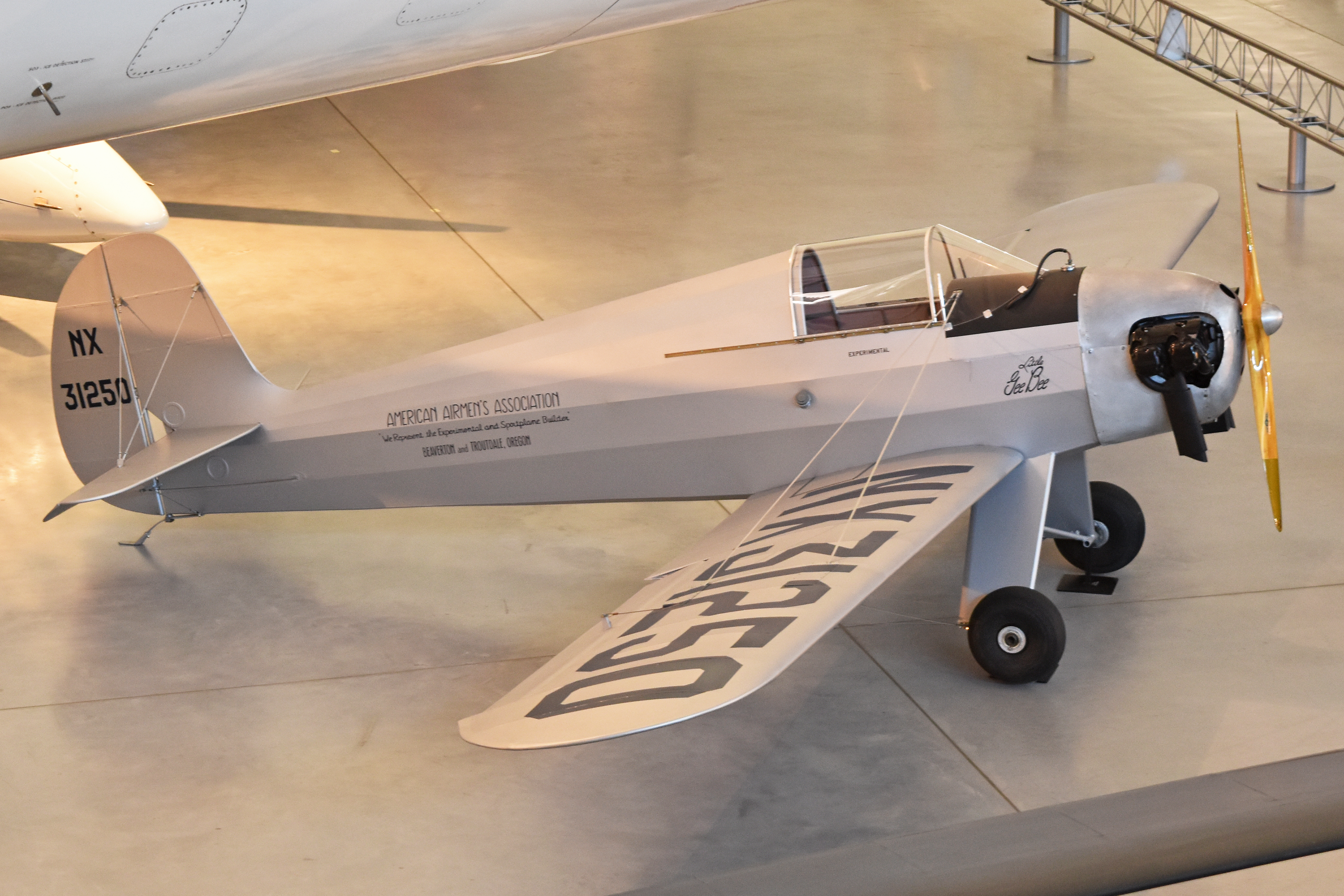
- Leslie Long’s Low Wing Longster variant, "Little Gee Bee," at the Steven F. Udvar-Hazy Center, Chantilly, Virginia

General information
- Type: Homebuilt aircraft
- National origin: United States
- Designer: Leslie Long

The Long Low-Wing Longster is an American aircraft that was designed by Leslie Long, for homebuilt construction.

== Design and development ==
The Low-Wing Longster is a single place, wire braced, low wing, open cockpit aircraft with conventional landing gear. The lower wing wire bracing is connected to the landing gear. The root wing ribs are oversized to create a smooth wing to fuselage fillet.

The aircraft was the last in a series of homebuilt aircraft designs from Les Long. In 1935, the American Bureau of Aviation restricted homebuilt construction of aircraft. A small group of Oregon-based homebuilders were the last hold-outs. The Private Flying Association was developed to promote experimental aircraft and they made the Longster the official aircraft design.

Tom Story's later airplanes, and Peter Bowers’ Fly Baby design were directly attributed to Les’ low wing, wire braced airplane design.

== Operational history ==
In 1947, a 65 hp (48 kW) variant called the "Little Gee Bee" was built Tom Story and Lee Eyerly. It was flown by George Bogardus from Oregon to Washington D.C. to demonstrate to the C.A.A. that homebuilt aircraft were safe and restrictions should be lifted on building them.

== Specifications (Low-Wing Longster) ==
Data from Air Progress

General characteristics

- Crew: 1
- Wingspan: 31 ft 6 in (9.60 m)
- Empty weight: 340 lb (154 kg)
- Gross weight: 575 lb (261 kg)
- Powerplant: 1 × Aeronca E-107 Horizontally Opposed Piston, 26 hp (19 kW)

Performance

- Maximum speed: 78 kn (90 mph, 140 km/h)
- Cruise speed: 65 kn (75 mph, 121 km/h)
- Service ceiling: 15,000 ft (4,600 m)
- Rate of climb: 800 ft/min (4.1 m/s)

== See also ==
Aircraft of comparable role, configuration, and era

- Bowers Fly Baby
