= RagWing RW4 Midwing Sport =

Single engine ultralight aircraft

General information
- Type: Ultralight aircraft
- National origin: United States
- Manufacturer: Ragwing Aircraft Designs
- Designer: Roger Mann
- Status: Plans available
- Number built: 3 (January 1999)

History
- First flight: 1994
- Developed from: RagWing RW1 Ultra-Piet

The RagWing RW4 Midwing Sport is a single seat, strut-braced mid wing, single engine ultralight aircraft designed by Roger Mann and sold as plans by RagWing Aircraft Designs for amateur construction.

== Design and development ==
The RW4 was derived from the high-wing RagWing RW1 Ultra-Piet as an FAR 103 Ultralight Vehicles compliant aircraft that would have an empty weight within that category's 254 lb (115 kg) empty weight limit. The RW4 was designed to be an ultralight replica of the classic 1931 vintage Church Midwing Sport Monoplane pylon racer.

The RW4 airframe is constructed entirely from wood and covered with aircraft fabric. The landing gear is of conventional configuration with bungee suspension. As on the original Church design the RW4 has a gap between the wing and fuselage to allow the pilot to see downwards. The aircraft's installed power range is 20 to 48 hp (15 to 36 kW) and the standard engine was originally the 30 hp (22 kW) Kawasaki 340. The 35 hp (26 kW) Half VW four-stroke engine, 28 hp (21 kW) Rotax 277 two-stroke and 28 hp (21 kW) 2si 430 two-stroke have also been used.

Partial kits and construction kits were available in the late 1990s, but today the aircraft is offered only in the form of plans. Reported construction time is 400–600 hours, although the designer claims 350 hours.

== Specifications (RW4) ==
Data from Kitplanes, Purdy and RagWing

General characteristics

- Crew: one
- Length: 16 ft 0 in (4.88 m)
- Wingspan: 26 ft 8 in (8.13 m)
- Height: 4 ft 6 in (1.37 m)
- Wing area: 117 sq ft (10.9 m^{2})
- Empty weight: 235 lb (107 kg)
- Gross weight: 550 lb (249 kg)
- Fuel capacity: 5 US gallons (19 litres)
- Powerplant: 1 × 2si 430 twin cylinder two stroke aircraft engine, 28 hp (21 kW)
- Propellers: 2-bladed wooden

Performance

- Cruise speed: 65 mph (105 km/h, 56 kn)
- Stall speed: 26 mph (42 km/h, 23 kn)
- Never exceed speed: 95 mph (153 km/h, 83 kn)
- Range: 125 mi (201 km, 109 nmi)
- Service ceiling: 10,000 ft (3,000 m)
- Rate of climb: 600 ft/min (3.0 m/s)
