= RagWing RW22 Tiger Moth =

American homebuilt aircraft

General information
- Type: Homebuilt aircraft
- National origin: United States
- Manufacturer: Ragwing Aircraft Designs
- Designer: Roger Mann
- Status: Plans available
- Number built: 1 (December 2000)

History
- Introduction date: 2000
- First flight: June 1999
- Developed from: de Havilland Tiger Moth

The RagWing RW22 Tiger Moth is a two-seats-in-tandem, biplane, conventional landing gear, single engine homebuilt aircraft designed by Roger Mann and sold as plans by RagWing Aircraft Designs for amateur construction.

The RW22 is an 80% scale replica of the de Havilland Tiger Moth and was developed using the original Tiger Moth design as a guide.

== Design and development ==
The RW22 was designed for the US experimental homebuilt aircraft category and was first flown in June 1999. It also qualifies as an Experimental Light-sport aircraft in the USA.

The airframe is constructed from wood and tube and covered with aircraft fabric. The landing gear is of conventional configuration. The aircraft's nominal installed power range is 50 to 100 hp (37 to 75 kW) and the standard engine is the 70 hp (52 kW) 2si 690, although the 60 hp (45 kW) HKS 700E, 50 hp (37 kW) Rotax 503 and the 80 hp (60 kW) Rotax 912UL engine have also been used.

The RW22 was originally available as a complete quick-build kit, less only the engine, but today is only offered as plans and the designer estimates it will take 600 hours to complete the aircraft.

== Specifications (RW22) ==
Data from Kitplanes and RagWing

General characteristics

- Crew: one
- Capacity: one passenger
- Length: 19 ft 0 in (5.79 m)
- Wingspan: 23 ft 0 in (7.01 m)
- Height: 7 ft 6 in (2.29 m)
- Wing area: 161 sq ft (15.0 m^{2})
- Empty weight: 490 lb (222 kg)
- Gross weight: 1,050 lb (476 kg)
- Fuel capacity: 10 US gallons (38 litres)
- Powerplant: 1 × Rotax 503 twin cylinder two stroke aircraft engine, 50 hp (37 kW)
- Propellers: 2-bladed wooden

Performance

- Cruise speed: 80 mph (130 km/h, 70 kn)
- Stall speed: 35 mph (56 km/h, 30 kn)
- Never exceed speed: 110 mph (180 km/h, 96 kn)
- Range: 250 mi (400 km, 220 nmi)
- Service ceiling: 10,000 ft (3,000 m)
- Rate of climb: 750 ft/min (3.8 m/s)

Aircraft of comparable role, configuration, and era

- Fisher R-80 Tiger Moth
