= Theiss Sportster =

American homebuilt aircraft

Sportster

General information
- Type: Homebuilt aircraft
- National origin: United States
- Manufacturer: Theiss Aviation
- Status: Production completed

History
- Introduction date: 1998

The Theiss Sportster is an American homebuilt aircraft that was designed and produced by Theiss Aviation of Salem, Ohio, introduced in 1998. When it was available the aircraft was supplied as a kit for amateur construction.

== Design and development ==
The aircraft features a biplane layout, a single-seat, open cockpit, fixed conventional landing gear and a single engine in tractor configuration. The Sportster was designed to comply with the US FAR 103 Ultralight Vehicles rules, including the category's maximum empty weight of 254 lb (115 kg). The aircraft has a standard empty weight of 252 lb (114 kg). It was intended to resemble biplane of the 1930s and mounts its upper wing not on cabane struts, but on a central pylon that has a tunnel to allow the pilot forward vision.

The aircraft is made with mixed construction, from aluminum, steel, wood and foam. Its 17.5 ft (5.3 m) span wings have a total wing area of 82 sq ft (7.6 m^{2}). The cockpit width is 20 in (51 cm).

The aircraft has a typical empty weight of 252 lb (114 kg) and a gross weight of 460 lb (210 kg), giving a useful load of 208 lb (94 kg). With full fuel of 5 U.S. gallons (19 L; 4.2 imp gal) the payload for the pilot and baggage is 178 lb (81 kg).

The manufacturer estimated the construction time from the supplied kit as 400 hours.

The company later turned its attention to produce unmanned aerial vehicles for the US Navy and no longer produces manned aircraft.

== Operational history ==
By 1998 the company reported that two Sportsters had been completed and were flying. Customer kits were forecast to start shipping in March 1998.

== Specifications (Sportster) ==
Data from AeroCrafter

General characteristics

- Crew: one
- Length: 14 ft 0 in (4.27 m)
- Wingspan: 17 ft 6 in (5.33 m)
- Wing area: 82 sq ft (7.6 m^{2})
- Empty weight: 252 lb (114 kg)
- Gross weight: 460 lb (209 kg)
- Fuel capacity: 5 U.S. gallons (19 L; 4.2 imp gal)
- Powerplant: 1 × two stroke aircraft engine
- Propellers: 2-bladed wooden, fixed pitch

Performance

- Wing loading: 5.6 lb/sq ft (27 kg/m^{2})
