= RagWing RW11 Rag-A-Bond =

Two-seat, single engine homebuilt aircraft

General information
- Type: Homebuilt aircraft
- National origin: United States
- Manufacturer: Ragwing Aircraft Designs
- Designer: Roger Mann
- Status: Plans available
- Number built: 4 (1998)

History
- Introduction date: 1996
- First flight: 1996

The RagWing RW11 Rag-A-Bond is a two-seat, high wing, strut-braced, conventional landing gear, single engine homebuilt aircraft designed by Roger Mann and sold as plans by RagWing Aircraft Designs for amateur construction.

The RW11 is a replica of the Piper PA-15 Vagabond.

== Design and development ==
The RW11 was designed for the US experimental homebuilt aircraft category or as a US FAR 103 Ultralight Vehicles two-seat ultralight trainer and first flown in 1996.

The airframe is constructed entirely from wood and covered with aircraft fabric. The landing gear is of conventional configuration with bungee suspension. The cabin is internally 42 in (107 cm) wide and drooped STOL style wingtips are optional. The aircraft's installed power range is 52 to 100 hp (39 to 75 kW) and the standard engine is the 52 hp (39 kW) Rotax 503, although the 70 hp (52 kW) 2si 690 and 73 hp (54 kW) Subaru EA-81 engines have also been used.

The RW11 is only offered as plans and the designer estimates it will take 500 hours to complete the aircraft.

== Specifications (RW11) ==
Data from Kitplanes, Purdy and RagWing

General characteristics

- Crew: one
- Capacity: one passenger
- Length: 18 ft 0 in (5.49 m)
- Wingspan: 28 ft 0 in (8.53 m)
- Height: 6 ft 6 in (1.98 m)
- Wing area: 123.8 sq ft (11.50 m^{2})
- Empty weight: 420 lb (191 kg)
- Gross weight: 850 lb (386 kg)
- Fuel capacity: 10 US gallons (38 litres)
- Powerplant: 1 × Rotax 503 twin cylinder two stroke aircraft engine, 52 hp (39 kW)
- Propellers: 2-bladed wooden

Performance

- Cruise speed: 78 mph (126 km/h, 68 kn)
- Stall speed: 38 mph (61 km/h, 33 kn)
- Never exceed speed: 115 mph (185 km/h, 100 kn)
- Range: 280 mi (450 km, 240 nmi)
- Service ceiling: 9,500 ft (2,900 m)
- Rate of climb: 525 ft/min (2.67 m/s)

Data from Kitplanes, Purdy and RagWing

General characteristics

- Crew: one
- Capacity: one passenger
- Length: 18 ft 0 in (5.49 m)
- Wingspan: 28 ft 0 in (8.53 m)
- Height: 6 ft 6 in (1.98 m)
- Wing area: 123.8 sq ft (11.50 m^{2})
- Empty weight: 420 lb (191 kg)
- Gross weight: 850 lb (386 kg)
- Fuel capacity: 10 US gallons (38 litres)
- Powerplant: 1 × Rotax 503 The single place version can use the Rotax 503 but the two place version calls for 65hp to 100hp twin cylinder two stroke aircraft engine, 52 hp (39 kW)
- Propellers: 2-bladed wooden

Performance

- Cruise speed: 78 mph (126 km/h, 68 kn)
- Stall speed: 38 mph (61 km/h, 33 kn)
- Never exceed speed: 115 mph (185 km/h, 100 kn)
- Range: 280 mi (450 km, 240 nmi)
- Service ceiling: 9,500 ft (2,900 m)
- Rate of climb: 525 ft/min (2.67 m/s)

Aircraft of comparable role, configuration, and era

- Piper PA-15
- Wag-Aero Wag-a-Bond
