= Solution selling =

Type and style of sales and selling methodology

Solution selling is a type and style of sales and selling methodology. Solution selling has a salesperson or sales team use a sales process that is a problem-led (rather than product-led) approach to determine if and how a change in a product could bring specific improvements that are desired by the customer. The term "solution" implies that the proposed new product produces improved outcomes and successfully resolves the customer problem. Business-to-business sales (B2B) organizations are more likely to use solution selling and similar sales methodologies.

== Origins of solution selling and terminology ==
Frank Watts developed the sales process dubbed "solution selling" in 1975. Watts perfected his method at Wang Laboratories. He began teaching solution selling as an independent consultant in 1982. He presented his sales process as a one-day workshop to Xerox Corporation in 1982. By 1983 Electronics magazine would portray solution selling as "an unmistakable trend in the distribution of systems-related products". In a 1984 account Dick Heiser could look back to IBM's pre-1975 "solution sale" methodology.

Mike Bosworth founded a sales training organization known as Solution Selling in 1983, based on his experiences at Xerox Corporation (the Huthwaite International SPIN (Situation, Problem, Implication, Need-payoff) selling pilot project) and began licensing affiliates in 1988. With intellectual-property contributions from his affiliate network, Bosworth's methodology continued to evolve through the years. He sold the intellectual property in 1999 to one of his original affiliates, Keith M. Eades.

While 'solution selling' has become a generic term in many sales and selling organizations, Solution Selling as a brand denotes distinct characteristics.

== Solution selling in management contexts ==
The advent of solution selling may have an impact on business models and on organization practices. Eades and Kear discuss solution-centric organizations and the focal role of solution sales in such environments. Robert J Calvin compares some of the financial implications of various type of sales: transactional sales, value-added sales, solution sales, and feature/benefit sales. Robert L Jolles proposed that, among managers and salespeople, a chosen solution is not always the best solution.

== See also ==
- Presales
