= RagWing RW2 Special I =

Family of biplane, single engine homebuilt aircraft

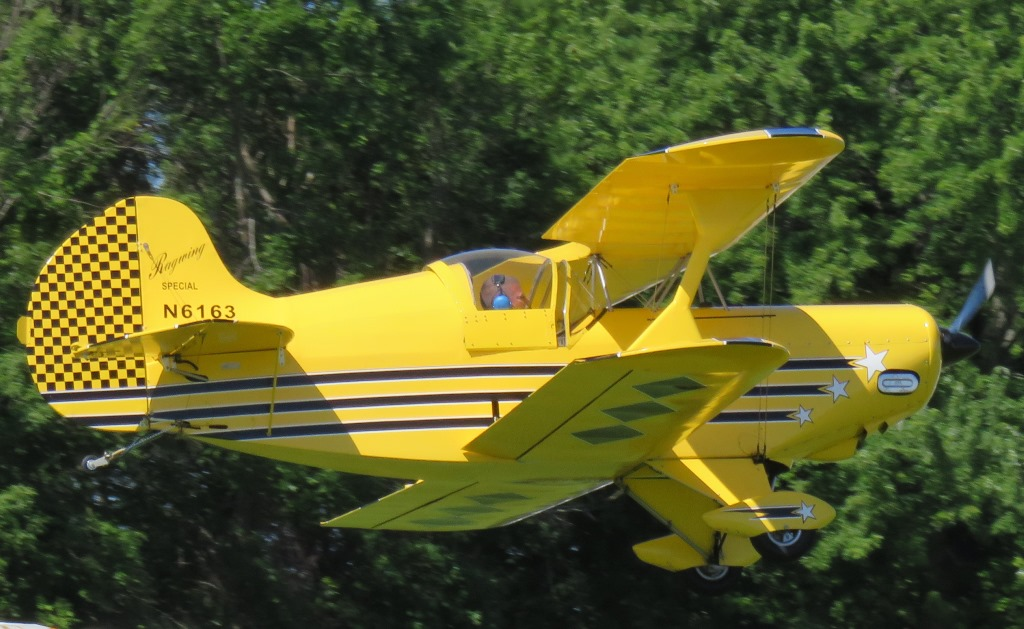

General information
- Type: Homebuilt aircraft
- National origin: United States
- Manufacturer: Ragwing Aircraft Designs
- Designer: Roger Mann
- Status: Plans available
- Number built: 5 (RW2, December 2007); 2 (RW26, December 2007)

The RagWing RW2 Special I is a family of biplane, single engine homebuilt aircraft designed by Roger Mann and sold as plans by RagWing Aircraft Designs for amateur construction.

== Design and development ==
The RW2 was designed as a single seat lightweight Pitts Special S-1 replica for the US experimental homebuilt aircraft category. The RW26 was added later and is a replica of the Pitts S-2 two-seater.

As with many RagWing designs the RW2 and 26 feature airframes constructed entirely from wood and covered with aircraft fabric. The airframe uses a Pratt truss. The RW2 has an optional 4130 steel tube fuselage. The landing gear is of conventional configuration with bungee suspension. The wings are detachable for storage or ground transport.

The RW2's installed power range is 35 to 65 hp (26 to 48 kW) and the standard engines are the 38 hp (28 kW) Kawasaki 440A and the 45 hp (34 kW) 2si 460, although the 40 hp (30 kW) Rotax 447 has also been used. The RW26's installed power range is 52 to 100 hp (39 to 75 kW) and the standard engines are the 52 hp (39 kW) Rotax 503 and the 100 hp (75 kW) Rotax 912S.

In the early 2000s kits were available for construction, but today the aircraft are available only as plans. The designer estimates it will take 400 hours to complete either aircraft and claims that the RW2 can be built for US$5000, including a new engine.

== Variants ==
RW2 Special
Single seat biplane
RW26 Special II
Two seats in tandem biplane

== Specifications (RW2 Special) ==
Data from Kitplanes, Purdy and RagWing

General characteristics

- Crew: one
- Length: 14 ft 8 in (4.47 m)
- Wingspan: 18 ft 0 in (5.49 m)
- Height: 5 ft 5 in (1.65 m)
- Wing area: 120 sq ft (11 m^{2})
- Empty weight: 278 lb (126 kg)
- Gross weight: 550 lb (249 kg)
- Fuel capacity: 5 US gallons (19 litres)
- Powerplant: 1 × Kawasaki 440A twin cylinder two stroke aircraft engine, 38 hp (28 kW)
- Propellers: 2-bladed wooden

Performance

- Cruise speed: 70 mph (110 km/h, 61 kn)
- Stall speed: 30 mph (48 km/h, 26 kn)
- Never exceed speed: 125 mph (201 km/h, 109 kn)
- Range: 125 mi (201 km, 109 nmi)
- Service ceiling: 10,000 ft (3,000 m)
- Rate of climb: 750 ft/min (3.8 m/s)
- Wing loading: 4.6 lb/sq ft (22 kg/m^{2})

== See also ==
Aircraft of comparable role, configuration, and era

- Fisher FP-404
- Murphy Renegade
