= Church Midwing JC-1 =

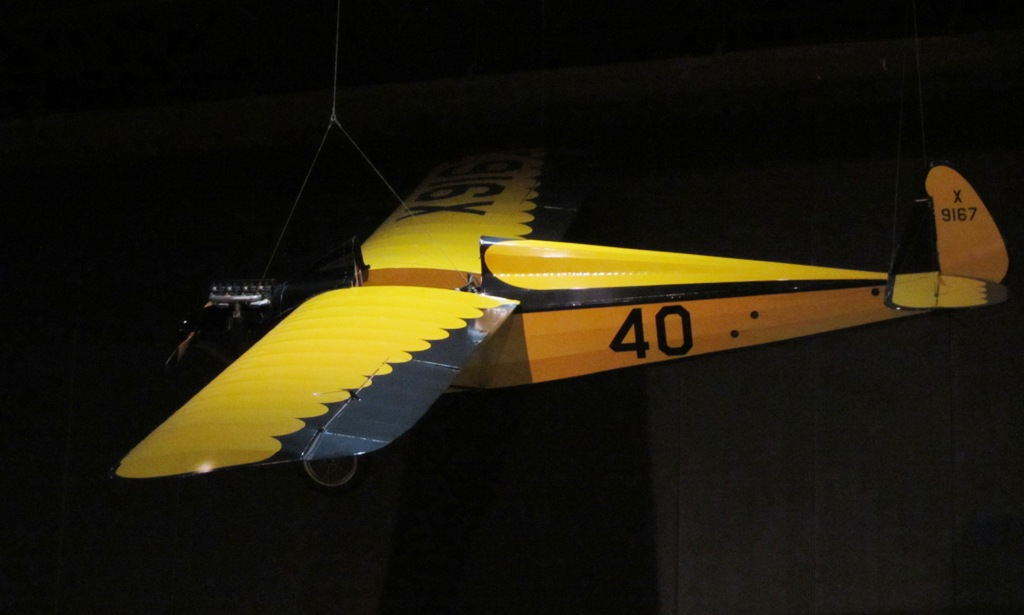
- A Church Midwing on display

General information
- Type: Racing aircraft
- National origin: United States of America
- Manufacturer: Church Airplane & Mfg Co
- Designer: James Church

History
- First flight: 1928
- Developed from: Heath Parasol

The Church Midwing JC-1, a.k.a. Church Mid-Wing Sport, is a midwing racing aircraft designed by James Church using the fuselage of a Heath aircraft.

== Design and development ==
The Church Midwing was designed to be an affordable homebuilt aircraft. Church marketed kits for $190.

The open cockpit midwing aircraft featured windows in the wings for visibility downward.

== Operational history ==
Built to be a pylon racer, a Church Midwing placed third in the 1930 National Air Races. The Church used many parts from the Heath Parasol design. In 1931 the prototype was modified with an installation of a 38 hp inline air-cooled Church designed engine and a cowling modification to accommodate the cylinders protruding upward in the pilot's line of sight. A 1931 advertisement placed by Heath in Popular Mechanics extolled the virtues of its first-place finish with its parasol configuration, compared to the Church's midwing planform.

== Variants ==
RW4 RagWing Midwing Sport Replica
An ultralight replica of the JC-1, produced by RagWing Aircraft Designs.
Church Racer
Essentially a Midwing fitted with a model J-3 46hp Church Marathon engine.

== Aircraft on Display ==
- EAA AirVenture Museum, Oshkosh, Wisconsin - 1 A Basket case 5 year restoration completed in 1971 by Gene Chase, outfitted with a Heath-Henderson B-4 engine.

== Specifications (Church Midwing JC-1) ==
Data from EAA

General characteristics

- Length: 16 ft 9 in (5.11 m)
- Wingspan: 26 ft 8 in (8.13 m)
- Wing area: 110 sq ft (10 m^{2})
- Empty weight: 367 lb (166 kg)
- Gross weight: 584 lb (265 kg)
- Fuel capacity: 4.5 Gal (17 litres)
- Powerplant: 1 × Heath-Henderson B-4 Inline 4 cylinder, 27 hp (20 kW)

Performance

- Maximum speed: 78 kn (90 mph, 140 km/h)
- Cruise speed: 61 kn (70 mph, 110 km/h)
- Stall speed: 24 kn (28 mph, 45 km/h)

== See also ==
Aircraft of comparable role, configuration, and era

- Troyer Sportsplane VX
