= 2si =

Defunct American engine manufacturer

2 Stroke International
- Company type: Private company
- Industry: Engine manufacturing
- Fate: Out of business 2014
- Headquarters: Beaufort, South Carolina, United States
- Products: Two-stroke engines
- Parent: AMW Cuyuna Engine Company
- Website: www.2si.com

2si, or 2 Stroke International, was an American engine manufacturer located in Beaufort, South Carolina. The company was a wholly owned subsidiary of the AMW Cuyuna Engine Company, formerly known as the Cuyuna Development Company.

The company acquired a line of two-stroke engines that were originally designed and produced by JLO of Germany and marketed them under the Cuyuna brand name for snowmobile and later ultralight aircraft use. Later Cuyuna formed a subsidiary Two Stroke International, commonly known as 2si, to produce and market the engine line. Cuyuna ended selling engines for aircraft use, but instead switched to marketing them only for industrial, marine, auto racing, kart and all-terrain vehicle applications.

The company seems to have gone out of business in 2014.

== Engines ==
- 215 - aircraft, multifuel, industrial engine
- 230 - aircraft, multifuel, industrial engine
- 340 - aircraft engine
- 430 - aircraft and snowmobile engine
- 460 - aircraft, multifuel, marine, industrial and sport vehicle engine
- 500 - sport vehicle engine
- 540 - aircraft and sport vehicle engine
- 690 - aircraft, marine, industrial engine
- 808 - aircraft engine

== See also ==
- List of aircraft engines
- Hirth
- Rotax
