= Viking Aircraft Viking II =

American powered parachute

Viking II

General information
- Type: Powered parachute
- National origin: United States
- Manufacturer: Viking Aircraft Inc.
- Status: Production completed (2015)
- Number built: At least nine

History
- Manufactured: 2000-2005
- Introduction date: 2000

The Viking Aircraft Viking II is an American powered parachute designed and produced by Viking Aircraft Inc of Panama City Beach, Florida; part of the Viking-series. Now out of production, when it was available the aircraft was supplied complete and ready-to-fly.

The aircraft was introduced in 2000 and production ended when the company went out of business in 2005.

== Design and development ==
The Viking II was designed for the training role, to comply with the U.S. FAR 103 Ultralight Vehicles rules as a two-seat trainer, but also meets the Fédération Aéronautique Internationale microlight category requirements, including the category's maximum gross weight of 450 kg (992 lb). Some were also registered as Experimental aircraft in the U.S. and one as an Experimental - Amateur-built.

The Viking II features a 48.4 m^{2} (521 sq ft) parachute-style wing, two-seats-in-side-by-side configuration, tricycle landing gear and a twin-cylinder 50 hp (37 kW) Rotax 503 engine in pusher configuration. The three-cylinder 70 hp (52 kW) 2si 690-L70 liquid-cooled engine was a factory option.

The aircraft carriage is built from metal tubing with a composite partial cockpit fairing. In flight steering is accomplished via handles that actuate the canopy brakes, creating roll and yaw. On the ground the aircraft has foot pedal-controlled nosewheel steering. The main landing gear incorporates spring rod suspension.

The aircraft has an empty weight of 270 lb (122 kg) and a gross weight of 715 lb (324 kg), giving a useful load of 445 lb (202 kg). With full fuel of 10 U.S. gallons (38 L; 8.3 imp gal) the payload for crew and baggage is 385 lb (175 kg).

The standard day, sea level, no wind, take off with a 50 hp (37 kW) engine is 100 ft (30 m) and the landing roll is 10 ft (3 m).

== Operational history ==
In September 2015 five examples were registered in the United States with the Federal Aviation Administration, although a total of six had been registered at one time.

== Variants ==
The company also produced a single seat version of the Viking II design, which it referred to simply as the "Single-Place". This version mounts a single seat on a narrower cockpit frame, but is otherwise similar.

== Specifications (Viking II) ==
Data from Bertrand and manufacturer

General characteristics

- Crew: one
- Capacity: one passenger
- Wingspan: 38 ft 5 in (11.70 m)
- Wing area: 521 sq ft (48.4 m^{2})
- Aspect ratio: 2.8:1
- Empty weight: 269 lb (122 kg)
- Gross weight: 714 lb (324 kg)
- Fuel capacity: 10 U.S. gallons (38 L; 8.3 imp gal)
- Powerplant: 1 × Rotax 503 twin cylinder, two-stroke, air-cooled aircraft engine, 50 hp (37 kW)
- Propellers: 3-bladed composite, ground adjustable

Performance

- Maximum speed: 33 mph (53 km/h, 29 kn)
- Service ceiling: 12,000 ft (3,700 m)
- Maximum glide ratio: 6:1
- Rate of climb: 1,600 ft/min (8 m/s)
- Rate of sink: 600 ft/min (3.0 m/s)
- Wing loading: 1.4 lb/sq ft (6.7 kg/m^{2})
