= Norman Ralston =

Norman "Swede" William Ralston
- Born: November 28, 1916; Forest Grove, Oregon, U.S.
- Died: November 14, 2007 (aged 90); Providence St. Vincent Medical Center; Portland, Oregon, U.S.
- Occupations: Aviator; Airshow pilot Businessman; Flight instructor
- Spouse: Radah Ardath Ralston
- Children: Dana Jean McCullough; Radah "Sissy" Ardath Bentson; Norman William Ralston Jr. Mary Louise Ralston
- Parent(s): William Grey Ralston and Ester Josephine Mortenson

Norman William Ralston (November 28, 1916 – November 14, 2007) was an American pilot.

== Biography ==
During World War II, Ralston, known as "Swede".

He was a stunt pilot. He became famous for flying an AT-6 Texan through Naval Air Station Tillamook, a World War II blimp hangar, in Tillamook, Oregon. Ralston helped found the Hillsboro Airport. He co-founded the airline company Aero Air.

== Awards ==
- Charles Taylor Master Mechanic Award
- International Council of Air Shows Hall of Fame Award
- Federal Aviation Administration's Wright Brothers Master Pilot Award
