= Viking Aircraft Inc. =

Aircraft manufacturer

- Company type: Privately held company
- Industry: Aerospace
- Founded: 2000
- Defunct: 2005
- Headquarters: Panama City Beach, Florida, United States
- Products: Powered parachutes

Viking Aircraft Inc. was an American aircraft manufacturer based in Panama City Beach, Florida. The company specialized in the design and manufacture of powered parachutes in the form of ready-to-fly aircraft in the US FAR 103 Ultralight Vehicles and the European Fédération Aéronautique Internationale microlight categories.

The company is often confused with Viking Aircraft LLC, which was also once known as Viking Aircraft Inc.

The company seems to have been founded about 2000 and went out of business in 2005.

Viking Aircraft Inc. produced one product, the Viking Aircraft Viking II of which at least six examples were produced. The company also sold a single-seat version of the design, which they referred to as "the single-place".

== Aircraft ==
Summary of aircraft built by Viking Aircraft Inc.
Model name	First flight	Number built	Type
Viking Aircraft Viking II	2000	At least six	Two-seat powered parachute
