= V-STOL Solution =

American ultralight STOL aircraft

Solution

General information
- Type: Ultralight aircraft
- National origin: United States
- Manufacturer: V-STOL Aircraft
- Designer: Dick Turner
- Status: Production completed

History
- Introduction date: 1998

The V-STOL Solution is an American ultralight aircraft that was designed by Dick Turner in 1998 and produced by V-STOL Aircraft. The aircraft was supplied as a kit for amateur construction.

== Design and development ==
The design goal of the Solution was to produce a legal US FAR 103 Ultralight Vehicles regulations compliant single seat ultralight that could be easily converted to a two-seater with the addition of a second seat and a larger engine. FAR Part 103 specifies a maximum empty weight of 254 lb (115 kg) and the Solution has a standard empty weight of 246 lb (112 kg). It features a cable-braced high-wing, a single-seat, open cockpit, conventional landing gear and a single engine in pusher configuration.

The aircraft is made from bolted-together aluminium tubing, with the flying surfaces covered in Dacron sailcloth. Its 33 ft (10.1 m) span wing has a wing area of 183 sq ft (17.0 m^{2}), which is large enough to support a second person. The second seat would be installed behind the first, in tandem, and could be optionally equipped with dual controls.

The pilot is accommodated on an open seat and has conventional three-axis controls in the form of a centre stick and rudder pedals. The standard engine provided for single seat flying was the single cylinder two-stroke Rotax 277 of 28 hp (21 kW), while larger engines could be installed for two-seat operations.

V-STOL Aircraft had the design on the market for only a short period before the company went out of business. Assembly time from the kit is estimated at 50 hours.

== Specifications (Solution single-seat) ==
Data from Cliche and the Virtual Ultralight Museum

General characteristics

- Crew: one
- Wingspan: 33 ft (10 m)
- Wing area: 183 sq ft (17.0 m^{2})
- Empty weight: 246 lb (112 kg)
- Gross weight: 498 lb (226 kg)
- Powerplant: 1 × Rotax 277 single cylinder two-stroke aircraft engine, 28 hp (21 kW)

Performance

- Cruise speed: 45 mph (72 km/h, 39 kn)
- Stall speed: 22 mph (35 km/h, 19 kn)
- Rate of climb: 500 ft/min (2.5 m/s)
- Wing loading: 2.7 lb/sq ft (13 kg/m^{2})
