= Heath-Henderson B-4 =

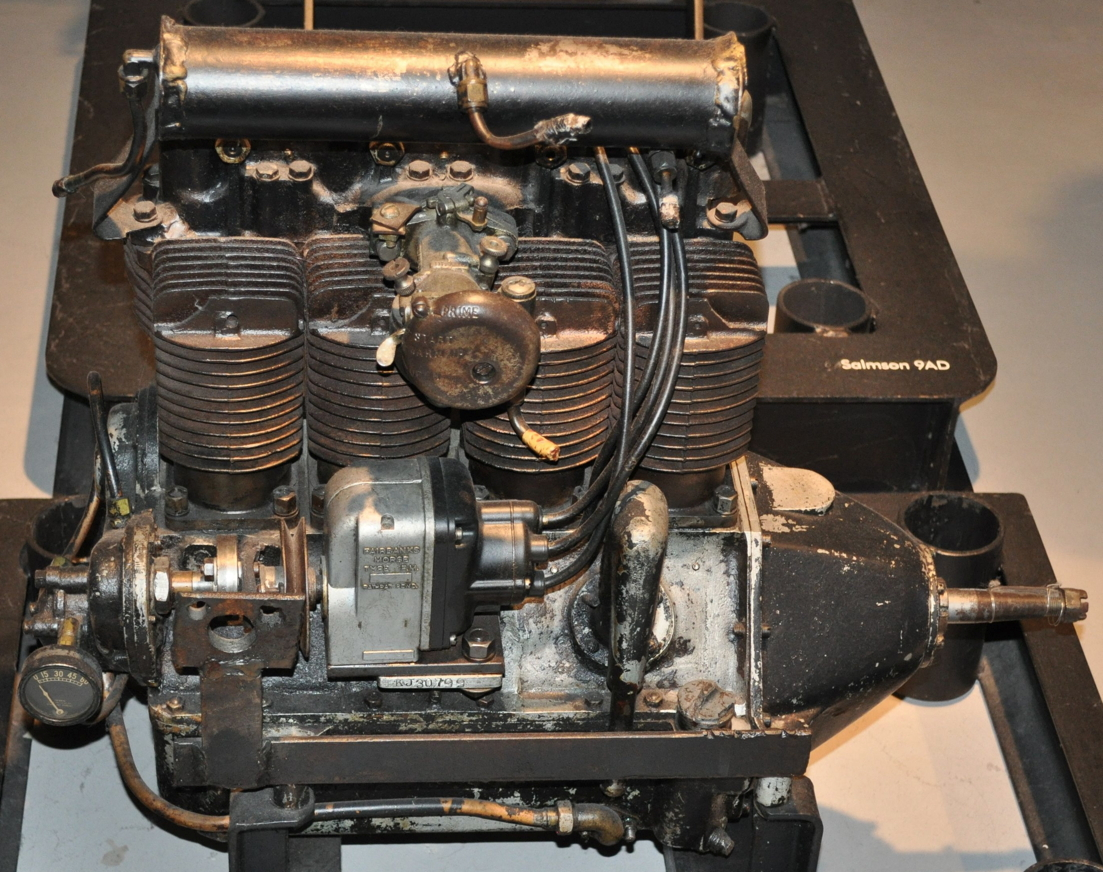
- Heath-Henderson B-4 aircraft engine on display at the Steven F. Udvar-Hazy Center
- Type: Piston aero engine
- National origin: United States
- Manufacturer: Heath-Henderson
- First run: 1927
- Major applications: Heath V Parasol

The Heath-Henderson B-4 engine was a motorcycle piston engine modified for use in aircraft.

"The Heath Airplane Company's Model B-4 was an in-line, four-cylinder, air-cooled Henderson motorcycle engine converted for use in aircraft by modifying the lubrication system and the valves. The B-4 mainly powered the small and economical Heath Parasol monoplane, which Heath sold in kit form for homebuilders in the 1920s and '30s."

"The low-cost, reliable Henderson motorcycle engine was well-suited for the Heath airplane design because it helped make sport flying affordable for many people. Service was simple and economical because parts were cheap and easy to obtain throughout the country."

== Variants ==
- Church Marathon J-3

The Marathon J-3 was a modification of the Heath-Henderson B-4 engine, used for light aircraft in the 1930s, by the Church Airplane and Mfg. Co, primarily for the Church Midwing JC-1. The Marathon J-3 cost $350 in 1932.

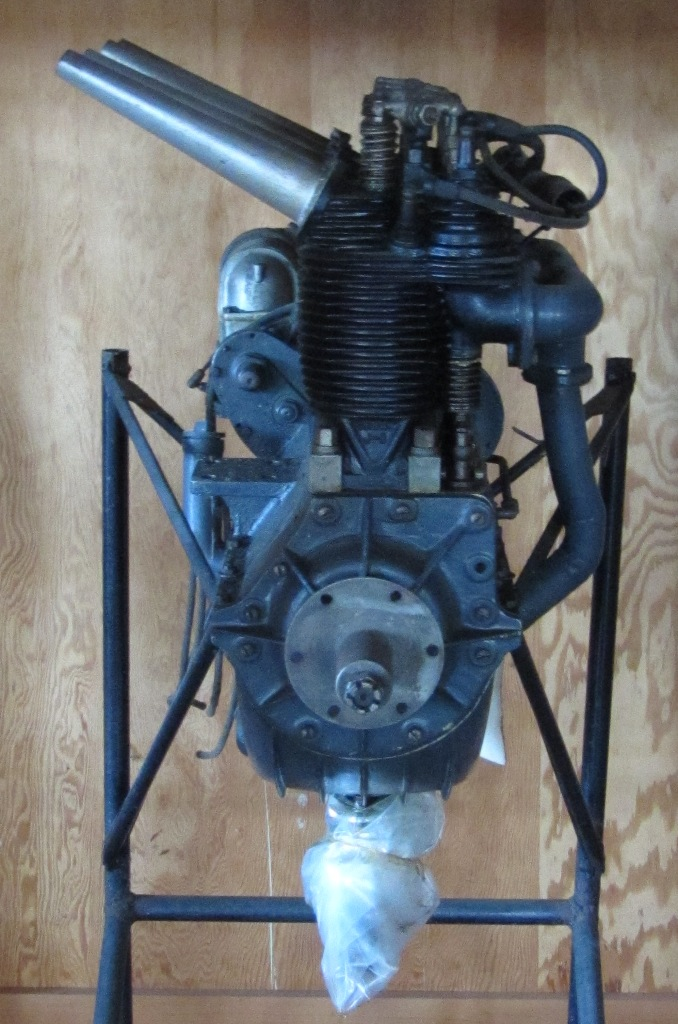
A Church Marathon J-3

== Applications ==
- Church Midwing JC-1
- Doromy Bath Tub
- Heath Parasol

== Engines on display ==
- There is a B-4 on display at the New England Air Museum, Bradley International Airport, Windsor Locks, CT.
- An Heath-Henderson B-4 with a Heath Parasol airplay is on display at the Texas Air Museum – Stinson Chapter, San Antonio, Texas.

== Specifications ==
Data from Jane's all the World's Aircraft 1938

=== General characteristics ===
- Type: 4-cylinder, air-cooled inline piston aircraft engine
- Bore: 2.75 in (70 mm)

(Marathon J-3 - 2.806 in (71 mm))

- Stroke: 3.5 in (89 mm)
- Displacement: 83 cu in (1.4 L)

(Marathon J-3 - 108 cu in (1.77 L))

- Length: 25.25 in (641 mm)
- Width: 14 in (356 mm)
- Height: 25 in (640 mm)
- Dry weight: 109 lb (49.4 kg)

=== Components ===
- Valvetrain: side valves worked by camshaft
- Cooling system: air-cooled

=== Performance ===
- Power output: 30 hp (22 kW) at 3000 rpm

(Marathon J-3 - 46.5 hp (34.7 kW))

- Compression ratio: 4.6:1
