= William E. Upjohn =

American physician

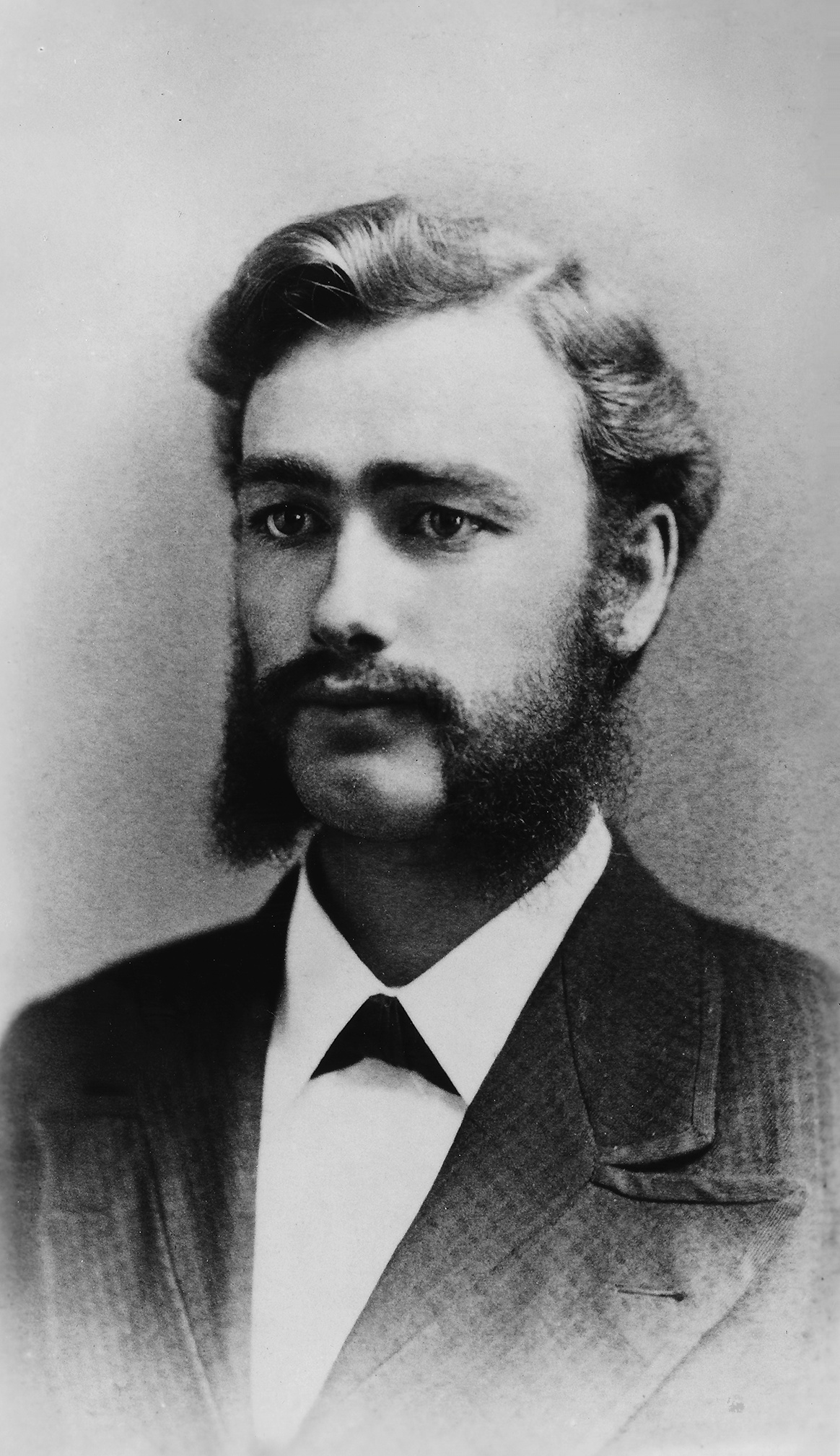
William Erastus Upjohn, c. 1875

William Erastus Upjohn (June 15, 1853 – October 18, 1932) was an American physician and both founder and president of The Upjohn Pharmaceutical Company. He was named Person of the Century by the Kalamazoo, Michigan, newspaper.

== Early life ==
Upjohn was one of twelve children born to Dr. Uriah Upjohn, pioneer doctor, and his wife, Maria Mills Upjohn, in Kalamazoo, Michigan.

In 1875, he graduated from the University of Michigan medical school.

== Career ==
Upjohn practiced medicine for 10 years in Hastings, Michigan.

In his home, Dr. Upjohn experimented with ways to improve the means of administering medicine. He invented the easily digested friable pill, for which he received a patent in 1885. In 1886, he founded The Upjohn Pharmaceutical Company in Kalamazoo to manufacture friable pills and served 40 years as company president.

=== Brook Lodge ===
Upjohn bought a 40-acre (160,000 m^{2}) farm in 1895 that would eventually become the Brook Lodge Hotel & Conference Resort in Augusta, Michigan. One of the buildings on the property was a creamery, which he converted to a summer cottage for his family.

This retreat eventually became his location for private and business entertaining. In 1956, twenty-four years after Dr. Upjohn's death, the Upjohn Company purchased Brook Lodge from the family estate and began its transformation into a conference center for the use of Upjohn employees.

During the time that the creamery was being converted to family living quarters, Dr. Upjohn erected a combination garage and guest house where the Conference Hall now stands. When the Conference Hall was built, the guest house — now the Carriage House — was moved to its present location. In 1910 Brookside Cottage was built by Upjohn for his gardener.

The original landscaping of Brook Lodge included a swimming pool, tennis court, and walking paths. Upjohn also planted thousands of trees and flowers. Though iris were his first love, he turned his attention to peonies. According to varying reports, Dr. Upjohn grew from 400 to 675 varieties of peonies, 40 acres (160,000 m^{2}) of red, white and pink blossoms.

Upjohn did not like the smell of cooking interfering with his work. So in 1927, he built the Dining Hall which he used for both private and business entertaining. The original carpet in the Dining Hall has since been replaced with a custom design incorporating Upjohn’s peonies.

W.E. Upjohn suffered a heart attack and died at Brook Lodge in 1932.

Alongside the mill pond is a Japanese garden. In 1967, a Japanese guest who was particularly pleased with his stay at Brook Lodge, sent an authentic temple lantern as a token of his appreciation. With the help of a Japanese architect who insisted that every element "feel right" in order to "look right," the temple garden came to life.

Brook Lodge and the surrounding 557 acres (2.25 km^{2}) of grounds was given to Michigan State University in 2000, and closed at the end of 2009.

== Humanitarian contributions ==
Dr. Upjohn helped establish the commissioner-manager form of government in Kalamazoo. He provided the seed for the Kalamazoo Community Foundation, established the W. E. Upjohn Institute for Employment Research, and contributed to the Kalamazoo Civic Auditorium. Known as a lover of flowers, he established gardens at Brook Lodge, his summer home near Augusta.

== Personal life ==
Dr. Upjohn married Rachel Phoebe Babcock on December 24, 1878. They had five children: Rachel Winifred Upjohn Smith Light (1880-1929), William Harold Upjohn (1884-1928), Mary Upjohn (1889-1889, infant death), Dorothy Upjohn DeLano Dalton (1890-1981), and Genevieve Upjohn Gilmore (1894-1990). Rachel Phoebe Babcock Upjohn died on July 4, 1905, after twenty-seven years of marriage.

On December 25, 1913, Dr. Upjohn married again, this time to his neighbor Carrie Maria Sherwood Gilmore, widow of James F. Gilmore, one of the founders of the Gilmore Brothers department store.

Suzanne Upjohn DeLano Parish, Dr. Upjohn's granddaughter via his daughter Dorothy Upjohn DeLano Dalton, was a Women Airforce Service Pilots (WASP) during World War II, and founded the Kalamazoo Aviation History Museum, later named the Air Zoo.

== See also ==
- Upjohn
- W. E. Upjohn Institute for Employment Research
