= List of surviving Grumman F4F Wildcats =

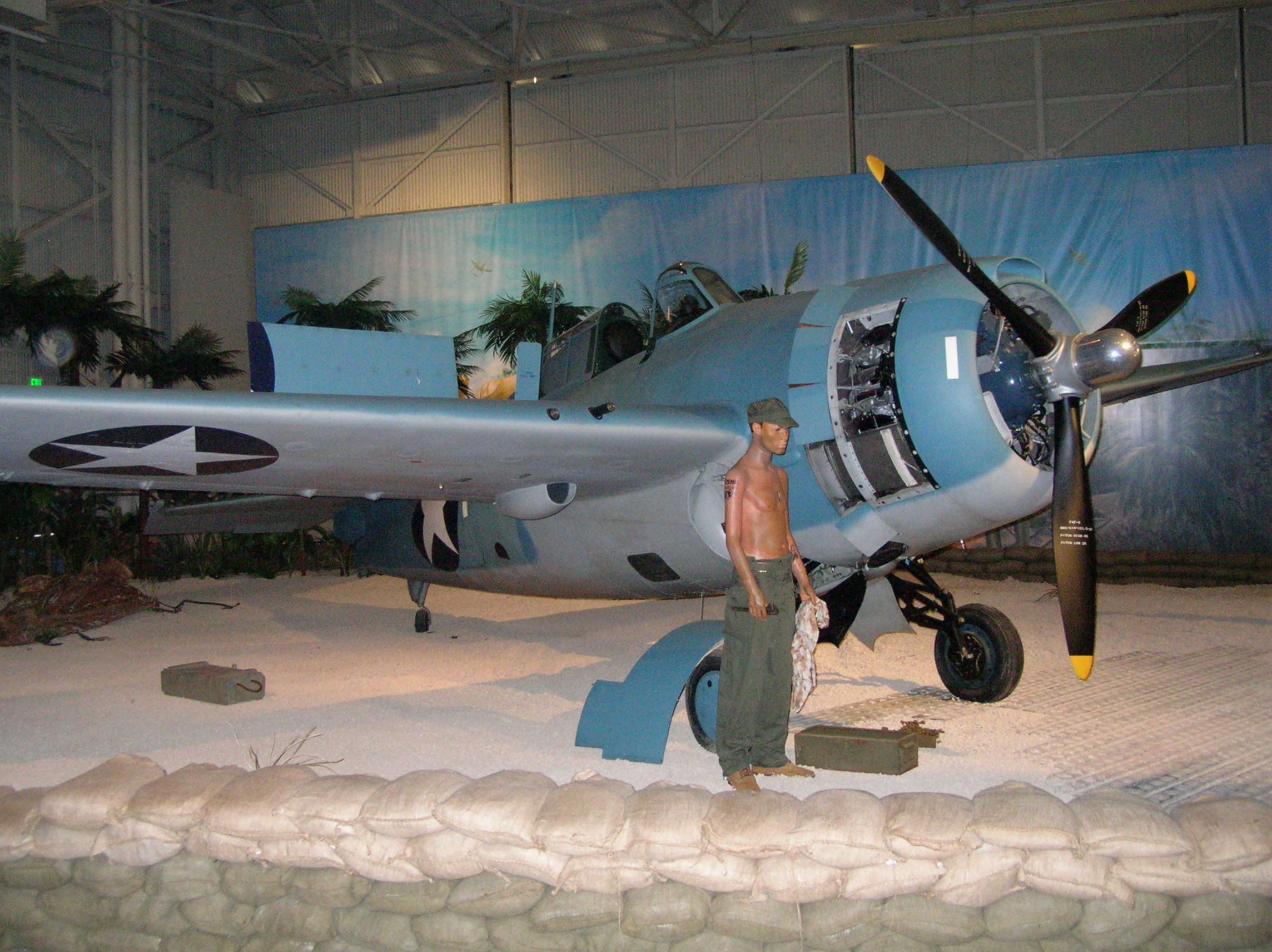
F4F-3 in Guadalcanal Diorama at the Pacific Aviation Museum, Hawaii

The Grumman F4F Wildcat is an American carrier-based fighter aircraft used by the United States Navy, and the British Royal Navy during World War II. Surviving Wildcats are preserved in museums and some are flying Warbirds.

== Surviving aircraft ==
=== Solomon Islands ===
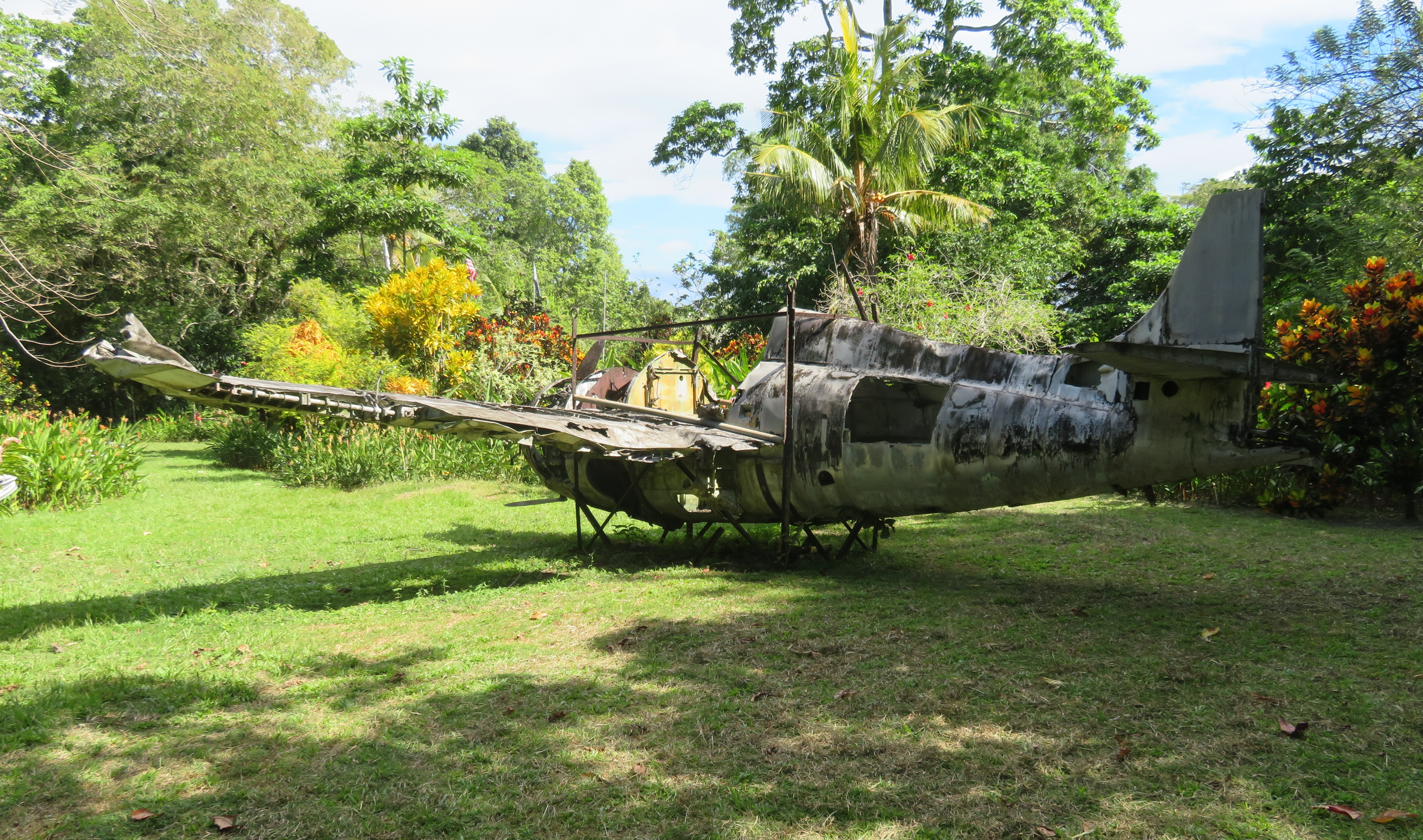
F4F-4 on display at Vilu War Museum in Guadalcanal

On display

F4F-4

- 12068 - displayed unrestored at the Vilu War Museum in Honiara.

=== United Kingdom ===
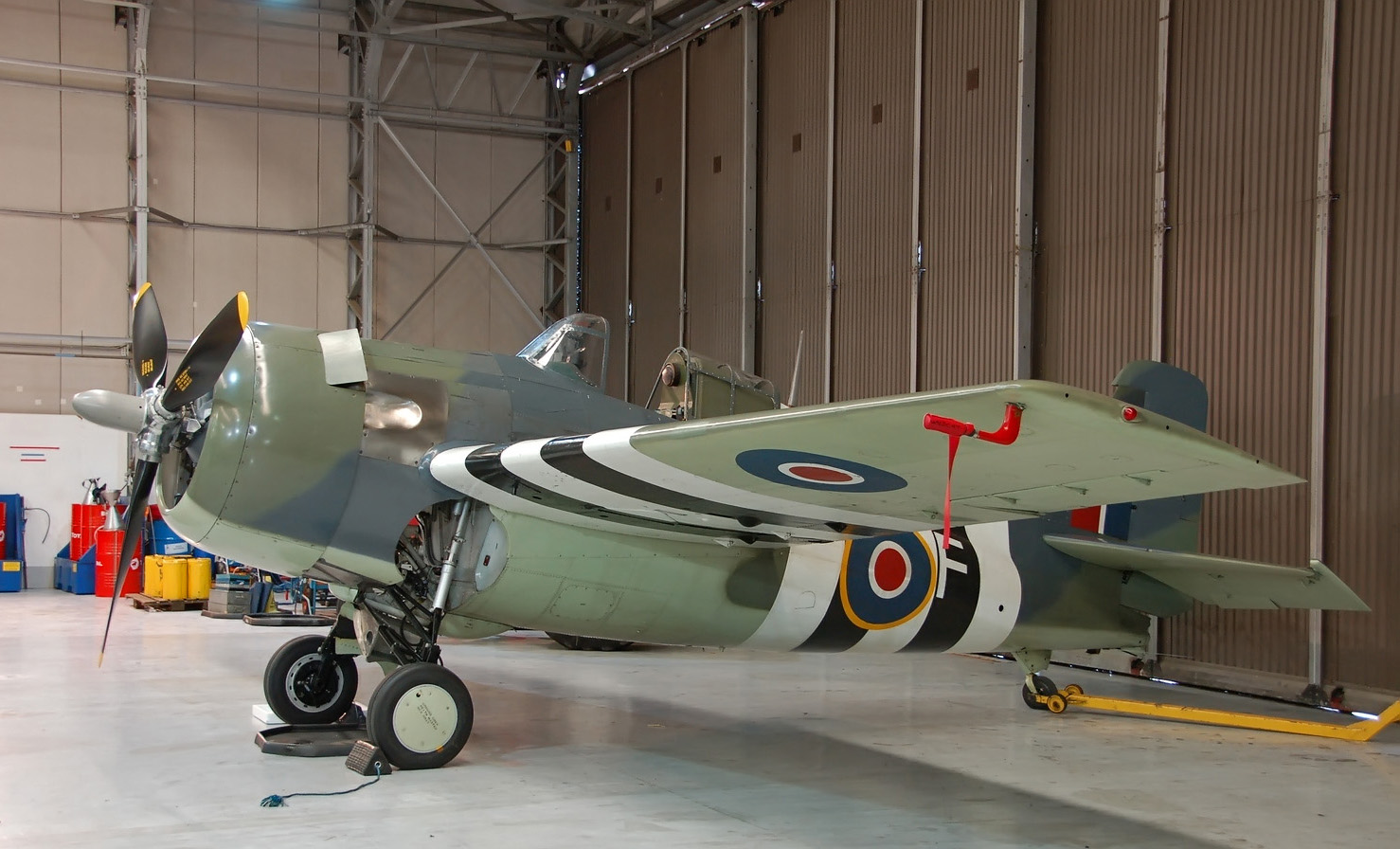
A Grumman Martlet/Wildcat preserved at the Imperial War Museum Duxford

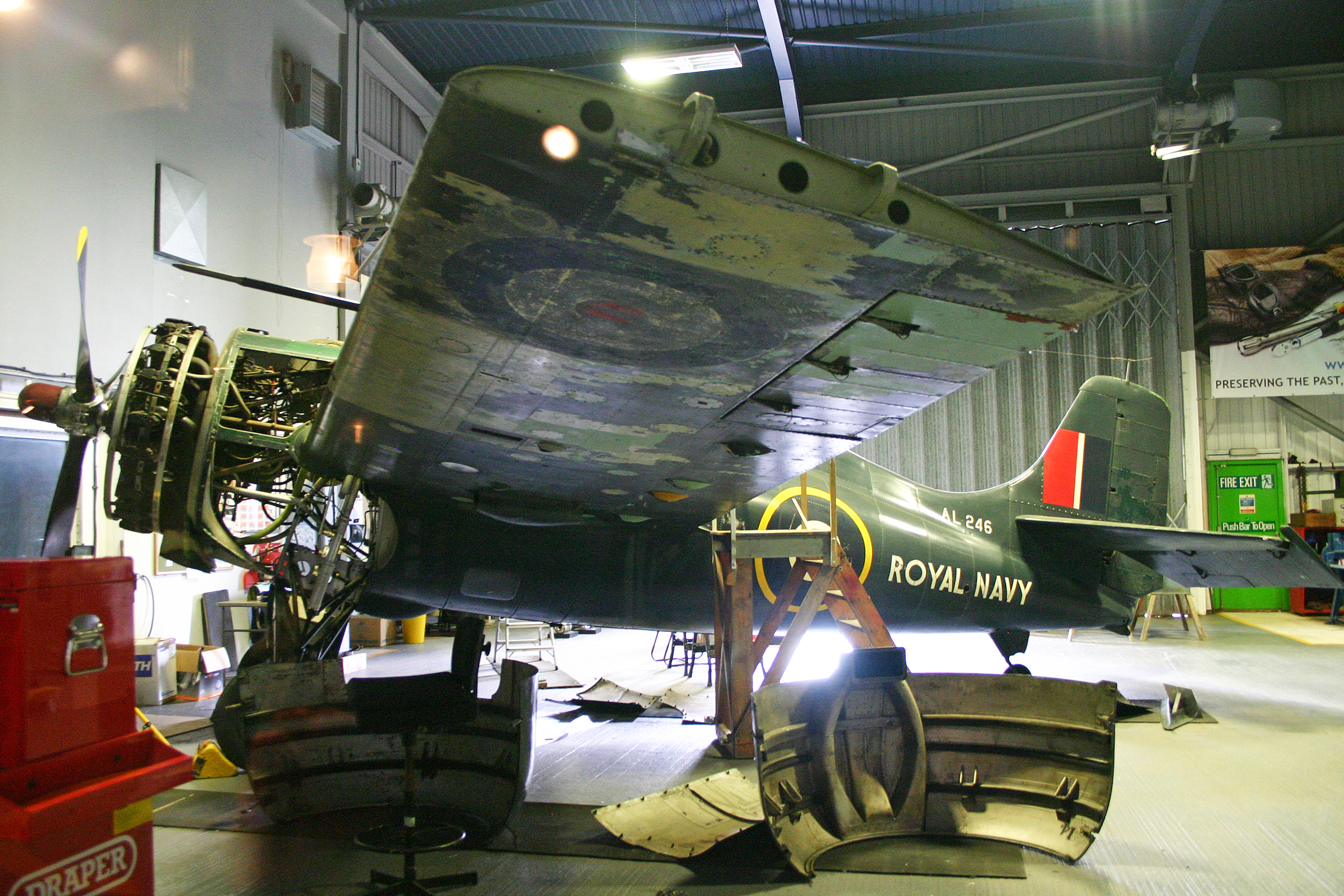
Martlet I undergoing preservation at the Fleet Air Arm Museum.

Airworthy

FM-2

- 86690 - Restored to flight in 2022 by the Aircraft Restoration Company at Imperial War Museum Duxford. Crashed 6/7/2023 at Heveningham Hall.
- 86711 - The Fighter Collection in Imperial War Museum Duxford.

On display

Martlet I (F4F-3)

- AL246 – Fleet Air Arm Museum in RNAS Yeovilton.

Under restoration

FM-1

- JV482 - for display at the Ulster Aviation Society (Long Kesh Hangar), Lisburn, Northern Ireland.

=== United States ===
Airworthy

F4F-3

- 12260 - based at Lewis Air Legends in San Antonio, Texas. As of August 2021, it was on loan to the EAA Aviation Museum in Oshkosh, Wisconsin.

FM-2

- 16203 - privately owned in Wilmington, Delaware.
- 47030 - based at Military Aviation Museum in Virginia Beach, Virginia.
- 47160 - privately owned in Lewes, Delaware.
- 55627 - based at Palm Springs Air Museum in Palm Springs, California.
- 74560 - privately owned in Houston, Texas.
- 86564 - based at Yanks Air Museum in Chino, California.
- 86572 - based at Mid America Flight Museum in Mount Pleasant, Texas.
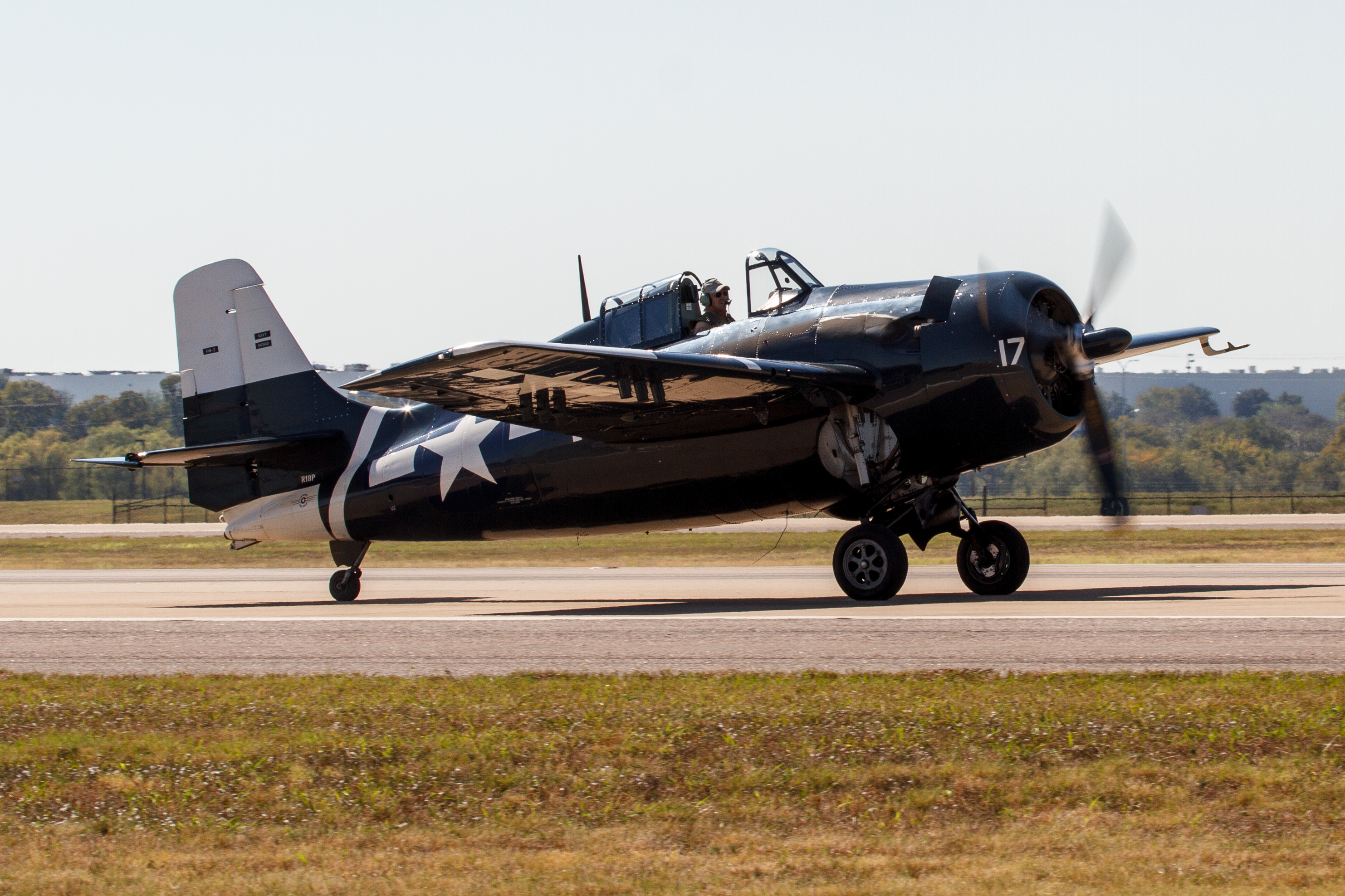
  F4F FM-2, tail number N18P, from the Cavanaugh Flight Museum, at the Alliance Air Show in Ft. Worth, Texas.

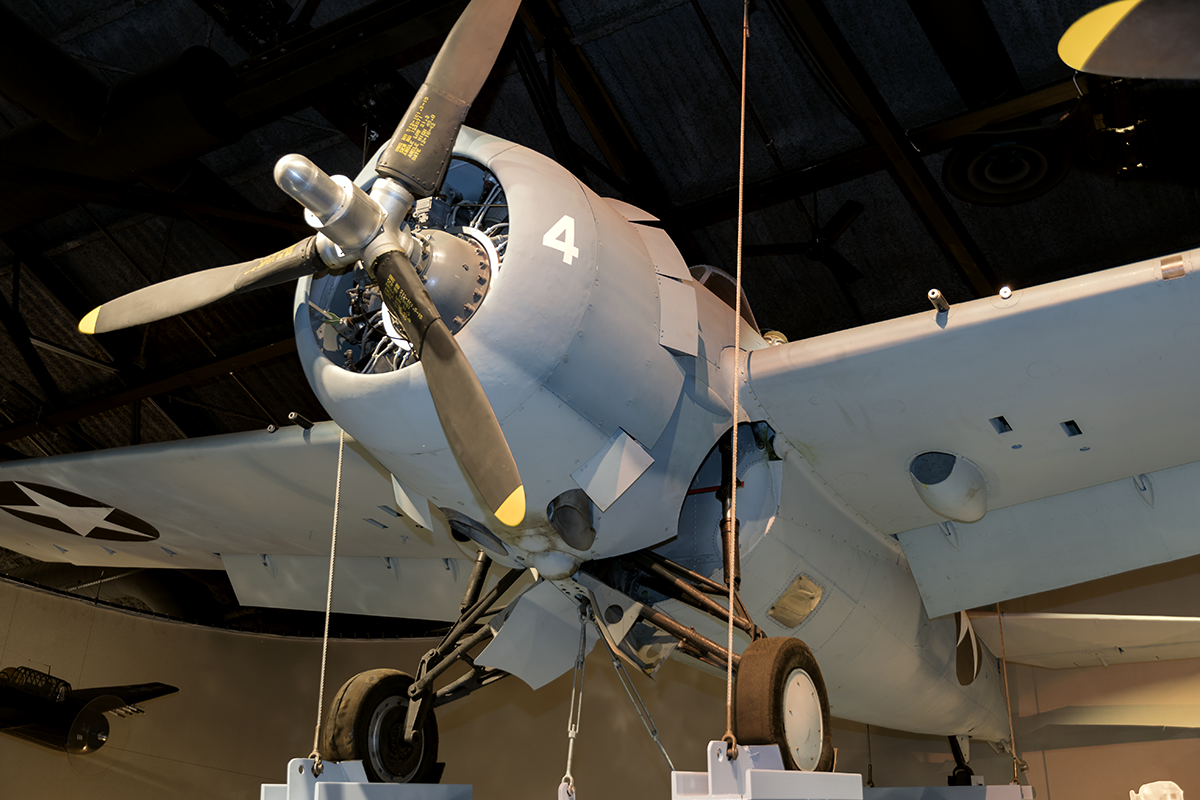
F4F-3 Wildcat Bu12297 recovered from Lake Michigan on display at the Cradle of Aviation Museum.

- 86680 - based at Collings Foundation in Stow, Massachusetts. unique in having a passenger cabin. It is shown to be able to carry 4 passengers.
- 86741 - based at Fantasy of Flight in Polk City, Florida.
- 86746 - based at Frasca Air Museum in Champaign, Illinois.
- 86754 - based at Erickson Aircraft Collection in Madras, Oregon.
- 86774 - based at Fagen Fighters WWII Museum in Granite Falls, Minnesota.
- 86777 - based at Dakota Territory Air Museum in Minot, North Dakota.
- 86819 - based at Commemorative Air Force (FM-2 Sponsor Group) in Mesa, Arizona.
- 86956 - based at Cavanaugh Flight Museum in Addison, Texas. Removed from public display when the museum indefinitely closed on 1 January 2024. To be moved to North Texas Regional Airport in Denison, Texas.

On display

F4F-3

- 3872 - National Naval Aviation Museum at Naval Air Station Pensacola, Florida.
- 4039 - displayed unrestored in a simulated underwater diorama at the National Naval Aviation Museum at Naval Air Station Pensacola, Florida.
- 12290 - USS Midway Museum in San Diego, California.
- 12296 - Pacific Aviation Museum at Ford Island, Hawaii.
- 12297 - Cradle of Aviation Museum in Garden City, New York. It is on loan from the National Naval Aviation Museum at Naval Air Station Pensacola, Florida.
- 12320 - Chicago O'Hare International Airport in Chicago, Illinois as a memorial to Navy Cross and Medal of Honor recipient and airport namesake, LCDR Edward O'Hare. It is on loan from the National Naval Aviation Museum at Naval Air Station Pensacola, Florida.

F4F-3A

- 3956 - Patriots Point Naval Museum in Mount Pleasant, South Carolina.
- 3969 - National Naval Aviation Museum at Naval Air Station Pensacola, Florida.

F4F-4

- 11828 - San Diego Aerospace Museum in San Diego, California. It is on loan from the National Naval Aviation Museum at Naval Air Station Pensacola, Florida.
- 12114 - National Museum of the Marine Corps in Triangle, Virginia.

FM-1

- 14994 - Valiant Air Command Warbird Museum at Space Coast Regional Airport in Titusville, Florida. It is on loan from the National Naval Aviation Museum at Naval Air Station Pensacola, Florida.
- 15392 - National Air and Space Museum in Washington, D.C.

FM-2

- 16089 - National Naval Aviation Museum at Naval Air Station Pensacola, Florida.
- 16161 - Pima Air & Space Museum, adjacent to Davis-Monthan AFB, in Tucson, Arizona.
- 16278 - Hickory Aviation Museum, Hickory, North Carolina. Formerly displayed at the Flying Leatherneck Aviation Museum, Miramar, California.
- 55052 - USS Hornet Sea, Air & Space Museum at the former Naval Air Station Alameda in Alameda, California.
- 57039 - American Heritage Museum in Stow, Massachusetts. While conducting training on 28 December 1944, the FM-2 Wildcat malfunctioned and rolled off the deck of the training aircraft carrier USS Sable. The pilot, ENS William Forbes, escaped from the aircraft before it sank into Lake Michigan. In early December 2012, the aircraft was moved 45 miles under the water to a safe harbor in Waukegan, Illinois. The Wildcat fighter was lifted from the water on Friday 7 December 2012. Restored by Kalamazoo Aviation History Museum in Kalamazoo, Michigan from 2013 to 2024.
- 74120 - New England Air Museum, Windsor Locks, Connecticut.
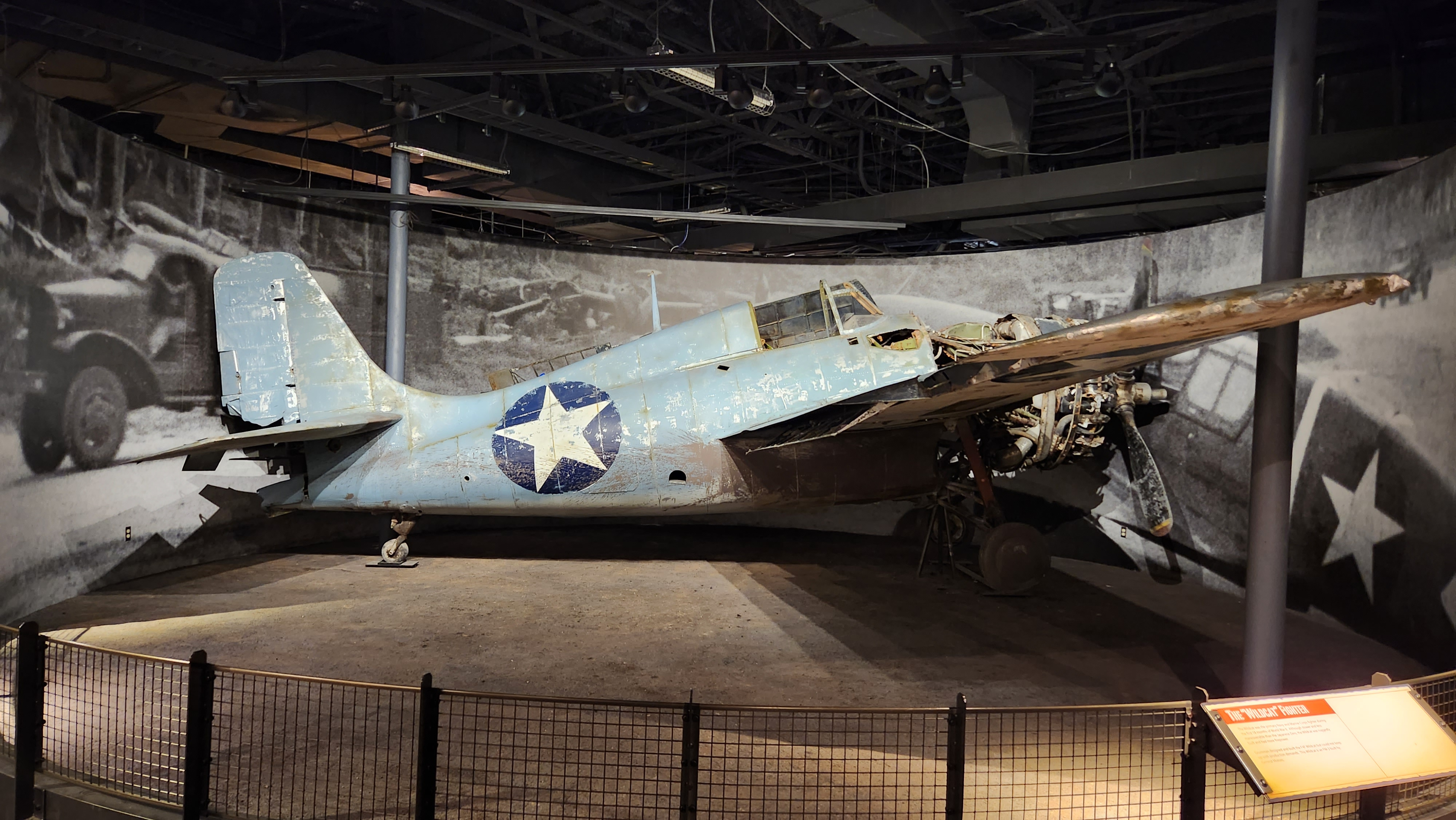
- FM-2 Wildcat at the National Museum of the Pacific War.
  74161 - National Museum of the Pacific War in Fredericksburg, Texas. It is on loan from the National Naval Aviation Museum at Naval Air Station Pensacola, Florida.
- 74512 - Museum of Flight in Seattle, Washington.
- 86581 - Air Zoo in Kalamazoo, Michigan.
- 86747 - National Naval Aviation Museum at Naval Air Station Pensacola, Florida.

Under restoration

FM-2

- 86773 - to airworthiness by private owner in New London, Pennsylvania.
