= Suzanne Parish =

American aviator (1922–2010)

Sue Parish
- Born: Suzanne Upjohn DeLano; November 13, 1922; New York City, New York U.S.
- Died: May 12, 2010 (aged 87); Palm Springs, California U.S.
- Other names: Sue U. Delano; Suzanne U. DeLano Parish
- Occupations: Aviator; Co-founder; Kalamazoo Air Zoo
- Years active: 1941–2010
- Spouse: Preston Parish
- Children: 5

Suzanne Upjohn DeLano Parish (November 13, 1922 – May 12, 2010) was an American aviator. Parish was a member of the Women Airforce Service Pilots (WASPs) during World War II. In 1977, with her husband, Pete Parish, she was the co-founder of the Kalamazoo Aviation History Museum, later known as the Air Zoo, after the animal nicknames of the planes.

== Early life ==
Parish was born in New York City, the daughter of Dorothy Upjohn DeLano Dalton and H. Allan DeLano. Parish was the maternal granddaughter of William E. Upjohn, the founder of The Upjohn Company, the Michigan pharmaceutical manufacturing company.

In 1942, Parish attended Sarah Lawrence College.

== Career ==
Parish learned to fly in 1941, when she was 19 years old. From the time she was 19 to 21, she had accumulated 350 hours in the air.

=== Women Airforce Service Pilots (WASPs) ===
When she was 21, Parish joined the Women Airforce Service Pilots (WASPs). She was in the 44-W-6 class and was stationed at Bryan Army Air Base near Bryan, Texas, where she flew P-40, AT-6, and BT-13 planes.

=== Post-World War II ===
After the war, Parish attempted to get a job as a commercial pilot, to no avail. After marrying Pete Parish in 1948 she had five children and was a full-time mom. In 1958, when her husband purchased a share in a single engine 35C Bonanza, she decided to take up flying once more.

She and her husband soon purchased a Stearman, an AT-6, and a Grumman Wildcat. The last plane they purchased was the P-40.

In 1971, Parish was Vice President of Kal-Aero, Inc., the company she and her husband founded in Kalamazoo.

== Air Zoo ==
In 1977, she and her husband co-founded the Kalamazoo Aviation History Museum, which came to be known as the Air Zoo, near the airport at Kalamazoo, Michigan. The nucleus of the collection was their own planes.

=== Air shows ===
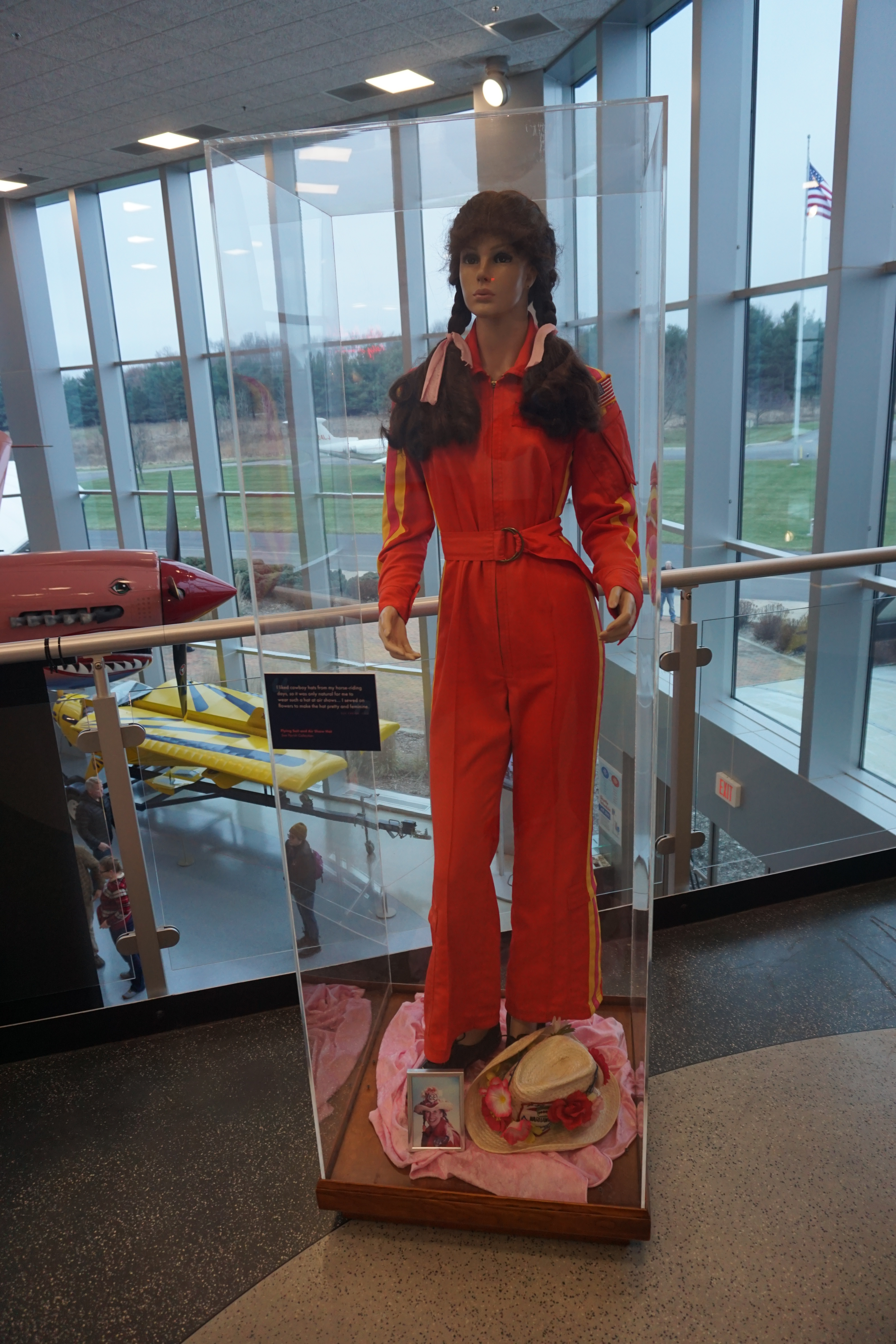
Sue Parish's flight suit at the Air Zoo

Parish flew a pink P-40 Warhawk in several air shows for over 25 years, until she reached her 70s. Deciding that she could no longer handle the G-forces, she flew in her final air show in October 1993. She continued to fly her Beechcraft Beechcraft T-34 Mentor.

== Legacy ==
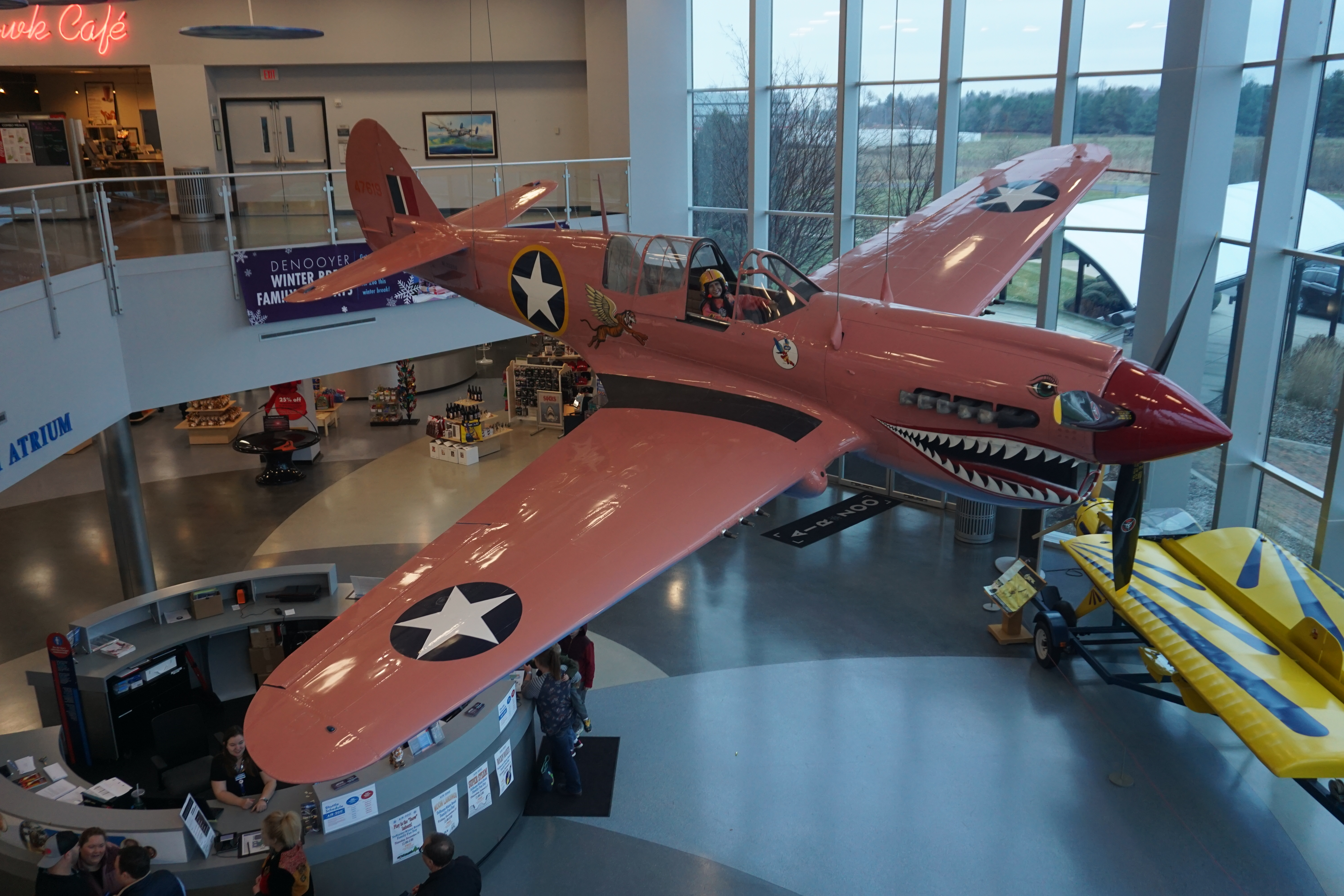
Parish's Curtiss P-40 Warhawk at the Air Zoo

Her signature pink P-40 hangs in the entrance to the Air Zoo.

== Personal life ==
In 1948, Parish married Preston "Pete" Parish. They had two daughters, Barbie Parish and Katie Miller, and three sons, Will Parish, Pres Parish, and Dave Parish. She also had 14 grandchildren. In 1991, the marriage ended in divorce.

=== Death ===
Parish died on May 13, 2010, at Smoke Tree Ranch in Palm Springs, California.

== Honors ==
On November 2, 1977, President Jimmy Carter passed Public Law 95-202, which gave those that served in the WASP program military veteran status. They were previously considered civilians. In July 2009, President Barack Obama signed a bill that gave the WASPs the Congressional Gold Medal.

== Memberships ==
- 1970: Kalamazoo Civic Theatre– Trustee
- 1979: Nazareth College – Board Member
- 1981: Holderness School – Board Member
- 1981: P-40 Warhawk Pilots Association – Past President, Historian (from 1981)
- 1985: Michigan Space Center – Board of Governors Member
- 1991: Kalamazoo Institute Arts – Board Member
- Flying Tigers Association – Life, Honorary affiliate
- Kalamazoo Civic Players – Member
- Warbirds American – Board Member, Member
- William DeLano Memorial Clinic, Offender Aid and Restoration Association – Board Member

== See also ==
- Jacqueline Cochran
- Women Airforce Service Pilots Badge
- Fifinella

== Works and publications ==
- Parish, Sue (2012). Sue Parish Memoirs. Kalamazoo, MI: Suzanne UpJohn DeLano Parish Trust. ISBN 978-0-979-86081-2. OCLC 823241867.
