= Uriah Upjohn =

American physician

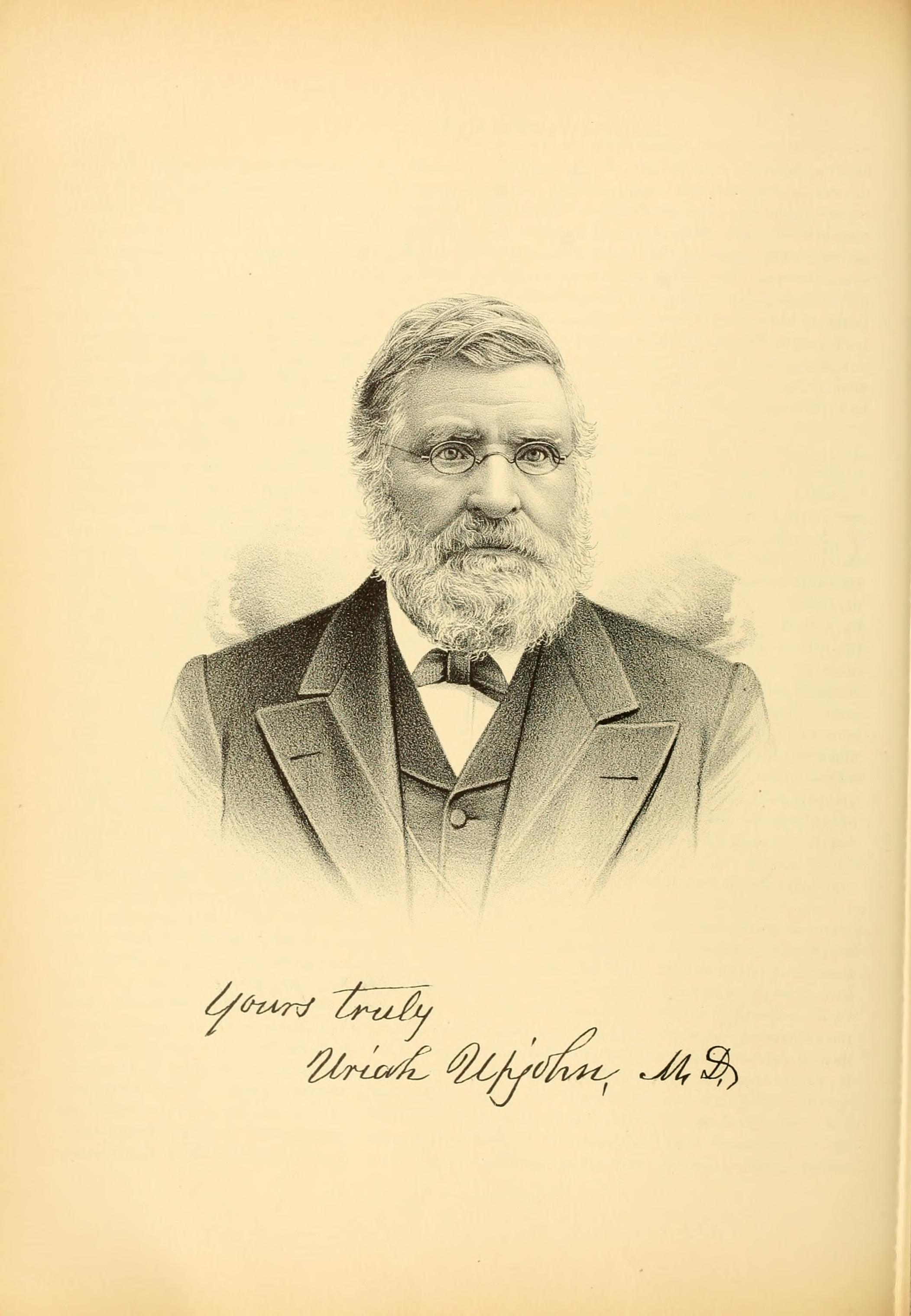
- Born: September 7, 1808
- Died: November 23, 1896 (aged 88)
- Occupation: Medical doctor

Uriah Upjohn (September 7, 1808 – November 23, 1896) was a British-born pioneer medical doctor and abolitionist in the Michigan Territory and later in the state of Michigan. He is the father of William E. Upjohn, founder of The Upjohn Company in Kalamazoo, Michigan.

== Early life ==
Uriah Upjohn was the ninth of twelve children, and the second son born to Mary Standard and William Upjohn (1770-1853). Although born in South Wales, he grew up in Shaftesbury, England. Upjohn received elementary education in the English schools, and then attended the Heytesbury and Castle Carry schools. He also attended the Blue Coat School, a school in Shaftesbury that prepared boys for apprenticeships. Many Upjohn family members were educated at the school, including Upjohn's cousin Richard Upjohn, the famous British-born architect behind New York City's famed Trinity Church.

Widespread unemployment and unrest plagued England in the 1820s, and Uriah Upjohn's father feared the situation would not allow his children to advance in life. In 1828, William Upjohn (1779-1847) sent his two older sons, Uriah Upjohn and William Upjohn Jr. (1807-1887), to the United States to look for opportunities and a home for the family. The brothers arrived in New York City in June 1828 and spent two years travelling the east coast on horseback looking for the perfect location for their family to settle. During the winters, they earned money by teaching in East Hamburg, New York. After their extensive travels, the brothers agreed that central New York would be the best place for their family.

In the spring of 1830, Uriah Upjohn returned home to his family in England while his brother, William Upjohn Jr., stayed in New York. On July 11, 1830, the Upjohn family departed from Liverpool on the William Byrnes, and after a seven-week journey, they arrived in New York City on August 29, 1830. Shortly thereafter, the family moved up the Hudson River and settled in Greenbush, New York.

== Medical education ==
In 1832, Upjohn begin his studies in medicine at the College of Physicians and Surgeons in New York City. The program included two years of study followed by an apprenticeship. He advanced his studies by attending two sessions of "Physic and Surgery" at the New York hospital from 1833 to 1834.During his summers, Upjohn attended two full courses of anatomy and surgery under Professor Alden March, a co-founder of the American Medical Association. Alongside his brother, Upjohn apprenticed under Dr. George Hale. Upon the brothers' graduation in March 1834, Dr. Valentine Mott wrote strong letters of recommendation for both of the brothers.

== Career ==
After graduating from medical school in 1834, Uriah Upjohn briefly practiced medicine in Brighton, New York.

In June 1835, Uriah Upjohn, now 27, and William Jr. went west to the Michigan Territory. The brothers settled in Richland, Michigan, where they built a log cabin. After Michigan achieved statehood in 1837, Upjohn travelled to Detroit to obtain an official license to practice medicine in Michigan.

Michigan's disease-infested swamps and marshes, coupled with a lack of fresh fruit and vegetables, led to an outbreak of malaria and the "Michigan rash," a condition similar to scurvy. Because doctors were scarce, Upjohn was responsible for caring for patients in five counties: Kalamazoo, Allegan, Barry, Calhoun, and St. Joseph.

For more than twenty years, Upjohn travelled on horseback along existing Native American trails in all weather conditions. Many of his patients were struggling to adjust to pioneer life, and as a result, many could not afford to pay Upjohn for his services, and he frequently treated patients for free. As a way to combat diseases such as malaria, Upjohn often dispensed quinine. He used quinine long before its benefits were acknowledged by the medical community.

Upjohn became a well-established doctor in southwestern Michigan. He contributed to the organization of the Kalamazoo County Medical Society, and was elected its first president on October 25, 1848. In the last 15 years of his practice, Upjohn largely served as a medical consultant.

== Political beliefs ==
Uriah Upjohn was an abolitionist. In the early 1830s, he joined the Anti-Slavery Society in Albany, New York. In 1836, helped found a branch in Richland, Michigan. In 1845 and 1852, Upjohn was nominated for Congress on the Free Soil Ticket; however, he declined the nomination in 1852 because he supported the Whig candidate. Upjohn supported the Republican Party upon its founding in 1854.

Upjohn served as land supervisor for Richland, Michigan. Uriah Upjohn and his brother, Dr. William Upjohn (1807-1887), successfully petitioned the state's legislature to include the Homestead Act to Michigan's Constitution.

== See also ==
- Upjohn
