= New England Air Museum =

- Windsor Locks, Connecticut, USA
- Former name: Bradley Air Museum
- Established: 1959
- Location: Windsor Locks, Connecticut
- Coordinates: 41.947147°N 72.691501°W
- Type: Aviation museum
- Founders: Robert Beh; Frank Greene; Harvey Lippincott; Vernon Muse
- Executive Director: Stephanie Abrams
- President: Robert Stangarone
- Curator: Mike Thornton
- Website: www.neam.org

The New England Air Museum (NEAM) is an American aerospace museum located adjacent to Bradley International Airport in Windsor Locks, Connecticut. The museum consists of three display hangars with additional storage and restoration hangars. Its collections include aircraft ranging from early flying machines to supersonic jets, as well as engines, and other pieces of flight-related equipment.

== History ==
The museum began when a group of Pratt & Whitney employees formed the Connecticut Aeronautical Historical Association to save a biplane built by Louis Bancroft. While the airplane would later be destroyed in a fire, the group continued. The first display building, an inflatable dome, was erected in 1967.

In 1981, the first current building was built after a tornado destroyed the then Bradley Air Museum's previous outdoor location along Route 75 on 2 October 1979. To reflect a broader mission scope and eliminate confusion that it was operated by the airport, it became the New England Air Museum in 1984. The museum has since added a restoration hangar in 1989, a storage building in 1991, a military hangar in 1992, a 58th Bomb Wing Hangar in 2003, and a storage hangar in 2010.

The museum was renovated in 2017 with the addition of a mezzanine in two of the hangars to provide views of the aircraft from above. At the same time, a new heating and air conditioning system and LED lighting were installed.

In June 2023, the museum opened a new exhibit about the Tuskegee Airmen and received a grant to build a recording studio.

In early 2024, the museum announced plans for a new 35,000 sq ft (3,300 m^{2}) hangar that will include a Challenger Learning Center and a digital dome to be used as a planetarium. The following month it hired a new curator and collections manager.

It opened a new exhibit about Pratt & Whitney in January 2026.

== Exhibits ==
The main exhibition hangar

Exhibits include the history of Sikorsky Aircraft, computer-based flight simulators, and the 58th Bombardment Wing Memorial with the centerpiece being a restored B-29A. Additionally, there are exhibits on early French aviation, the Tuskegee Airmen, the Kosciuszko Squadron, New England Women in Aviation, and the 57th Fighter Group.

== Collection ==
=== Aircraft on display ===
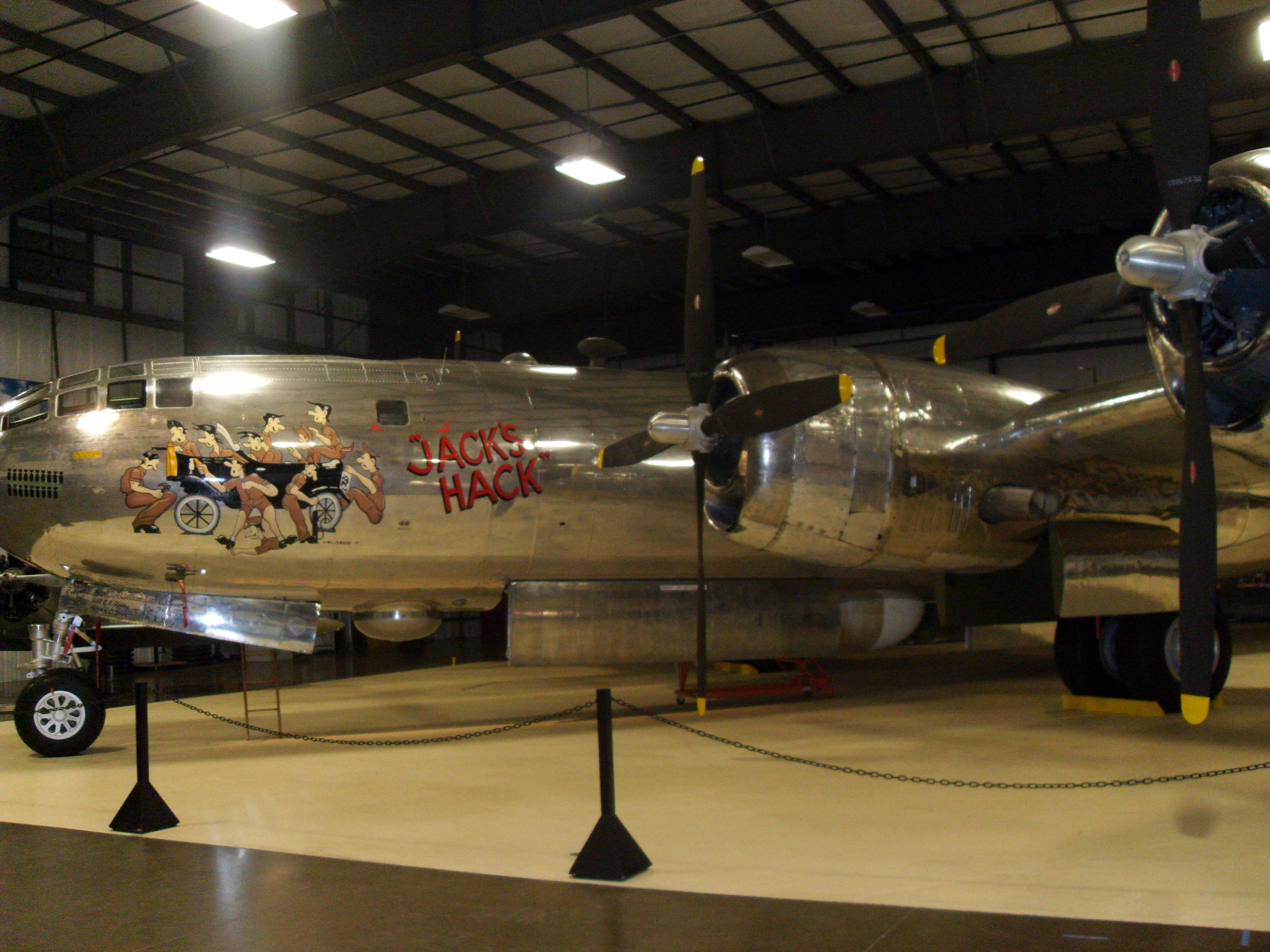
B-29 Superfortress

- AeroVelo Atlas – Partial section
- Bell AH-1S Cobra
- Bell UH-1B Iroquois 62-02550
- Blériot XI
- Boeing B-29A Superfortress 44-61975 Jack’s Hack
- Burnelli CBY-3 Loadmaster
- Chanute Herring Glider – replica
- Chance Vought XF4U-4 Corsair 80759
- Curtiss Model D – replica
- de Havilland C-7 Caribou 62-4188
- Doman LZ-5
- Douglas A-3B Skywarrior 142246
- Douglas A-26C Invader 43-22499 Reida Rae
- Douglas DC-3
- Fairchild-Republic A-10A Thunderbolt II
- Goodyear ZNP-K blimp control car
- Gee Bee Model R – replica
- Eastern FM-2 Wildcat 74120
- Grumman F6F-5K Hellcat 79192
- Heath LNB-4 Parasol
- Kaman HH-43F Huskie
- Kaman K-16B
- Kaman K-225 N401A
- Kaman SH-2F Seasprite 161905
- Laird LC-DW 300 'Solution'
- Lazor-Rautenstrauch LR-1A
- Lockheed Model 10-A Electra 1052
- Kaman K-16B
- Lockheed TV-2 Shooting Star 138048
- Marcoux-Bromberg Special
- Martin RB-57A Canberra 52-1488
- McDonnell Douglas F-4D Phantom II 66-0269
- McDonnell Douglas F-15C Eagle 85-101
- Nixon Special
- North American B-25H Mitchell 43-4999 Dog Daze
- North American F-100A Super Sabre 52-5761
- North American P-51D Mustang 44-72400 – Racer configuration
- Northrop F-89J Scorpion 52-1896
- Pioneer Flightstar MC
- Pratt-Read LNE-1
- Republic P-47D Thunderbolt 45-49458 Norma
- Republic RC-3 Seabee
- Rutan Quickie
- Sikorsky R-4B Hoverfly 43-46503
- Doman LZ-1A 43-45480
- Sikorsky S-39B
- Sikorsky S-51 9602
- Sikorsky XH-39
- Sikorsky HH-52A Seaguard 1428
- Sikorsky CH-54B Tarhe 69-18465
- Sikorsky VS-44A Excambian

=== Aircraft under restoration ===
- Grumman E-1 Tracer
- Grumman HU-16 Albatross
- LTV A-7D Corsair II

=== Aircraft in storage ===
- Aeronca 50C
- AGM-28 Hound Dog
- Bell H-13 Sioux
- Bensen B-8M
- Chalais-Meudon CM-5 Airship Engine Nacelle
- Corben (Reed) E Junior Ace
- de Havilland U-6A Beaver
- Douglas A-4 Skyhawk
- Dyndiuk Sport
- Fokker Dr. I – replica
- Granville Gee Bee Model A
- Great Lakes 2T-1A Sportster – replica
- Grumman F-14B Tomcat
- Grumman F9F-2 Panther
- Grumman TBM-3E Avenger
- Gyrodyne QH-50C DASH
- Gyrodyne XRON-1 Rotorcycle
- Harmening High Flyer Powered Parachute
- Hiller OH-23G Raven
- Kaman HTK
- Lazor-Rautenstrauch LR-1A Nick's Special
- Lockheed F-104C Starfighter 56-901
- McDonnell Douglas F-4D Phantom II
- Mead Primary Glider – replica
- Mikoyan-Gurevich MiG-15bis
- Monnett Monerai S
- National Ballooning 358 (AX-8) Montgolfier
- North American F-86 Sabre
- Piasecki HUP-2 Retriever
- Piasecki HUP-2 Retriever
- Piccard AX-1 Jonathan
- Radioplane OQ-2
- Radioplane YOQ-19
- Raven S-40 Vulcoon
- Rearwin 8135 Cloudster
- Republic F-105B Thunderchief
- Rockwell Saberliner 65
- Rutan Quickie
- Rutan VariEze
- Sikorsky LH-34D Seabat
- Sikorsky R-4B
- Sikorsky S-16 – replica
- Stinson 10-A
- Ultralight Products Mosquito 166
- Viking B-8 Kittyhawk
- Vought SSM-N-8 Regulus I
- Waco YKC-S
- XSM-73 Goose
- Zephyr ZAL

=== Library ===
The museum library has approximately 6,000 aviation books, approximately 20,000 periodicals, approximately 10,000 technical manuals, approximately 21,000 photographs, nearly 8,000 slides, over 200 pieces of artwork, over 1,200 prints, and approximately 500 engineering drawing and blueprints.

== See also ==
- List of aviation museums
- List of museums in Connecticut
