= Viking B-8 Kittyhawk =

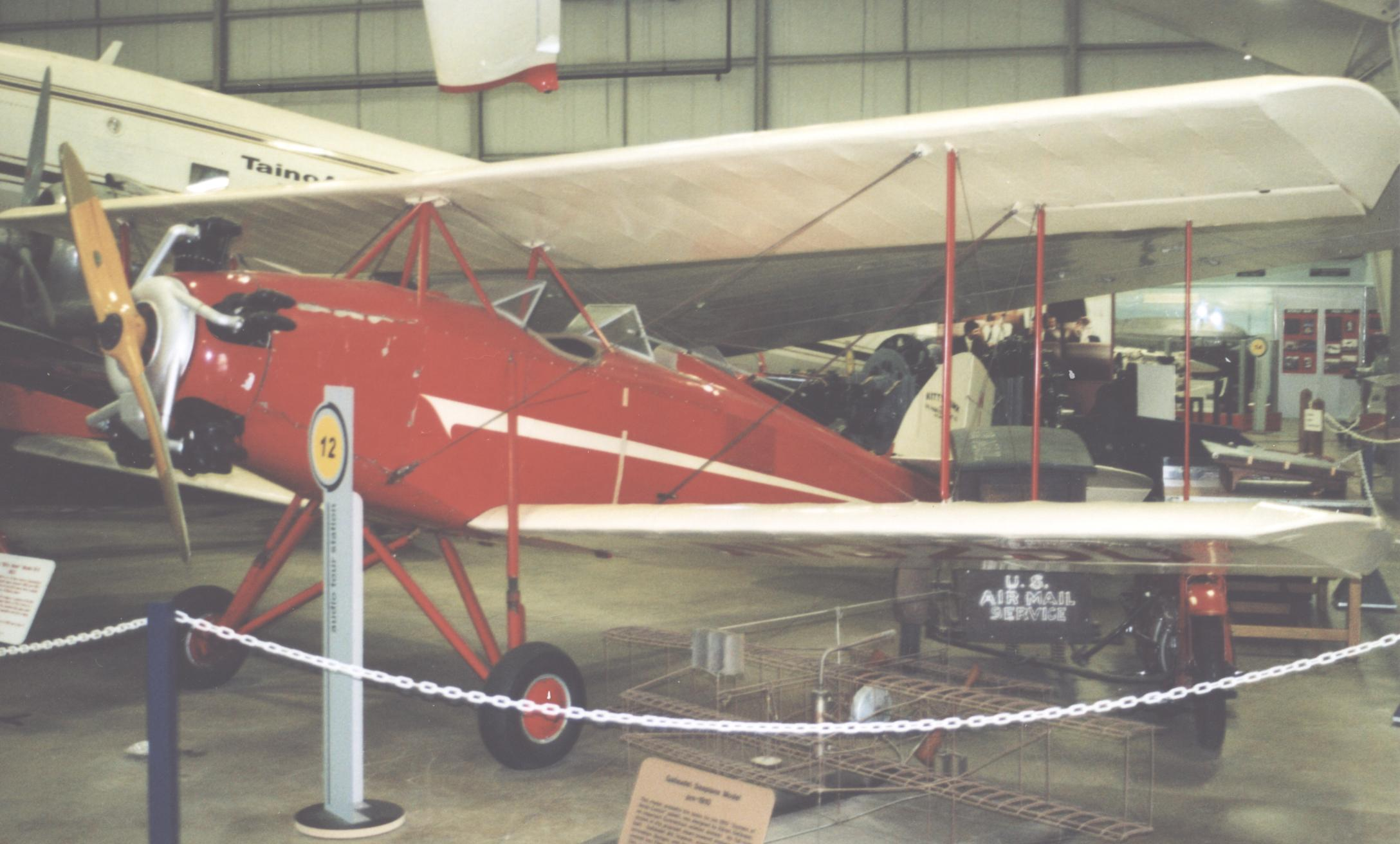
- Viking B-8 Kittyhawk on display at the New England Air Museum, Windsor Locks, Connecticut in June 2005

General information
- Type: single-engine open-cockpit biplane
- National origin: United States
- Manufacturer: Viking Flying Boat Co
- Designer: Allen Bourdon
- Status: 1 airworthy, 1 preserved
- Primary user: private pilot owners
- Number built: 31

History
- Introduction date: 1930
- Developed from: Bourdon B-4

The Viking B-8 Kittyhawk was an American single-engine open-cockpit biplane of the early 1930s.

== Development ==
The Viking B-8 Kittyhawk was developed from the Bourdon B-4 Kittyhawk, 31 examples being built during 1930 and 1931 at Viking's factory in New Haven, Connecticut. Some aircraft were fitted with EDO floats for operation from water.

== Operators ==
The Viking B-8 was flown by private pilot owners and by barnstorming firms who utilised the three-seat layout with a twin-passenger cockpit located ahead of separate pilot's cockpit.

== Surviving aircraft ==
In 2015 Viking Kitty Hawk Serial #28 was undergoing restoration to airworthiness following a landing accident in 1973. Viking Kitty Hawk Serial #30 is in storage at New England Air Museum.

== Specifications ==
Data from U.S. Civil Aircraft Vol. 4

General characteristics

- Crew: 1
- Capacity: 2 passengers
- Length: 22 ft 11 in (6.99 m)
- Wingspan: 28 ft 4 in (8.64 m)
- Height: 8 ft 8 in (2.64 m)
- Wing area: 233.4 sq ft (21.68 m^{2})
- Airfoil: USA-27
- Empty weight: 1,178 lb (534 kg)
- Gross weight: 1,950 lb (885 kg)
- Fuel capacity: 35 US gal (29 imp gal; 130 L)
- Powerplant: 1 × Kinner B-5 5-cylinder radial , 125 hp (93 kW)

Performance

- Maximum speed: 112 mph (180 km/h, 97 kn)
- Cruise speed: 95 mph (153 km/h, 83 kn)
- Stall speed: 42 mph (68 km/h, 36 kn) (landing speed)
- Range: 425 mi (684 km, 369 nmi)
- Service ceiling: 14,500 ft (4,400 m)
- Rate of climb: 730 ft/min (3.7 m/s)
