= Heath Baby Bullet =

Baby Bullet
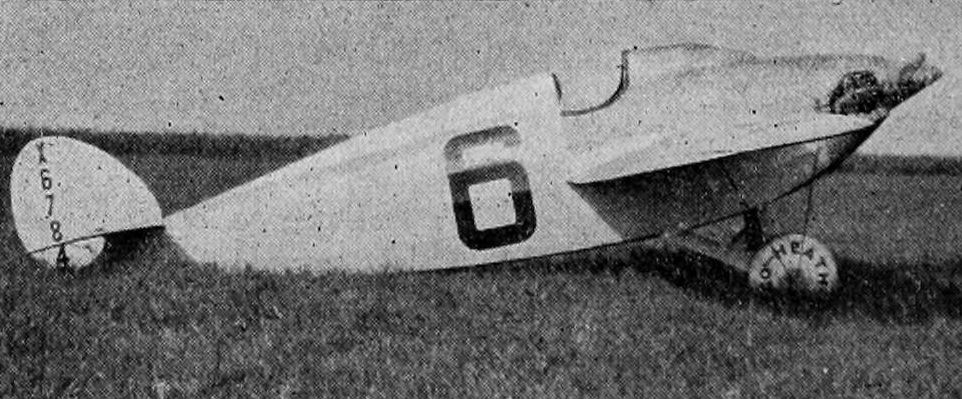

General information
- Type: Racing aircraft
- National origin: United States
- Designer: Edward Bayard Heath

The Heath Baby Bullet was a racing aircraft built during the interwar period.

== Design and development ==
The Baby Bullet started as a single place, mid-winged, open cockpit, conventional landing gear equipped aircraft. A Bristol Cherub engine was first used, followed by a Continental A-40.

== Operational history ==
- 1928 National Air Races
- 1934 National Air Races - Bob Chonsky renamed his plane the "Angell Whistler" and crashed with a failed landing gear.

== Variants ==
- 1932 Single main wheel version

== Specifications (Baby Bullet) ==
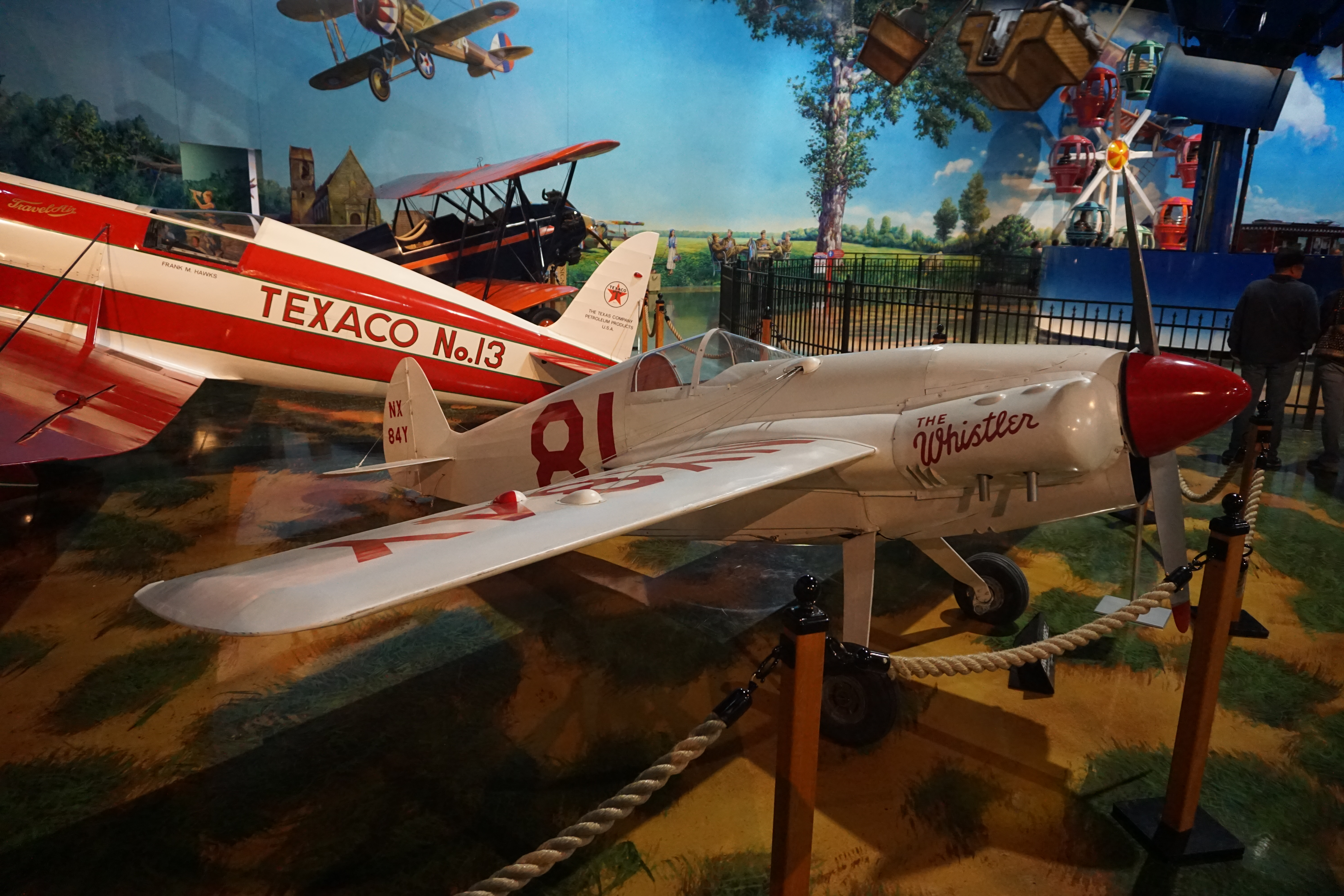
Heath Baby Bullet on display at the Air Zoo

Data from History's Most Important Racing Aircraft

General characteristics

- Crew: 1
- Length: 14 ft 6 in (4.42 m)
- Wingspan: 18 ft (5.5 m)
- Powerplant: 1 × Bristol Cherub , 32 hp (24 kW)

Performance

- Maximum speed: 140 mph (230 km/h, 120 kn)
