= Air Zoo =

- Location within Michigan
- Former name: Kalamazoo Aviation History Museum
- Established: 1977
- Location: Portage, Michigan
- Coordinates: 42°13′39″N 85°33′30″W
- Type: Aviation museum
- Founders: Pete Parish; Sue Parish
- Website: AirZoo.org

The Air Zoo, founded as the Kalamazoo Aviation History Museum, is an aviation museum and indoor amusement park next to the Kalamazoo-Battle Creek International Airport in Portage, Michigan. The Air Zoo holds many historical and rare aircraft, including the world's fastest air-breathing aircraft, the SR-71B Blackbird. Many of its antique planes are airworthy. Among its other attractions are a 180-degree theater that projects a simulation of a B-17 bombing mission during World War II; and various amusement rides, including flight simulators of a rocket trip to Mars, a U.S. Navy (former Blue Angel) F/A-18 Hornet, a stunt biplane, a hot air balloon, a U.S. Navy F-14A Tomcat that served aboard USS America, and more. Air Zoo is a Smithsonian Affiliate.

== History ==
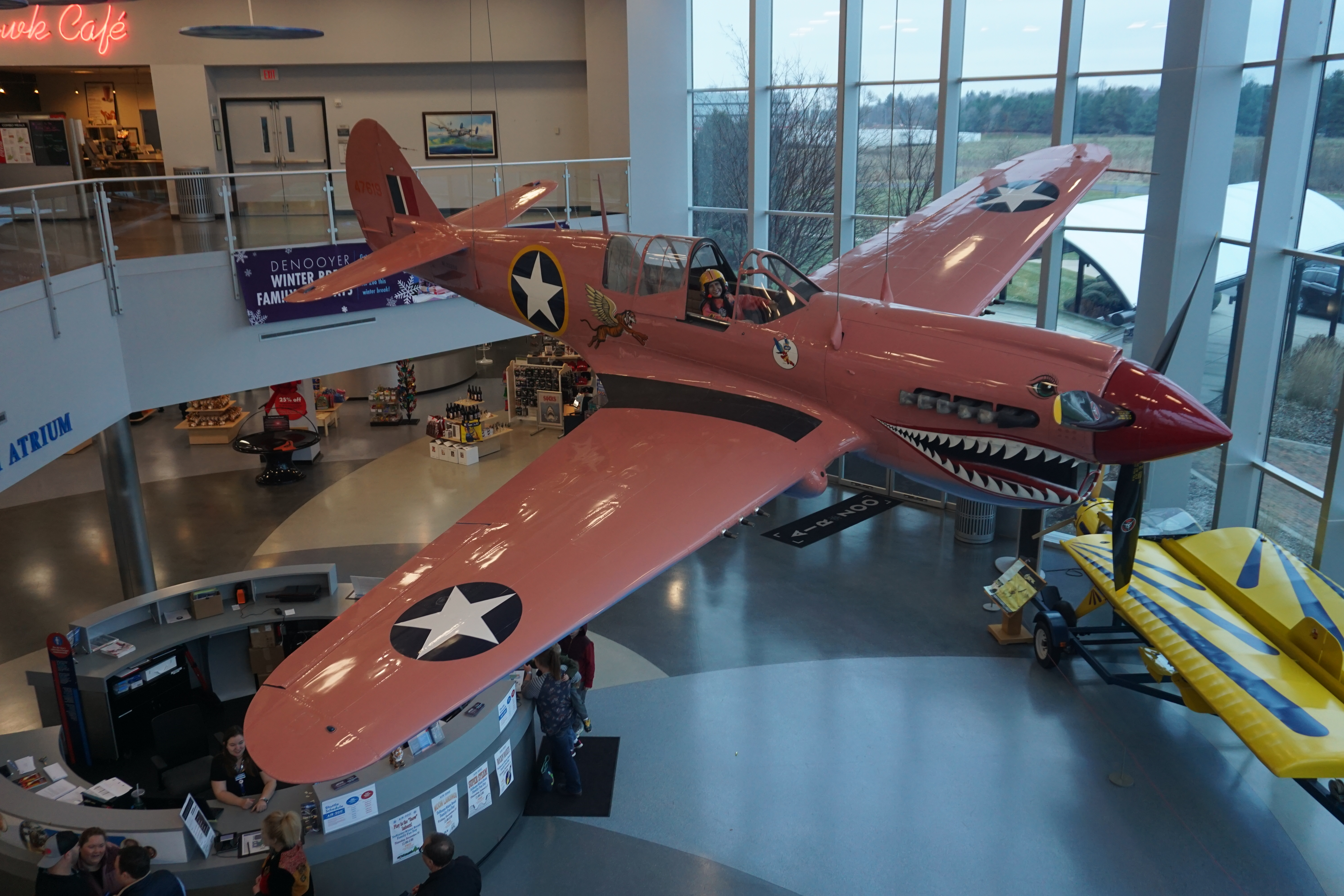
Sue Parish's Curtiss P-40 Warhawk at the Air Zoo

The Kalamazoo Aviation History Museum was founded in 1977 by former Women Airforce Service Pilots (WASPs), Sue Parish and WWII pilot Preston "Pete" Parish. The museum was dedicated to "preserving and displaying historical and military artifacts and to serving as a research and educational facility for this country and abroad." The doors opened on November 18, 1979 and the museum quickly developed into one of the 10 largest nongovernmental aviation museums in the United States.

In early 1999, the name Air Zoo was adopted. The name comes from the fact that so many of the planes in its collection have animal nicknames like Warhawk, Gooney bird, Wildcat, Bearcat, and Hellcat.

Also in early 1999, plans began for a major renovation. On April 25, 2003, construction began on a new 120,000-square-foot (11,000 m^{2}) facility that doubled the museum's size and added flight simulators, amusement rides, and Smithsonian Institution exhibitions, character actors, and a 4-D theater that combines 3-D films with special effects such as rocking chairs and plumes of smoke to simulate anti-aircraft fire.

The new facility opened in April 2004. It holds the world's largest hand-painted indoor mural: "Century of Flight", by aviation artist Rick Herter, a 25,000-square-foot (2,300 m^{2}) tribute to the history of flight in the main entrance.

In June 2007, the Michigan Space & Science Center opened in the old building (East Campus). The building featured World War II aircraft, several artifacts from the defunct Jackson Space Center, and more.

On October 1, 2011, the Air Zoo expanded its Main Campus again, moving everything from the East Campus into the new 50,000-square-foot addition. Half of this new expansion (known as the "East Wing") is devoted to the Space Theme, while the other half of the add-on includes World War II aircraft. The East Campus is now being used as the Restoration Center, which is noted for its work on aircraft including a Douglas Dauntless, a Sopwith Camel, and the museum's latest project: an FM-2 Wildcat that had been lying at the bottom of Lake Michigan for 68 years.

In December 2020, the Air Zoo was able to acquire an F-117A Nighthawk, tail number 85-0817, on loan from the United States Air Force. This aircraft was the first stealth fighter to be donated to a non-governmental museum.

It was also announced that the museum was donated one of the anchors and several pieces of the flight deck from the aircraft carrier USS Kitty Hawk for outside display. This will go on display in June 2024 with help of the USS Kitty Hawk Veterans Association.

== Exhibits ==
The Air Zoo contains different archival collections. Since September 23, 1995, the Air Zoo is home to the Michigan Aviation Hall of Fame. It also holds the Guadalcanal Memorial Museum, which is sponsored and maintained by the Guadalcanal Campaign Veterans Association featuring information about the fighting on Guadalcanal during World War II.

== Collection ==
=== Aircraft on display ===
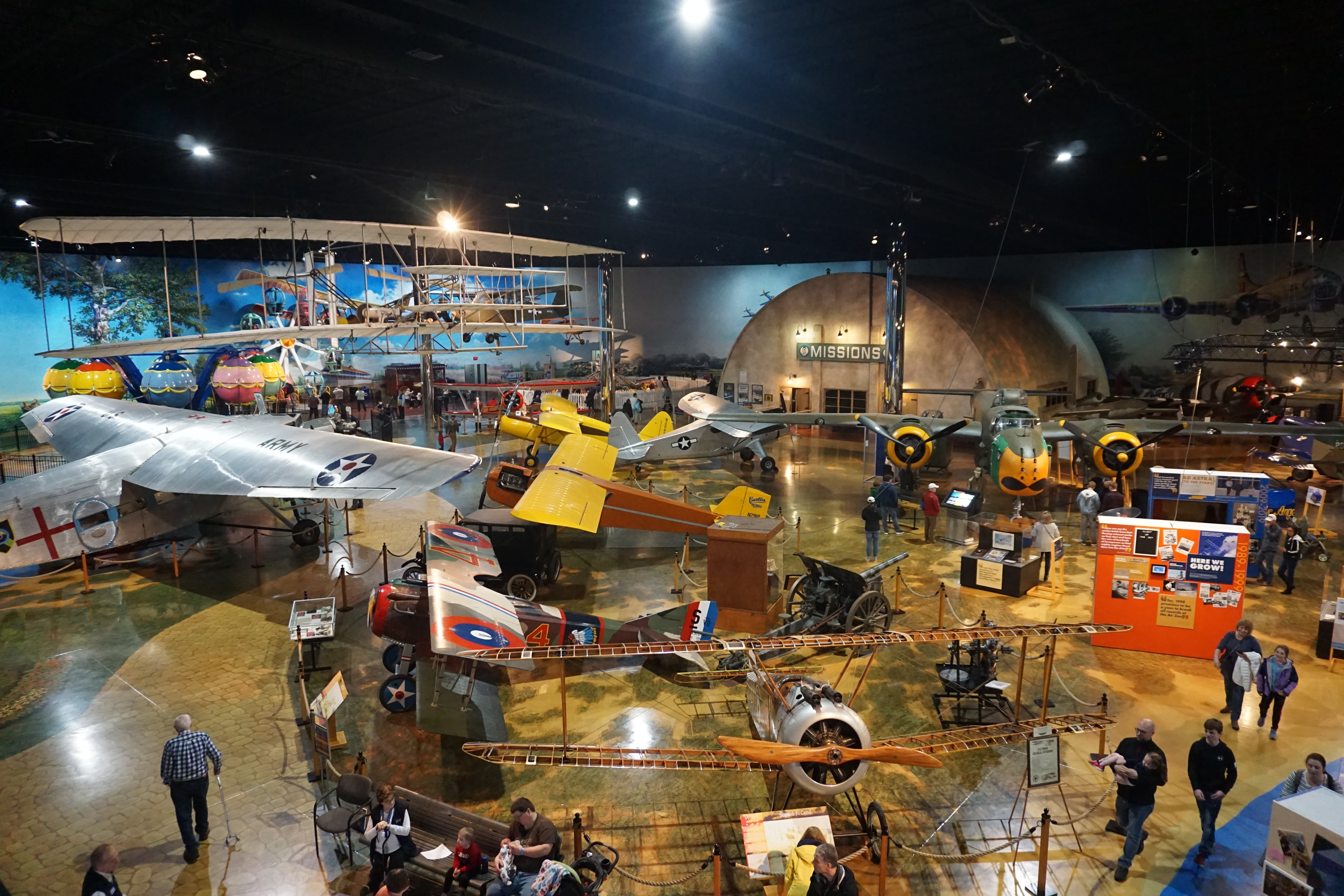
Inside the museum

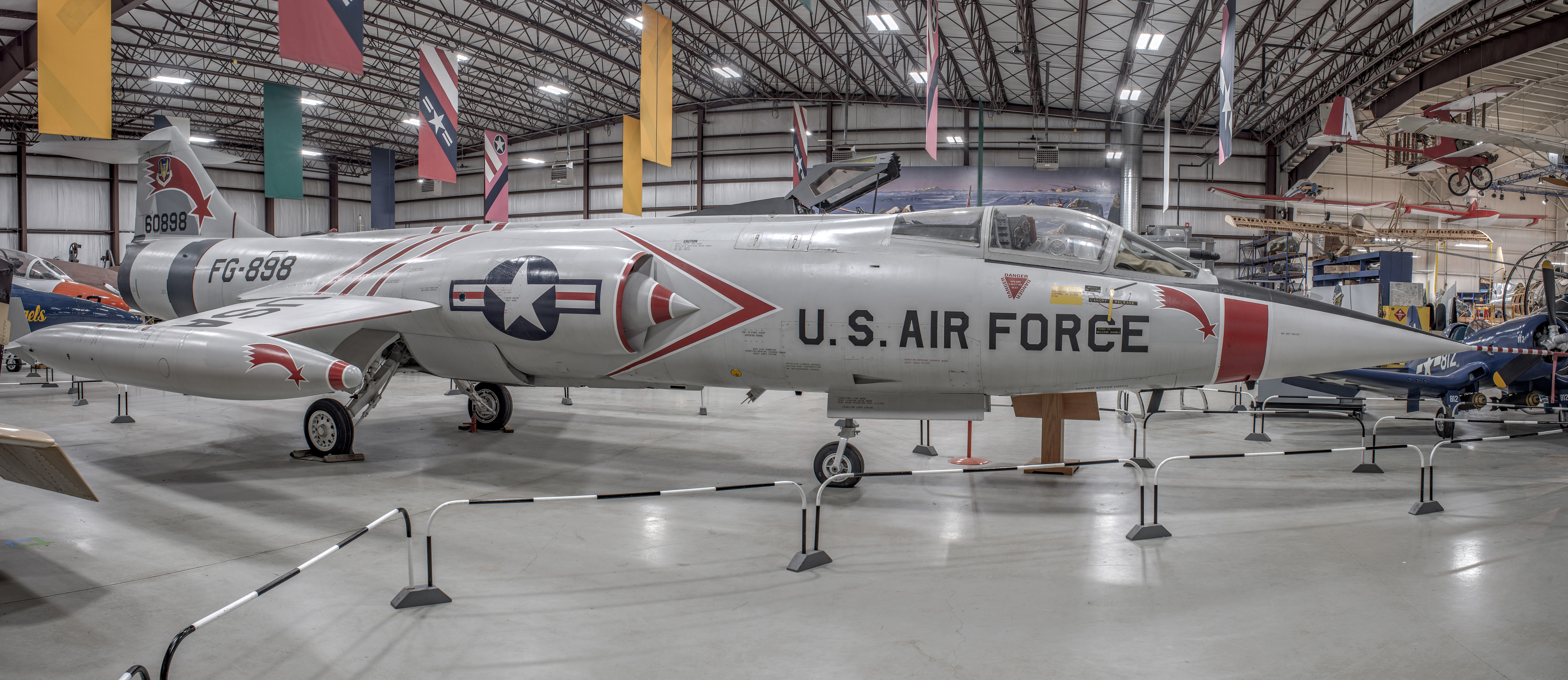
The Lockheed F-104C Starfighter at the Air Zoo in Kalamazoo Michigan.

- Aeronca 65CA Chief
- Aeronca L-3B Grasshopper
- Avid Flyer
- Beechcraft T-34 Mentor
- Bell AH-1J SeaCobra
- Bell TP-39Q Airacobra
- Boeing-Stearman N2S-5
- Boilerplate Gemini Test Vehicle
- Cessna L-19 Bird Dog
- Cirrus VK-30
- Curtiss Model D (Replica)
- Curtiss JN-4 (Scale Model)
- Curtiss P-40N Warhawk
- Curtiss Robin
- Curtiss XP-55 Ascender
- Douglas A4D Skyhawk
- Douglas AD-4NA Skyraider
- Douglas C-47 Skytrain
- Douglas SBD-3 Dauntless
- Fairchild 24K Forwarder
- Fokker Dr.I (Replica)
- Ford 5-AT
- Ford CG-4A
- General Motors FM-2 Wildcat
- Goodyear FG-1D Corsair
- Grumman F6F-5 Hellcat
- Grumman F11F Tiger
- Grumman F-14A Tomcat
- Grumman G-73 Mallard
- Grumman TF-9J Cougar
- Haigh SuperStar
- Heath Baby Bullet
- Heath Parasol
- Hiller OH-23 Raven
- Hiller UH-12A
- Hispano HA-1112-M1L Buchon
- Howard GH-2 Nightingale
- Howard PT-23
- Jodel D.92 Bébé
- Laister-Kauffman TG-4A
- Learjet 23
- Lockheed F-104C Starfighter
- Lockheed F-117 Nighthawk
- Lockheed F-80C Shooting Star
- Lockheed P-38 Lightning (60% replica)
- Lockheed T-33A
- Lockheed S-3B Viking
- Lockheed SR-71B Blackbird
- Long Henderson HL-1 Longster
- Martin B-57B Canberra
- McDonnell Douglas F-4E Phantom II
- McDonnell Douglas F/A-18A Hornet
- Mikoyan-Gurevich MiG-21
- Murphy Renegade Spirit
- Naval Aircraft Factory N3N Canary
- North American AT-6G Texan
- North American B-25H Mitchell
- North American F-86F Sabre
- North American SNJ-5
- North American T-28 Trojan
- Osprey X-28A Sea Skimmer
- Piasecki HUP-3 Retriever
- Pietenpol Air Camper
- Piper L-4H Grasshopper
- Piper J-3 Cub
- Republic F-84F Thunderstreak
- Republic P-47D Thunderbolt
- RotorWay Exec 90
- Ryan PT-22 Recruit
- Schweizer LNS-1
- Sopwith F.1 Camel (Replica)
- SPAD S.VII (Replica)
- Sun Standard G Ratio 4:1 hang glider
- Timm N2T-1 Tutor
- Travel Air Type R Mystery Ship (Replica)
- Vought F-8J Crusader
- Vultee BT-13 Valiant
- WACO INF
- WACO VPF-7
- W.A.R. F4U Corsair
- Wolf W-11 Boredom Fighter
- WSK Mielec Lim-2

=== Aircraft under restoration ===
- Douglas SBD-2P Dauntless
- General Motors FM-2 Wildcat
- Consolidated PBY Catalina

== See also ==
- List of aerospace museums
