= The Galloping Ghost (aircraft) =

P-51D Mustang race aircraft

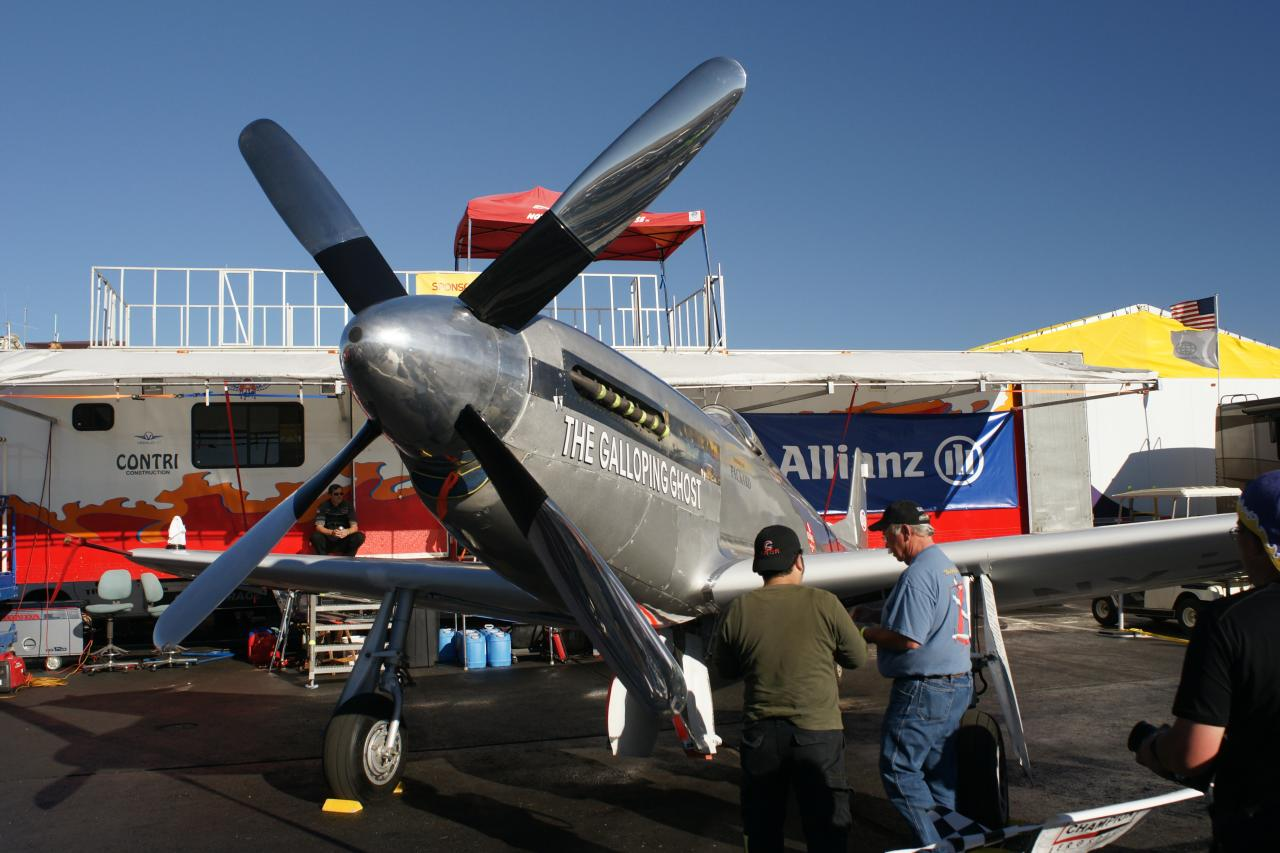
- The Galloping Ghost in 2010

General information
- Type: North American P-51D-15-NA Mustang
- Manufacturer: North American Aviation
- Registration: N79111
- Serial: 44-15651

History
- Fate: Crashed September 2011

The Galloping Ghost was a P-51D Mustang air racer that held various airspeed records and whose fatal crash in 2011 led to several NTSB recommendations to make air shows safer. It had the registration N79111.

Built in 1944 by North American Aviation for the Army Air Force, the plane was sold as postwar surplus. Over the next half-century, it was modified and raced by a series of owners, including, finally, Aero Trans Corp. in Ocala, Florida. It was destroyed on September 16, 2011, when it crashed into spectators at the Reno Air Races, at the Reno Stead Airport north of Reno, Nevada.

== History ==
The Galloping Ghost was built by North American Aviation as a P-51D-15-NA, Army Air Force serial number 44-15651, at the NAA's Inglewood, California, plant for military use during World War II. Once the aircraft was delivered, it was transferred to Walnut Ridge Army Air Field in Walnut Ridge, Arkansas. It was later classified as surplus stock and offered to the public for around $3,500 ($57,900 today). Around that time, Steve Beville and Bruce Raymond were looking to compete in the National Air Races in Cleveland, Ohio, that were to be held in September. Beville was able to secure the aircraft from the WAA on July 22, 1946, even though P-51 sales at Walnut Ridge Army Air Field had formally ended. Thus, the aircraft was the last to be sold to the public.

Beville and Raymond registered the plane as NX79111 and named it The Galloping Ghost after football star Red Grange. Raymond piloted the aircraft in its first race, the 1946 Thompson Trophy, the first since 1939, when World War II suspended the annual event. Raymond took fourth place on the closed-course track, winning $3,000. The following year, Beville piloted the aircraft in the Kendall Trophy race. He broke the record for fastest closed-course speed on August 31, 1947, with 384.6 miles per hour (619 km/h), breaking the record of 601.7 km/h (374 mph) set by Tex Johnston in the Thompson Trophy race the previous year, winning $2,500. Beville also raced for the 1947 Thompson Trophy, taking fourth. For 1948, Raymond raced in the Sohio (taking fourth), Thompson (second) and Tinnerman (first) Trophies. He won the Tinnerman by less than a second, taking $3,150 and earning a total of $11,850 for all three races. In 1949, Beville raced in the Sohio and Thompson Trophies, taking fourth for both and earning a total of $3,700.

In 1963, the aircraft was purchased by Dr. Cliff Cummins as a stripped hulk. He restored the aircraft and had it modified for racing, included the addition of a lower-profile canopy and reducing the wingspan four feet (120 cm). He first raced it at the Reno Air Races in 1969 as Miss Candace (named after his daughter) race number 69. At the 1970 races, he suffered an engine failure and landed short of the runway, damaging the aircraft.

The aircraft was rebuilt again, this time with a very small canopy taken from a Formula One air racer and a smaller belly cooling scoop. In this configuration, Cummins first raced the aircraft in 1972. In 1973 he qualified the airplane in the third position for the Unlimited Class Gold Race and he took second place behind Lyle Shelton's winning Bearcat. He did win the 1976 National Air Races at Mojave, California, with a speed of 422 miles per hour (679 km/h). After racing the aircraft for several years with limited success, he sold the aircraft in 1979 to Wiley Sanders of Sanders Truck Lines.

Sanders renamed the aircraft Jeannie, after his wife. The aircraft was rebuilt with an eye to weight reduction. In the end, 600 pounds (270 kg) were removed from the airframe. Roy "Mac" McLain flew the aircraft in 1979 at the Reno Air Races. Shortly before the 1980 air races, the aircraft was damaged in a crash at the Van Nuys Airport. In a frantic effort, the aircraft was rebuilt and again flown by McLain, winning the Gold Race at Reno just days later. At the 1981 Reno Air Races, Skip Holm piloted the aircraft to victory in the Unlimited Class Gold Race. The following year, the aircraft suffered an engine failure and did not participate in the Gold Race.

The aircraft was sold to Jimmy Leeward in 1983, shortly after the aircraft's wing span had been reduced another six feet (180 cm). Leeward initially raced the aircraft as Specter, race number X. He later raced the aircraft at Reno as race number 9 and later race number 44 "The Leeward Air Ranch Special." After an engine failure at the 1989 Reno Air Races forced Leeward to land the airplane on a dirt road, the aircraft did not appear at the races between 1990 and 2009.

In 2010, the Galloping Ghost returned to the Reno races.

== 2011 Reno Air Races crash ==
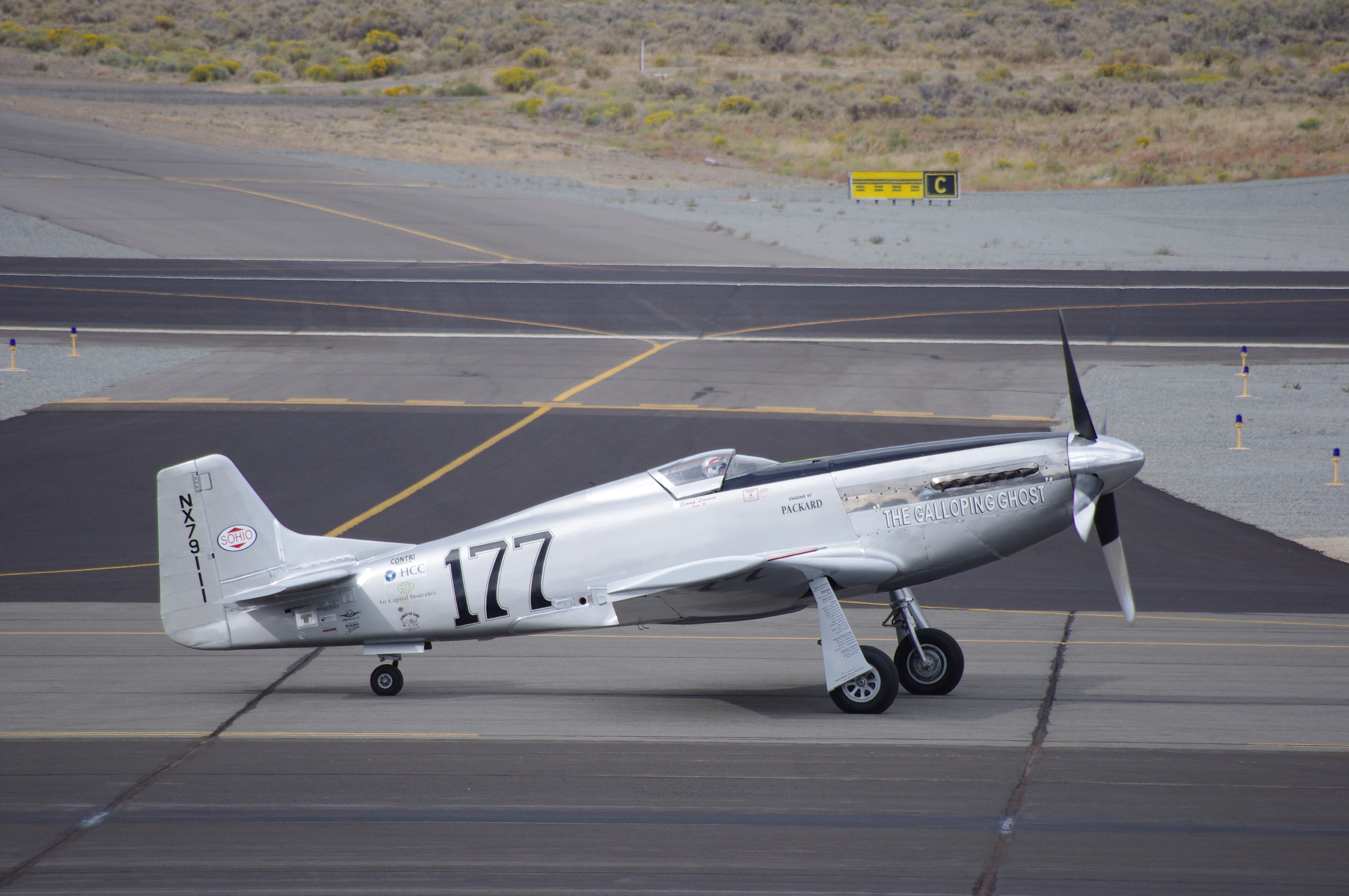
The Galloping Ghost taxiing on the day of the 2011 Reno Air Races crash

In 2011, Leeward flew the aircraft again in the Reno Air Races. On September 16, 2011, The Galloping Ghost crashed into spectators at the races, killing Leeward and 10 spectators and injuring 69 others.

The aircraft had just rounded the last pylon when it pitched upward and then went inverted. While inverted, the plane rocked its wings and suddenly pitched downward towards the ground and grandstands, crashing into the box seating area in front of the grandstands. The National Transportation Safety Board (NTSB) examined whether the loss of a component of the tail played a role in the crash. News reports included a photograph taken right before the crash while the airplane was inverted show a missing left elevator trim tab. A similar event had taken place in 1998: the left trim tab was lost by a modified P-51 Mustang named Voodoo Chile, piloted by "Hurricane" Bob Hannah, during the Reno Air Races. The 1998 incident did not lead to a crash, but Hannah reported that when the elevator trim tab came off, the airplane pitched up and subjected him to over 10 g and a loss of consciousness. When he regained consciousness, the plane had climbed to over 9,000 feet (2,750 m). In that incident, Hannah had been able to bring the damaged plane in for a safe landing.

In the NTSB investigation report, the cause was attributed to extreme pitch-up to 17 g+ caused by the loss of the port elevator trim tab due to wear in the trim tab mounts, exacerbated by lock-nuts on the mounting bolts losing their self-locking ability due to use past their normal life.

== Awards ==
- 1946, First Place, Thompson Trophy
- 1948, First Place, Tinnerman Trophy
- 1976, First Place, Mojave
- 1981, First Place, Reno

== Specifications (The Galloping Ghost) ==
General characteristics

- Crew: 1
- Powerplant: 1 × Packard V-1650-9A Merlin V-12 liquid-cooled piston engine, 3,000 hp (2,200 kW)

Performance

- Maximum speed: 450 kn (520 mph, 840 km/h)

== See also ==
Aircraft of comparable role, configuration, and era

- Dago Red
- Miss Ashley II
- Precious Metal
- Rare Bear
- Red Baron
- September Fury
- Tsunami
- Voodoo
