= Steadfast (aircraft) =

Warbird replica and racing aircraft

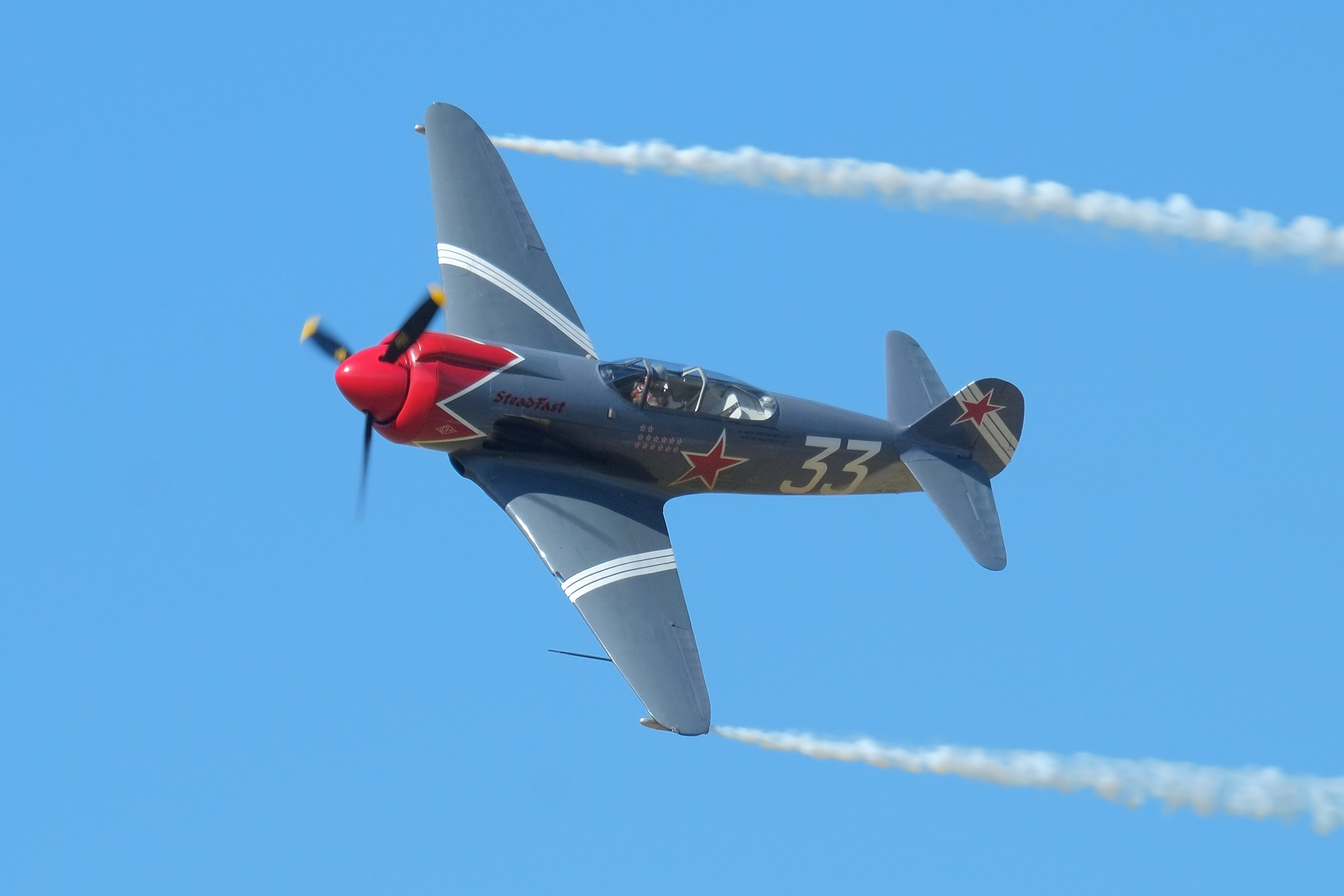
- Steadfast registered ZK-YOV at Wings Over Wairarapa in 2021

General information
- Type: Yakovlev Yak-3UPW
- Role: Warbird replica/Racing aircraft
- Manufacturer: Avioane Craiova
- Construction number: 001-3/2005
- Registration: N46463 (2005–2013); VH-YOV (2013–2019); ZK-YOV (2019–present)

Steadfast is a Yak-3U replica built by the Romanian company Avioane Craiova in 2005. The aircraft holds nine world records, including the under-3,000 kg (6,600 lb) World Speed Record set by Will Whiteside in 2011. Currently, the aircraft is flown at the Omaka Aviation Heritage Centre.

== History ==
In 1992, Avioane Craiova was contracted to build 10 Yak-3U replicas for a French company. These replicas were constructed using a Yak-11 aerobatics airplane located at the Romanian National Military Museum as a model. Nine of them were equipped with the Pratt & Whitney R-1830 Twin Wasp engine. In 2005, a replica was built with the more powerful Pratt & Whitney R-2000 Twin Wasp engine.

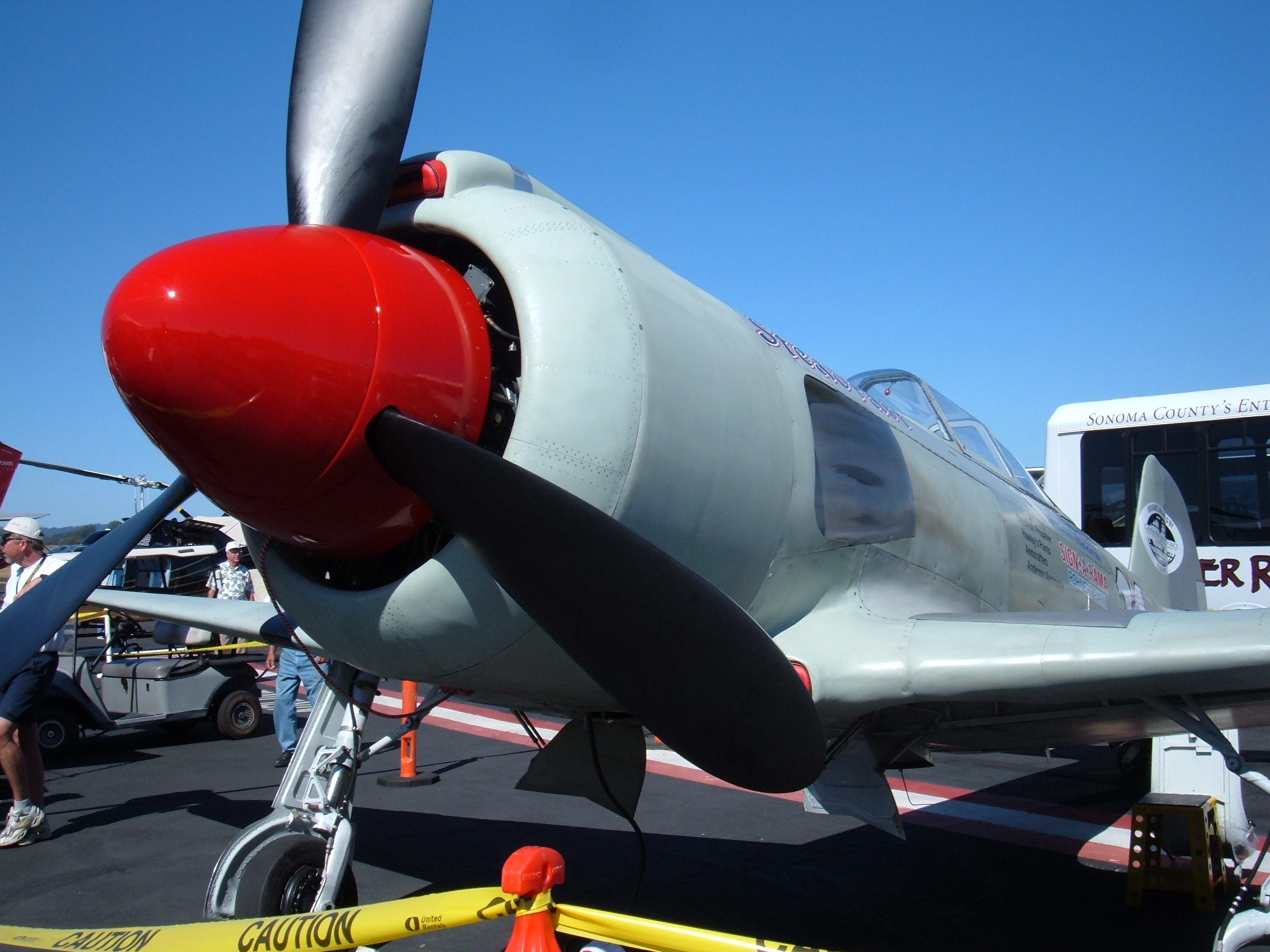
Steadfast in 2007

The R-2000-powered replica was purchased by William E. Whiteside and registered as N46463 in the United States to compete in the Reno Air Races. The aircraft was modified for racing with new cowling, canopy, systems and a spinner taken from an A-26 Invader. It was then nicknamed "SteadFast" after the Reno Stead Airport. It began participating in the Unlimited Class at Reno in September 2006, finishing 1st in the Heat 3 race, and taking 6th place in the Unlimited Silver race. It continued to fly in the races between 2007 and 2012, finishing 4th in the Championship race in 2008 and winning the Unlimited Silver race in 2012.

Around 2011–2012, Steadfast began setting new records as flown by Will Whiteside. The most important one being the 3 km (1.9 mi) under-3,000 kg (6,600 lb) World Speed Record (Class 1d as certified by FAI) set in 2011 at Wendover, Utah with a speed of 669.5 km/h (416.0 mph). The previous record was held by the Hughes H-1 Racer replica flown by Jim Wright. Steadfast also set the Class 1e (3000–6000 kg) record in 2012, as the previous record held by Lyle Shelton with Rare Bear was retired due to changes in the sporting code. This Class 1e record has since been broken in 2017 by Steven Hinton Jr. flying in Voodoo. Other world records set by Steadfast include several "time to climb" records as well, such as the climb to 3,000 m (10,000 ft) in 125 seconds.

In 2013, the aircraft was moved to Australia and registered as VH-YOV. Steadfast was ultimately purchased by Mark O'Sullivan and taken to the Omaka Aviation Heritage Centre in 2019, being registered as ZK-YOV in New Zealand. It has since been displayed at various air shows throughout the country.

== Timeline ==
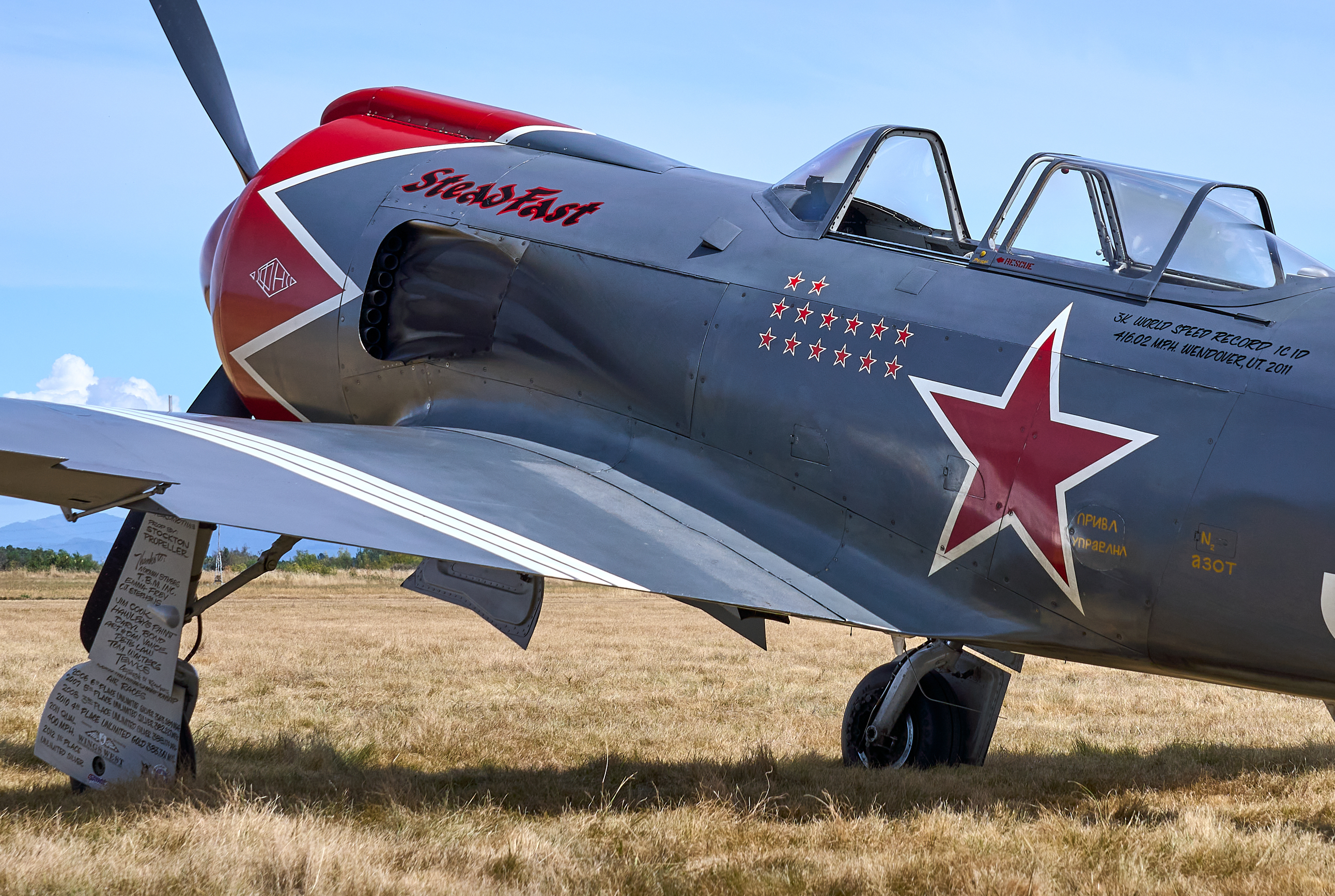
Steadfast in 2021 (Note: Racing performances seen marked on the landing gear and the world speed record marked under the canopy)

- 2005: constructed in Craiova, imported by Eddie Andreini to Half Moon Bay, California; purchased by William Whiteside; registered N46463
- 2006: 6th place Reno Unlimited Silver
- 2007: 5th place Reno Unlimited Silver
- 2008: 3rd place Reno Unlimited Silver
- 2010: 4th place Reno Unlimited Gold
- 2011: 4th place Heat 2C at Reno; FAI 3 km (1.9 mi) World Speed Record Class 1d
- 2012: 1st place Reno Unlimited Silver; FAI 3 km (1.9 mi) World Speed Record Class 1e; Time to Climb to 3,000 m (10,000 ft) record
- 2013: purchased by Eastern Fighters Pty Ltd, Perth, Western Australia; registered VH-YOV
- 2015: to Team Steadfast Pty Ltd, Kelvin Grove, Queensland
- 2019: purchased by Mark O'Sullivan and Ronan Harvey, to Omaka Aviation Heritage Centre in New Zealand; registered ZK-YOV

== See also ==
- Voodoo
- Rare Bear

== Bibliography ==
- O'Sullivan, Mark; Conroy, Gavin (2022). "Owning and Displaying 'Steadfast'" (PDF). KiwiFlyer. No. 79. ISSN 1170-8018.
