= Lyle Shelton =

Lyle Shelton may refer to:

- Lyle Shelton (aviator) (1933–2010), American aviator
- Lyle Shelton (lobbyist), Australian conservative political figure
