= Precious Metal (aircraft) =

Custom racing aircraft

P-51XR Precious Metal
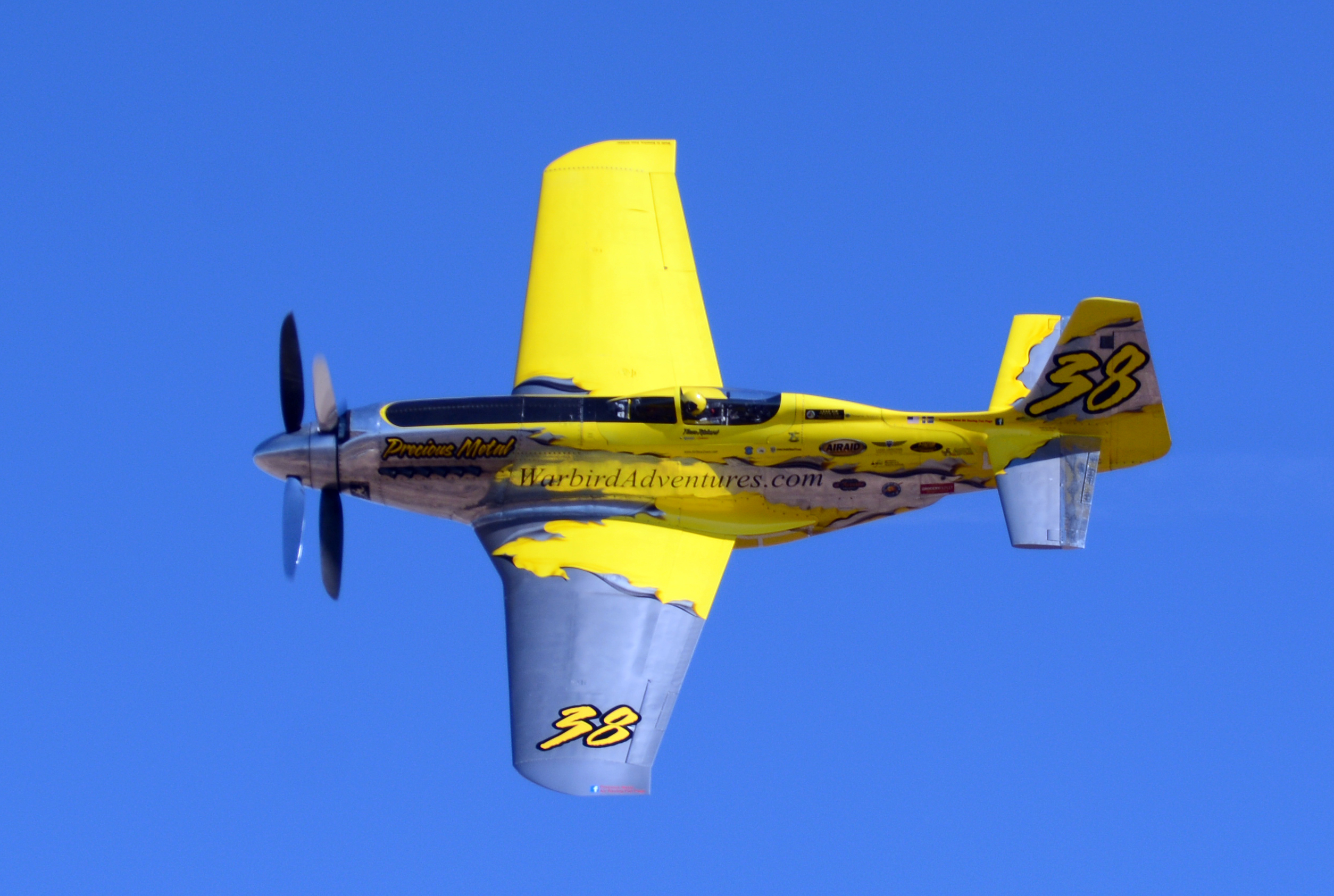
- Precious Metal during the 2014 Reno Air Races

General information
- Other names: Race 9 (1988–1995?); Race 38 (1995?–present)
- Type: Racing aircraft
- National origin: United States
- Manufacturer: World Jet Inc.
- Designer: Don Whittington
- Owners: Don Whittington (1988–2000); Ron Buccarelli (2000–2011); Thom Richard (2011–present)
- Number built: 1
- Construction number: 44-88
- Registration: N5483V (1988); N6WJ (1989–present)

History
- Introduction date: September 12, 1988
- First flight: August 10, 1988
- Developed from: North American P-51 Mustang
- Fate: Damaged in ground fire, under repairs

Precious Metal is a custom-built racing aircraft based on the North American P-51 Mustang.

== Design and development ==
Precious Metal was built by World Jet Inc., a company owned by Don Whittington, in 1988. Its fuselage, acquired from Tallmantz Aviation, was from a P-51D Mustang. The aircraft was fitted with stock P-51 wings, and its powerplant, a Rolls-Royce Griffon 57A driving contra-rotating propellers, came from an Avro Shackleton. In its original form, the Precious Metal was fitted with the P-51H tail from Whittington's original Precious Metal aircraft, and therefore also had the same registration.

== History ==
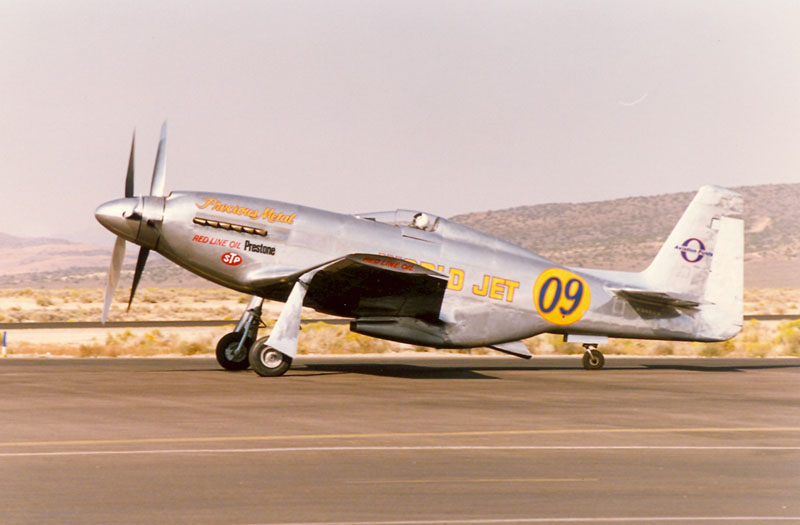
Precious Metal during the 1988 Reno Air Races with its original P-51H tail.

Precious Metal made its first flight on August 10, 1988, with the race number 9. It made its debut at the Reno Air Races on September 12 of that year. The plane shared its name, race number, and registration with Whittington's other P-51 race plane, leading many to believe that it was the same aircraft. During a qualifying run, the aircraft achieved a speed of 453 mph (729 km/h), the highest recorded qualifying speed at the time. However, its success would be short-lived, as during the race the aircraft suffered an engine failure and was forced to make a belly landing.

Following the race, Precious Metal was taken to Fort Lauderdale, Florida, for repairs. The P-51H tail was removed and refitted to the original Precious Metal, while the Griffon-powered Precious Metal was fitted with a standard P-51D tail. In April 1989, the aircraft was officially registered N6WJ, with its type designation being P-51XR.

The aircraft was supposed to be flown by Bill Whittington in the 1993 Reno Air Races, but it never appeared at the race. It finally made an appearance in the 1995 Reno Air Races with the race number 38. For this race, the tall P-51H tail was once again fitted, but the aircraft did not carry the Precious Metal name, instead racing as the "World Jet" P-51. Don Whittington came first in the Unlimited Silver Class race but forfeited his win to race in the Gold class, coming sixth.

Don Whittington lost interest in air racing following the death of Gary Levitz in 1999 and put Precious Metal in storage. Levitz, a friend of Whittington, died during the Reno Air Races when his own Griffon-powered Mustang, Miss Ashley II, broke up in flight. In 2000, Precious Metal was bought by Ron Buccarelli, who intended to return the aircraft to Reno in 2001. The 2001 Reno Air Races were canceled following the September 11 attacks, but Precious Metal returned to Reno the following year. Buccarelli described flying Precious Metal as a "handful", in contrast Rare Bear, which he had a chance to fly in 2006.

In 2011, Precious Metal was sold to Thom Richard, who made several modifications to the aircraft, including a feathering pump. Richard was not able to race that year, as the Reno Air Races were canceled after the fatal crash of The Galloping Ghost. In 2012, Richard flew Precious Metal in the Gold Class race, but he did not finish because one of the landing gear doors came off in flight.

After many new modifications, Precious Metal returned to Reno in 2013. The modifications included a new streamlined canopy, many carbon fiber parts to reduce weight, as well as many modifications to the engine to bring it up to 3,200 hp. Thom Richard placed fifth in the Gold Class that year.

Precious Metal was heavily damaged by a fire days before the 2015 Reno Air Races. One of the ground crew noticed the fire while the aircraft was taxiing and signaled Richard to shut down the engine. Richard shut down the engine and escaped the aircraft, which burned for 12 minutes before firefighters arrived to the scene. It took 20 minutes to put out the fire, and by that time the airframe had sustained severe damage. After the fire, Richard stated that Precious Metal would not race again. A lengthy restoration process of Precious Metal to airworthy condition began in 2016.

=== Racing history ===
- 1988 Reno Air Races, crashed
- 1993 Reno Air Races, entered but did not show up
- 1995 Reno Air Races, 1st place Silver Class/6th place Gold Class
- 2001 Reno Air Races, races canceled
- 2002 Reno Air Races, 4th place Silver Class
- 2003 Reno Air Races, 1st place Bronze Class
- 2004 Reno Air Races, 3rd place Silver Class
- 2006 Reno Air Races, 3rd place Silver Class
- 2007 Reno Air Races, Silver Class, disqualified
- 2011 Reno Air Races, races canceled
- 2012 Reno Air Races, Gold Class, DNF
- 2013 Reno Air Races, 5th place Gold Class
- 2014 Reno Air Races, Gold Class, disqualified

== Other Precious Metal aircraft ==
Two other P-51 Mustangs have carried the Precious Metal name.

=== Precious Metal (N5483V) ===
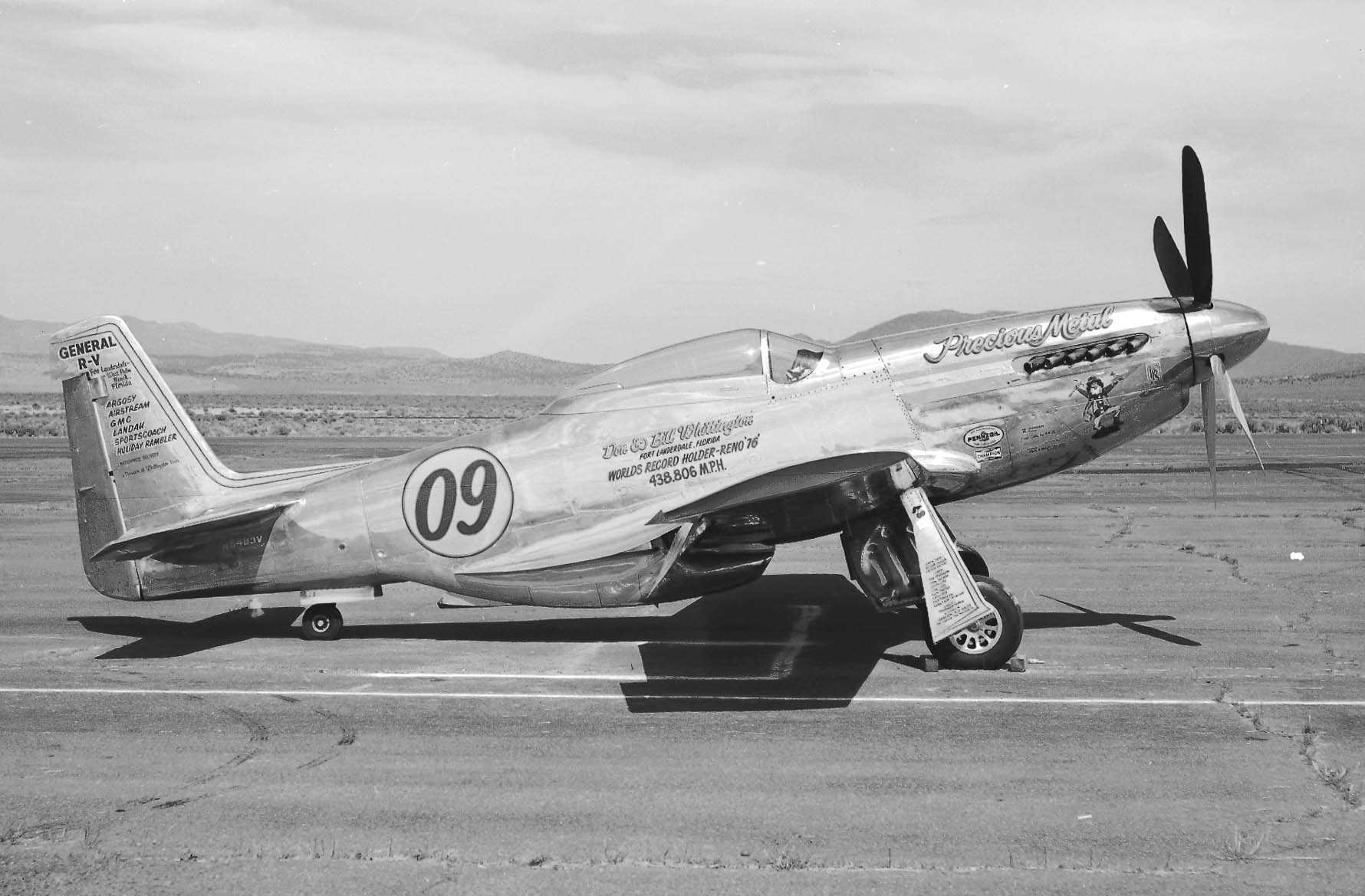
Precious Metal (N5483V) in 1977.

Don Whittington's original Precious Metal was a P-51D-25-NA registered N5483V, s/n 44-73518. The aircraft was delivered to the USAAF and was shipped overseas in March 1945, only to be shipped back to the US in July of that year. It was used for various second line roles until 1958, when it was sold as surplus to an unknown buyer. Edward G. Fisher Jr. bought the aircraft in 1963, and to Gary R. Levitz in 1974. Levitz modified the aircraft as a race plane and fitted it with a tall tail from a P-51H, naming it Precious Metal, and sold it to Don Whittington in 1976. Whittington briefly flew the aircraft as Miss Florida II before renaming it back to Precious Metal.

The aircraft was placed in storage in 1984, and in 1988 its tail section was used to build the Griffon-powered Precious Metal. It was taken out of storage and fitted with a stock tail following the crash of its Griffon-powered counterpart. In 1990, the aircraft ditched into the sea near Galveston, Texas, due to fuel starvation and bad weather. The aircraft was subsequently salvaged and sold to Ron Buccarelli, and as of 2018 is under restoration.

=== Precious Metal II (N8082U) ===
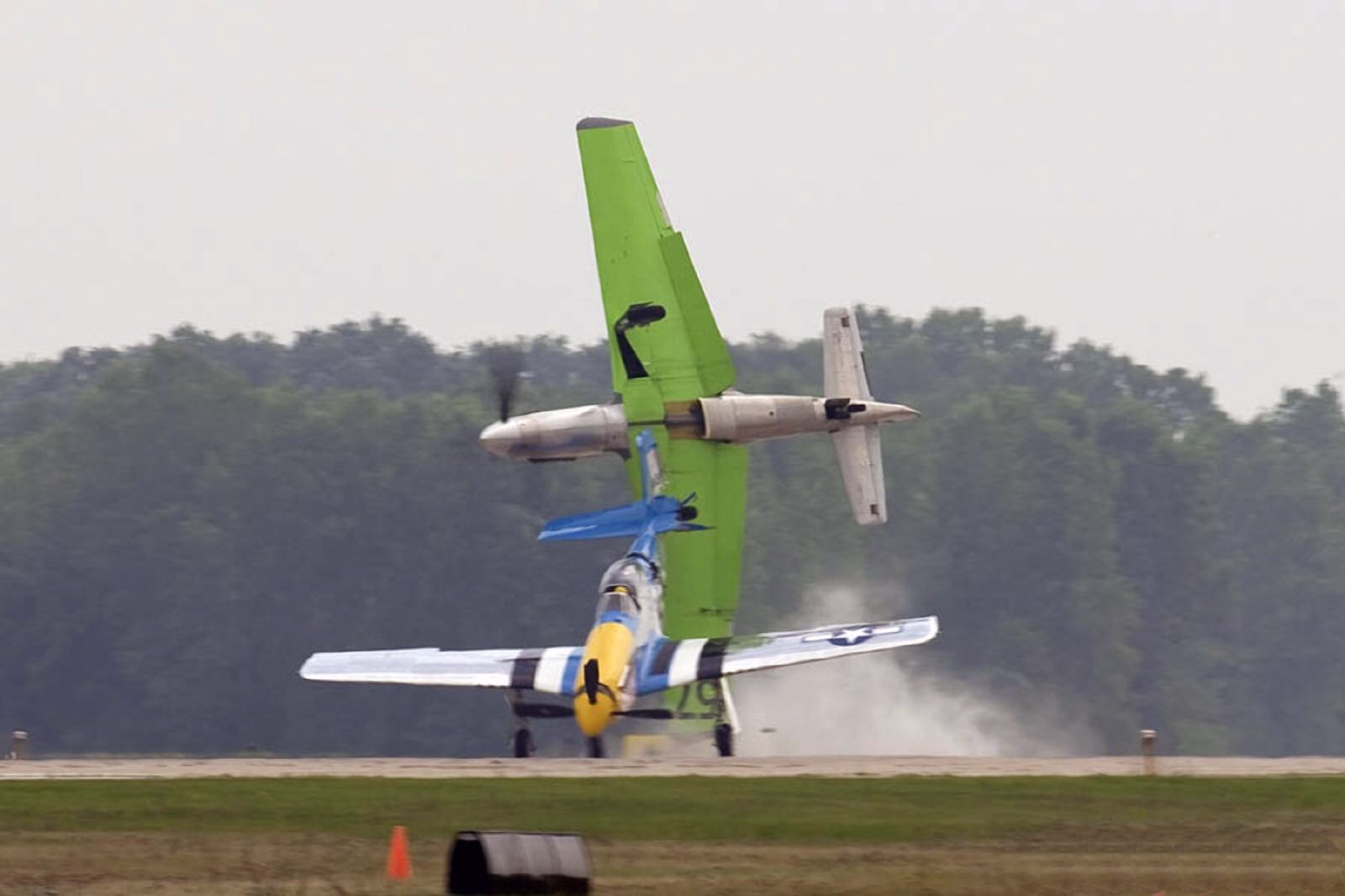
Precious Metal II (background) colliding with Stang on July 27, 2007.

Precious Metal II is a replica of a P-51A that was constructed by Gerald S. Beck in 2001. The aircraft first used the name Precious Metal II for the movie Thunder Over Reno in 2006. In 2007 it was revealed that Beck had gathered parts and planned to build more P-51 replicas. However, these plans were never realized as on July 27 of that year, Precious Metal II collided with P-51D Stang on landing after performing a simulated air race during EAA AirVenture Oshkosh. Beck was killed when Precious Metal II flipped over and impacted the ground inverted, while Stang pilot Casey Odegaard survived.

Ownership of the Precious Metal II wreck was subsequently transferred to Beck's wife, Cynthia. In 2010, she began to restore the aircraft in her husband's memory.

== See also ==
Related development

- North American P-51 Mustang

Aircraft of comparable role, configuration, and era

- Dago Red
- Miss Ashley II
- Rare Bear
- Red Baron
- September Fury
- The Galloping Ghost
- Tsunami
- Voodoo
