= RB 51 =

RB 51 is the designation of several regional rail services in Germany:

- RB 51, operated by agilis between Neumarkt (Oberpfalz) and Plattling
- RB 51, operated by DB Regio Mitte between Frankfurt (Main) and Wächtersbach
- RB 51, operated by DB Regio Mitte between Neustadt (Weinstraße) and Karlsruhe
- RB 51, operated by DB Regio NRW between Enschede and Dortmund
- RB 51, operated by DB Regio Südost between Dessau and Falkenberg (Elster)
- RB 51, operated by Ostdeutsche Eisenbahn between Rathenow and Brandenburg

== See also ==
- Red Baron (aircraft)
