= Tsunami (aircraft) =

Experimental purpose-built racing aircraft

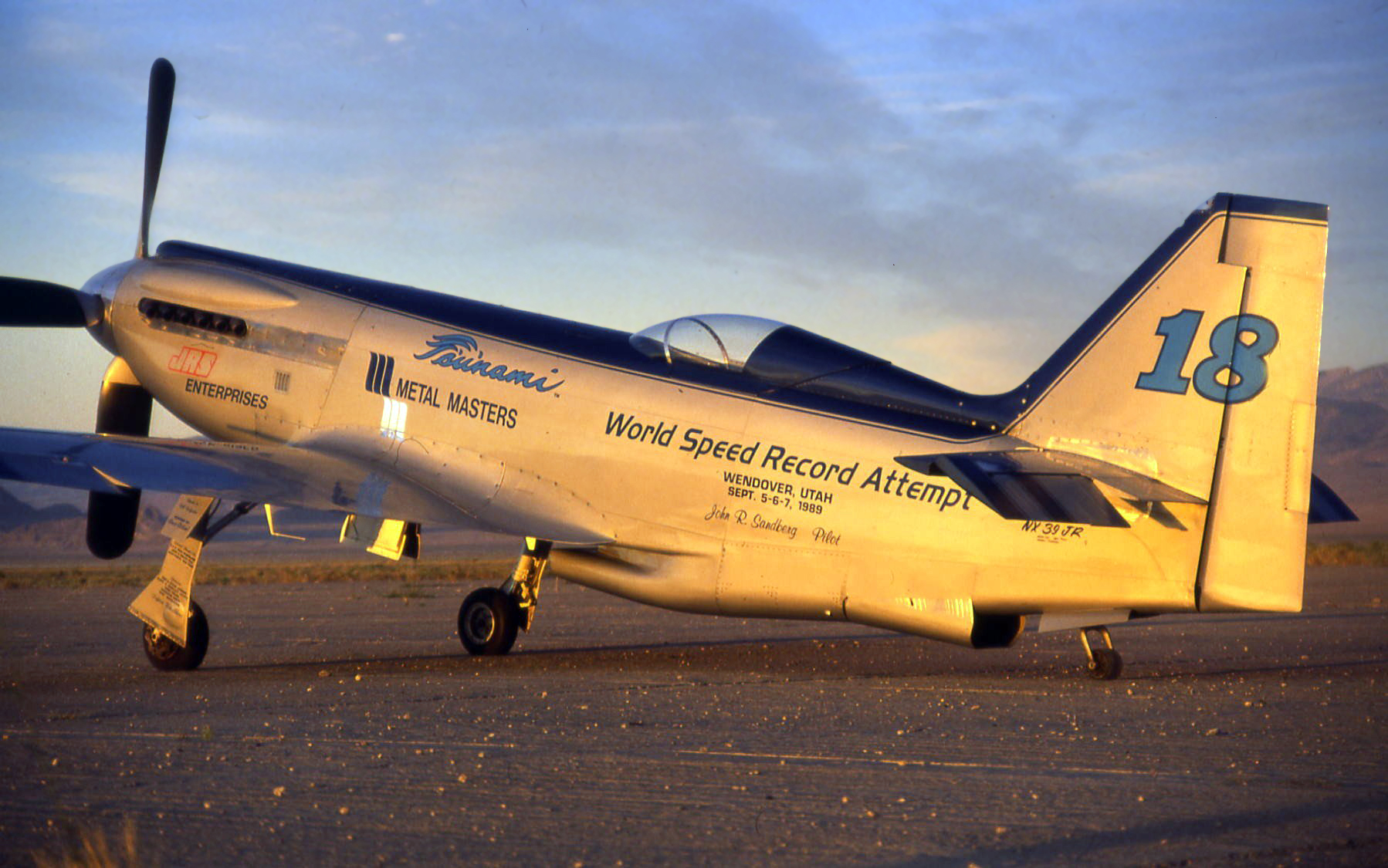

General information
- Type: Racing aircraft
- National origin: United States
- Designer: Bruce Boland; John R. Sandberg; Pete Law; Ray Poe
- Primary users: John R. Sandberg Steve Hinton; Skip Holm
- Number built: 1

History
- Manufactured: 1986
- First flight: August 17, 1986

Tsunami was a purpose-built racing aircraft designed and built in the United States during the 1980s. After a short undistinguished career Tsunami crashed, killing its designer, John Sandberg, on 25 September 1991.

== Design and development ==
After six years of building, the aircraft was first flown 17 August 1986 by Steve Hinton. It was designed specifically to break the 3 km world speed record for propeller driven aircraft by a private pilot and to compete in the Unlimited class at the Reno Air Races. The aircraft was designed by Bruce Boland, an aerospace engineer employed by Lockheed Martin, John R. Sandberg, owner of JRS Enterprises Inc (rebuilders of Allison and Rolls-Royce aircraft engines), Lockheed engineer Pete Law and builder Ray Poe. Tsunami, powered by a Rolls-Royce Merlin engine, designed and built by John R. Sandberg and the JRS Enterprise Inc. team, exceeded 500 mph (430 kn; 800 km/h).

Originally, it was designed as a light-weight racer with a single-staged supercharged Rolls-Royce Merlin. However, as speed increased in the Unlimited Racing Class, a higher powered two-stage supercharged Rolls-Royce Merlin was installed. An attempt was made in August 1989 to break the 3 km (1.9 mi) world speed record at Wendover Utah with a private pilot at the controls. Due to a landing gear collapse the aircraft was unable to beat the existing record.

== Operational history ==
Despite being very fast, in its racing career from 1986 to 1991 it only won one Unlimited Gold Race, in Sherman, Texas in 1990.

=== Fatality ===
The plane career ended in 1991 when the owner John Sandberg was killed while ferrying the aircraft to his home airport. The US National Transportation Safety Board report stated that the airspeed indicator was off on Tsunami's last flight and a mechanical failure in the flap system, caused the aircraft to roll on final approach into Pierre Regional Airport, South Dakota on 25 September 1991.

== Specifications (Tsunami) ==
Data from

General characteristics

- Crew: 1
- Length: 28 ft 6 in (8.69 m)
- Wingspan: 27 ft 6 in (8.38 m)
- Wing area: 150 sq ft (14 m^{2})
- Aspect ratio: 5.04
- Airfoil: NACA 63-212 modified
- Empty weight: 5,600 lb (2,540 kg)
- Gross weight: 7,200 lb (3,266 kg)
- Fuel capacity: 230 US gal (190 imp gal; 870 L)
- Powerplant: 1 × Rolls-Royce Merlin Race modified V-12. 3,200 RPM & 100 in.Hg. manifold pressure., 3,500 hp (2,600 kW)

Performance

- Maximum speed: 430 kn (500 mph, 800 km/h) Attained 500mph on several occasions, maximum speed unknown.
- Wing loading: 48 lb/sq ft (230 kg/m^{2})
- Power/mass: 0.486

== See also ==
Aircraft of comparable role, configuration, and era

- Dago Red
- Miss Ashley II
- Precious Metal
- Rare Bear
- Red Baron
- September Fury
- The Galloping Ghost
- Voodoo
