= Dago Red =

Heavily modified P-51D Mustang

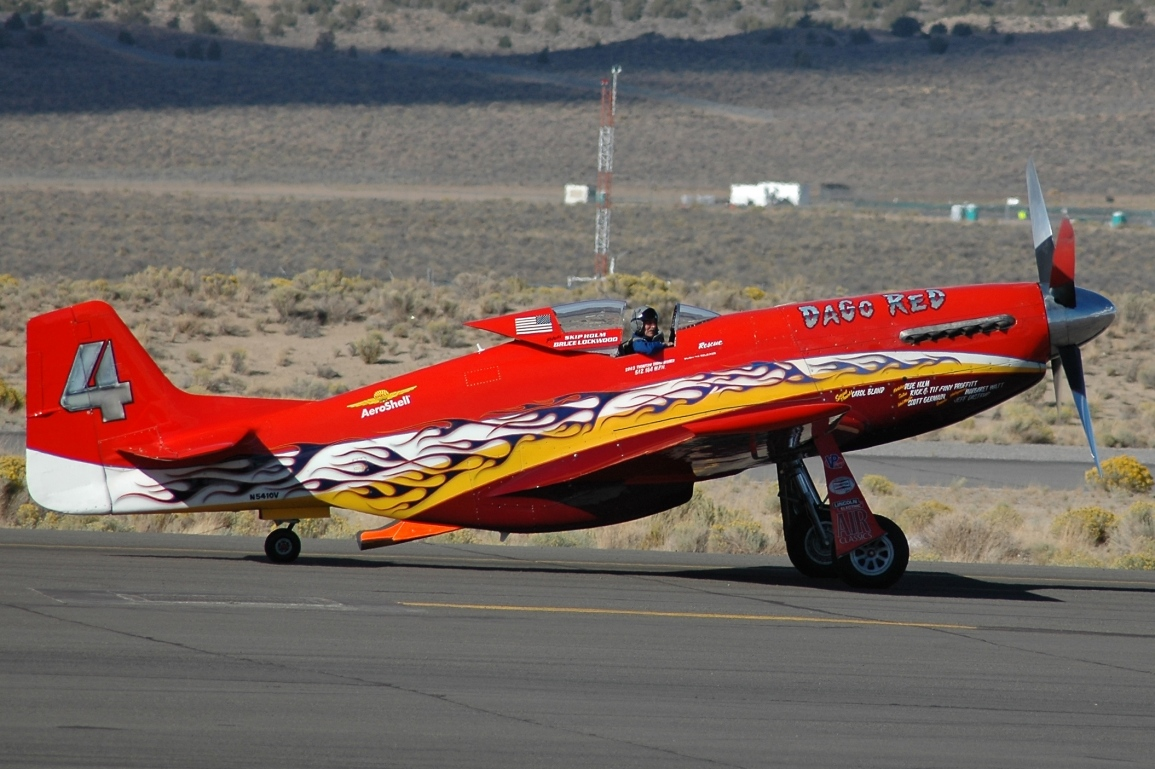

General information
- Type: Unlimited class racing aircraft
- Manufacturer: North American
- Owners: Hoffman Aircraft Holdings LLC
- Registration: N5410V
- Serial: 44-74996

History
- First flight: P-51D 1944, Dago Red 1981
- Fate: As of 2010, sold to Hoffman Aircraft Holdings LLC, Anchorage AK from re-possession

Dago Red is a North American P-51 Mustang (44-74996), restored as a competitive air racer by Frank Taylor in 1981. Dago Red holds several world records, including the 15 km (517.323 mph) set in 1983. Frank Taylor piloted the plane to most of its world records in the 1980s.

== Awards ==
- Six time winner of the National Championship Air Races (1982, 1998, 1999, 2000, 2002 and 2003)
- Mojave, California 1983 - World Speed Record 15 km (517.323 mph)
- Unlimited Reno Air Races 1982 - Gold Winner
- Reno Air Races 2003 - Thompson Trophy, Fastest Lap (512.164 mph), Fastest Race (507.105 mph)
- Reno Air Races 2001 - Fastest Qualifying Speed (497.797 mph)

== Specifications ==
General characteristics

- Crew: 1
- Length: 32 ft 3 in (9.83 m)
- Wingspan: 32 ft 3 in (9.84 m)
- Height: 13 ft 0 in (3.96 m)
- Wing area: 150 sq ft (14 m^{2})
- Empty weight: 7,200 lb (3,266 kg)
- Gross weight: 7,800 lb (3,538 kg)
- Max takeoff weight: 8,500 lb (3,856 kg)
- Powerplant: 1 × Rolls-Royce Merlin V-12 liquid-cooled piston engine race tuned, estimated 3,500 to 3,800 hp (2,600 to 2,800 kW)
- Propellers: 4-bladed Hamilton Standard paddle bladed propeller

Performance

- Maximum speed: 450 kn (520 mph, 840 km/h)
- Range: 100 nmi (120 mi, 190 km)
- Service ceiling: 45,000 ft (14,000 m)
- Rate of climb: 8,000 ft/min (41 m/s)

== See also ==
- Miss Ashley II
- Precious Metal
- Rare Bear
- Red Baron
- September Fury
- The Galloping Ghost
- Tsunami
- Voodoo
