= September Fury =

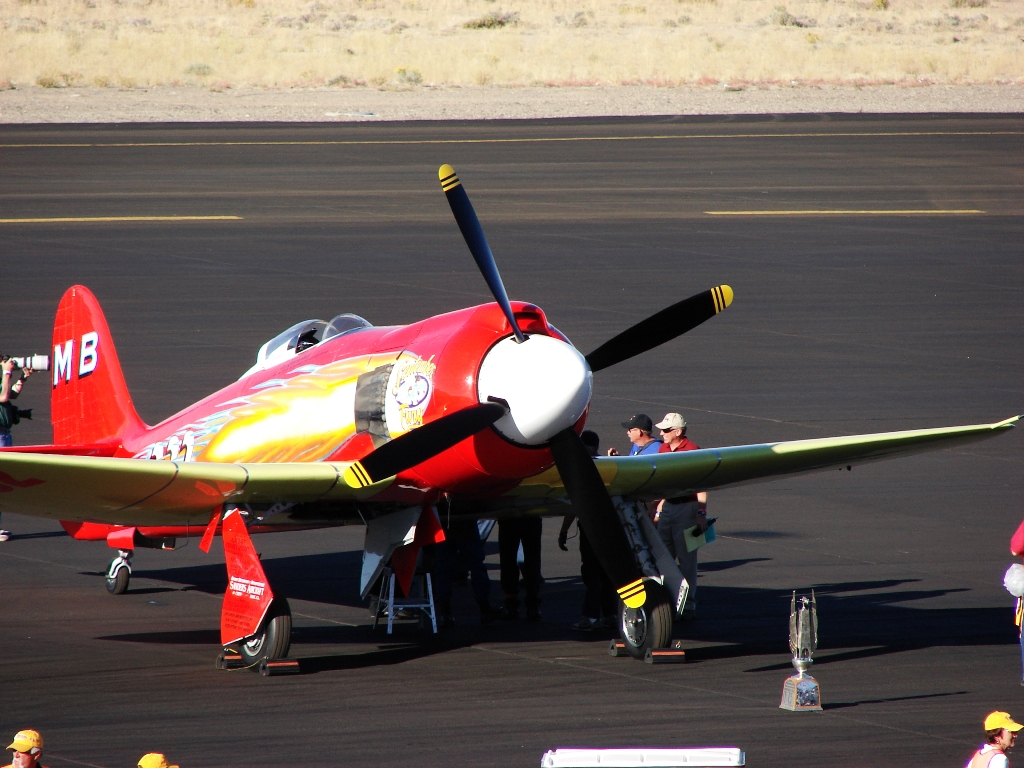

General information
- Type: Hawker Sea Fury
- Registration: N232J

History
- Fate: Highly modified as an unlimited class racing aircraft

September Fury is a highly modified Hawker Sea Fury that is a regular racer at the Reno Air Races. It races as number 232.

== History ==
September Fury was one of two abandoned Sea Fury wrecks recovered in 1962 from a farmer's field in New Brunswick, Canada. It survived a hangar fire that damaged the other airframe, and was restored to airworthiness by Brian Baird. After a landing gear failure wrecked the aircraft, it was bought along with another partial airframe by the Sanders Family in November 1969. Frank Sanders restored the aircraft to airworthiness and registered it as N232J, and raced in the California 1000 at Mojave in 1971. The aircraft would later be bought by Mike Brown, rebuilt with a Wright R-3350 engine and named September Fury. It won the Gold Unlimited race at Reno in 1996. Sanders also eventually restored the other Sea Fury airframe which would be named Argonaut.

== Racing career ==
N232J was entered in the California 1000 race and finished in fourth place. Again it raced in the July 1971 United States Cup Race, with Sanders piloting it to second place. In November the aircraft flew again in the California 1000 race, ending with first place.

In 1975 the aircraft raced again at the California National Air Races and finished in 6th place.

The aircraft changed owners in 1978 and again in 1988. That September the aircraft was raced as23 at the National Championship Air Races in Reno, Nevada. In late 1989 the aircraft was sold and moved to the United Kingdom, not to return to the United States again until 1995.

Michael Brown bought the aircraft in 1996 and the aircraft was again registered as N232J and was rebuilt. The Mk. 18 Bristol Centaurus engine was removed and replaced with a more powerful Curtis Wright R-3350-93 engine.

The rebuilt 232, racing under the name September Fury, returned to the Reno Air Races in 2000, with the 4th fastest qualifying time. However, it did not race in the final race due to a blown engine.

September Fury would have the engine replaced with a modified R-3350 and the aircraft modified further, ready to race in 2001.

In 2002 September Fury finished in second place in the Unlimited Gold division at the Reno Air Races. During the qualifying round that year, it was recorded going 468.266 miles per hour (753.601 km/h). This made it the fastest Sea Fury in the world.

The 2003 Pylon Racing Seminar saw a repainted September Fury with a more wild scheme. September Fury however blew an engine at the Reno Air Races that year and did not get to compete.

In 2004, September Fury finished in 3rd place in Unlimited Gold at the Reno National Championship Air Races.

In 2006 September Fury took first place at the Reno Air Races, Unlimited Breitling Gold race.

September Fury competed in the 2007 Reno Air Races however did not finish the Unlimited Breitling Gold race due to a blown engine.

The 2008 Reno Air Races, Unlimited Breitling Gold race concluded with September Fury in third position.

In 2009, September Fury changed owners, and did not race again until 2011 when it had a 4th place finish at the 2011 Reno National Championship Air Races, Unlimited Gold

In 2012 September Fury finished 2nd to Strega at the 2012 Reno National Championship Air Races, Unlimited Gold.

In 2013, the aircraft, racing again as 232 had the 2nd fastest qualifying time in the 2013 Reno National Championship Air Races, Unlimited division. However mechanical failure left the aircraft unable to race in the Unlimited Gold final race.

On April 29, 2019, it was reported by an aircraft dealer that September Fury was sold and would be back in the air soon; however, no indication was given whether it would remain its air racing configuration or be converted back to stock. Later in 2019, it was reported that 232 had returned to the Sanders Aeronautics and Sanders Smoke Technologies workshop, where it had been originally restored to airworthiness in 1970, to be returned to a "closer-to-stock form".

== See also ==
Aircraft of comparable role, configuration, and era

- Dago Red
- Miss Ashley II
- Precious Metal
- Rare Bear
- Red Baron
- The Galloping Ghost
- Tsunami
- Voodoo
