= Voodoo (aircraft) =

Racing aircraft

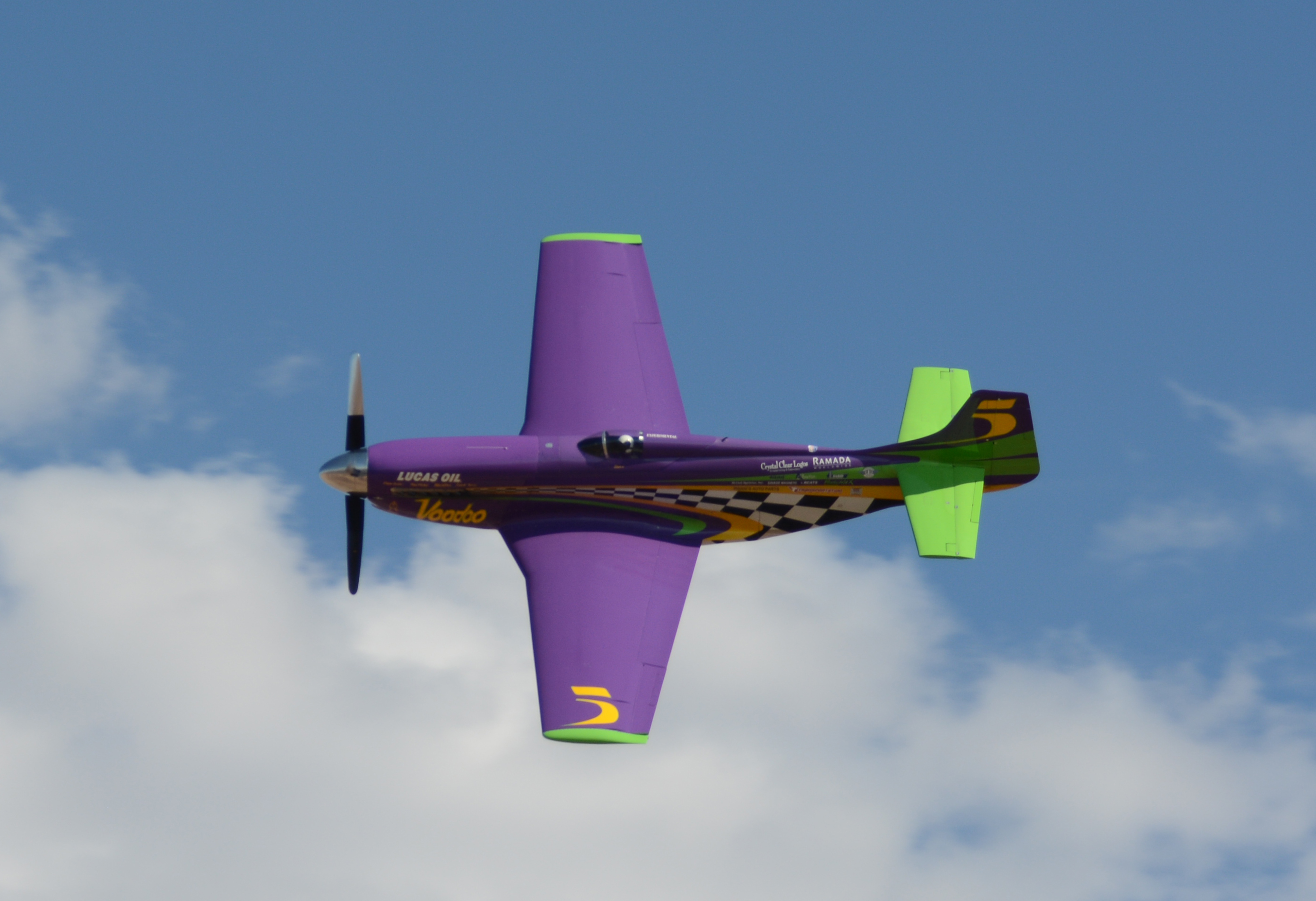
- Pilot Steven Hinton, Jr. flies Voodoo to victory in the 2014 Gold Championship

General information
- Type: North American P-51D-25-NA Mustang
- Serial: USAAF 44-73415; RCAF 9289

Voodoo is a highly modified North American P-51 Mustang that was the 2013, 2014 and 2016 Unlimited-class champion of the Reno Air Races. The pilot for these wins was Steven Hinton Jr of Chino, California.

== History ==
The P-51D-25-NA (original s/n 44-73415) was built in 1944 by North American Aviation at Inglewood, California, for the U.S. Army Air Force. The aircraft was then transferred to the Royal Canadian Air Force as a Mustang IV with serial number 9289 in February 1951.

In February 1951, it went down at Richmond, Virginia, and was badly damaged. Again, in February 1962, the aircraft crashed. In March 1977, the aircraft suffered yet another crash. According to the summarized National Transportation Safety Board narrative from report number SEA77FYE12:

There were 2 fatalities. Incident occurred at 13:46 hours. The airframe was destroyed. Incident occurred at Olympia Municipal Airport, Olympia, Washington. The aircraft Ground looped or water swerved during the takeoff run. Stalled or mushed during the initial climb. The factors included; unapproved modification. FAA examiner remarks include: Partially completed dual control modification.

In 1980, the aircraft was sold to William A. Speer, of La Mesa, California, who restored it. In 1988, it made its first restored flight. It first raced as #45, then as #55 using the name Pegasus. The plane was sold at auction in December 1994.

Bob Button of Button Transportation Inc., Wellington, Nevada, owned the plane from 1995 to 1998. He renamed it Voodoo Chile, and raced it as #55. In 1998, the highly modified P-51 raced at the National Championship Air Races in Reno as #5 "Voodoo" piloted by Bob Hannah. The left elevator trim tab came off the airplane at speed, causing Voodoo to abruptly pitch up, subjecting Hannah to forces over 10 g, and causing him to lose consciousness. In 2007, Bob Button retired from air racing after a malfunction. In the 2011 Reno air races, Voodoo and The Galloping Ghost were running in second and third place, respectively, when the latter crashed. In 2013, Voodoo, still owned by Bob Button, was raced at Reno by Steven Hinton Jr., who won the unlimited gold trophy and the national championship while reaching speeds of over 500 mph (800 km/h). Hinton won again in 2014 and 2016.

After Voodoo underwent further modifications, including removal of the aircraft's racer paint scheme and gaining sponsorship by Aviation Partners, Hinton made an attempt to break the 3 km World Speed Record of 528.33 mph (850.26 km/h) set by Rare Bear on 21 August 1989. The record attempt was set to occur on 27 August 2017 at an undisclosed location in Idaho but was delayed until the next day due to weather conditions. The attempt was finally flown on 2 September 2017, with the fastest of four runs recorded as 554.69 mph (892.69 km/h) and an average speed of 531.53 mph (855.41 km/h). While this broke the C-1e record set by Will Whiteside in the Yak-3U Steadfast in 2012, due to changes in record measurement standards the Rare Bear record was not bettered as it had to be beaten by at least 1% (533.6 mph).

== Timeline ==
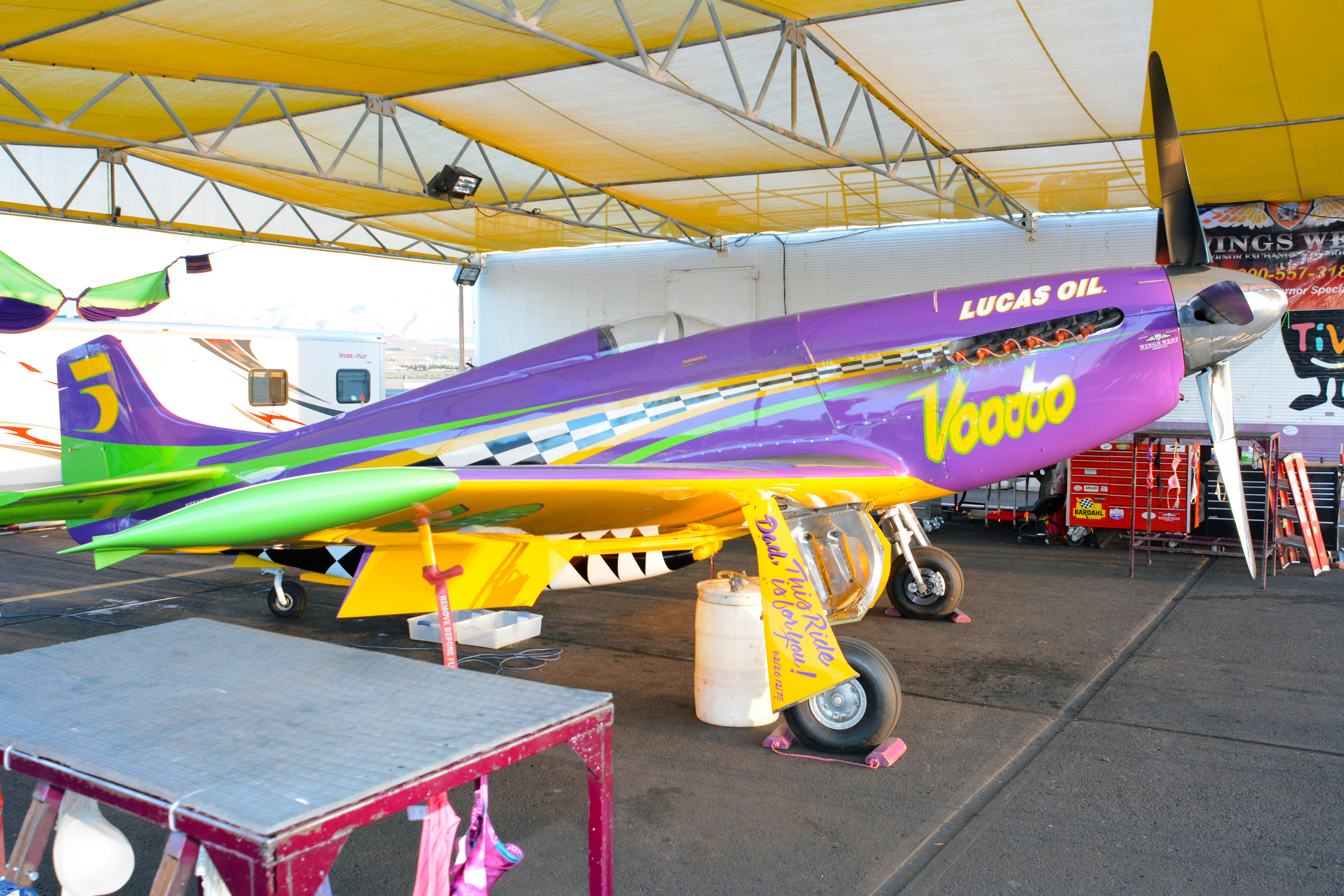
"Voodoo" at the Reno Air Races, September 14, 2014

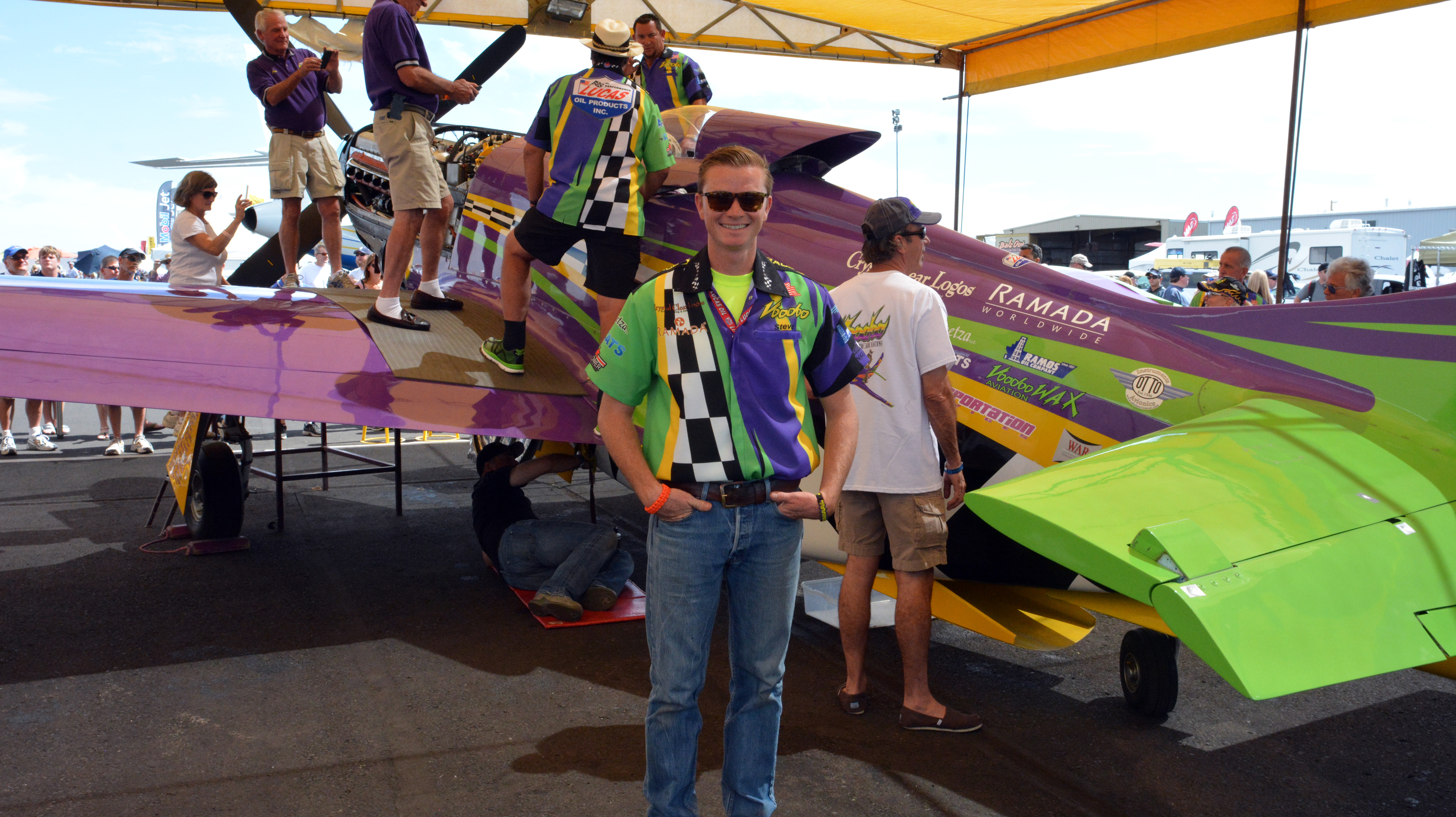
Pilot Steven Hinton Jr with Voodoo at the 2014 Reno Air Races

- 8 February 1951: BOC, RCAF 9289
- 14 August 1959: SOC, RCAF 9289
- 1958: N6526D, import, James Defuria / Intercontinental Airways, Canastota, New York
- 1960: N6526D, sold to R. Ferrer, Patchoque, New York
- 1962: N6526D, crashed, Virginia
- 1966: N6526D, sold to Frank Guzman, Massapequa, Pennsylvania
- 1968: N6526D, sold to Don Bateman, Las Vegas, Nevada
- 1969: N6526D, sold to Mike Coutches, Hayward, California; black w/ gold stripe
- 1974: N6526D, sold to H. Matteri, State Line, Nevada
- 1975: N6526D, sold to William Veatch, Olympia, Washington
- 1977: N6526D, 19 March, crashed, Olympia, Washington; major damage
- 1980: N6526D, sold to Bill Speer, La Mesa, California; restored as Pegasus; modified for racing
- 1996: N6526D, sold to Delbert Williams, Voodoo Chile
- 1997: N551VC, sold to Bob Button, Dixon, California
- 1997: Raced by Tiger Destefani; bare metal, #55 raced as Voodoo Chile
- 1998: Raced by Bob Hannah; painted white, #5 raced as "Voodoo"; left elevator trim tab failure
- 1999: Raced by Bob Hannah; painted purple
- 2006: Raced each year at Reno; Bob Button assumes piloting in 2005
- 2008: Will Whiteside became the race pilot for Team Voodoo
- 2009: Turtle deck and race canopy reinstalled
- 2010: Team Voodoo performed well, but the final race was cancelled due to high winds
- 2011: The final was again cancelled
- 2011: Offered for sale in November; not sold
- 2013: Steven Hinton Jr. and Voodoo Unlimited Gold Champion at Reno, Nevada
- 2014: Steven Hinton Jr. and Voodoo Unlimited Gold Champion at Reno, Nevada.
- 2015: Steven Hinton Jr. and Voodoo did not finish the Unlimited Gold final due to engine issues
- 2016: Steven Hinton Jr. and Voodoo Unlimited Gold Champion at Reno, Nevada with race average speed of 460.306 mph and winning time of 08:21.980
- 2 September 2017: Steven Hinton Jr. and Voodoo break C-1e speed record at Challis, Idaho
- 17 September 2017: Voodoo, painted white, came in second to Strega flown by James Consalvi in the Unlimited Gold race at the Reno National Championship Air Races.
- 28 December 2017 Voodoo donated to Planes of Fame Air Museum in Chino, California. Registration transfer change completed on 5 April 2018.

== See also ==
- Dago Red
- Miss Ashley II
- Precious Metal
- Rare Bear
- Red Baron
- September Fury
- The Galloping Ghost
- Tsunami
