= 2011 Reno Air Races crash =

2011 aviation accident in Nevada

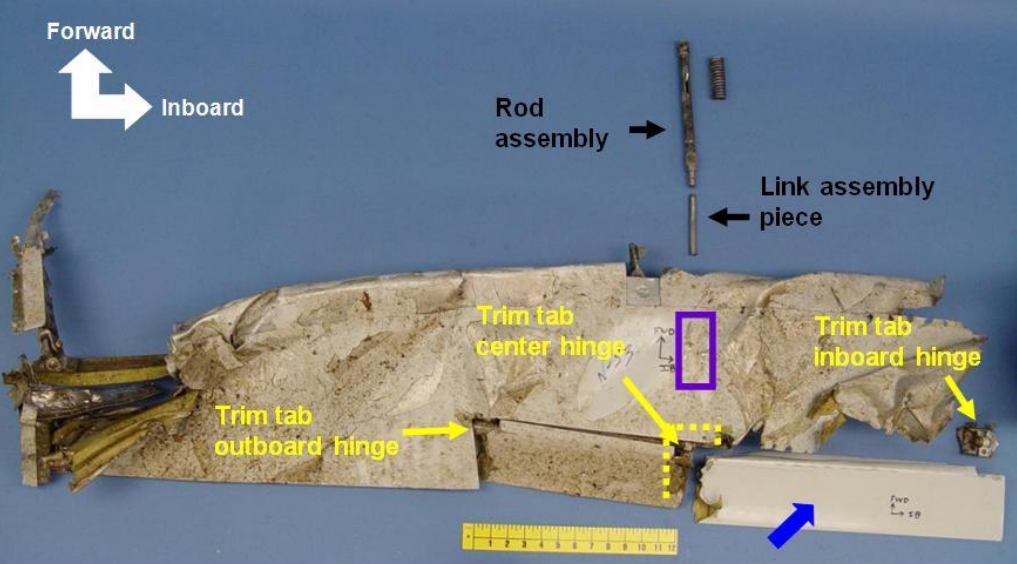
- The recovered left trim tab of the aircraft after the accident

Accident
- Date: September 16, 2011
- Summary: Mechanical failure of trim tab leading to loss of control
- Site: Reno, Nevada, U.S.; 39°39′37.12″N 119°52′40.81″W
- Total fatalities: 11
- Total injuries: 69

Aircraft
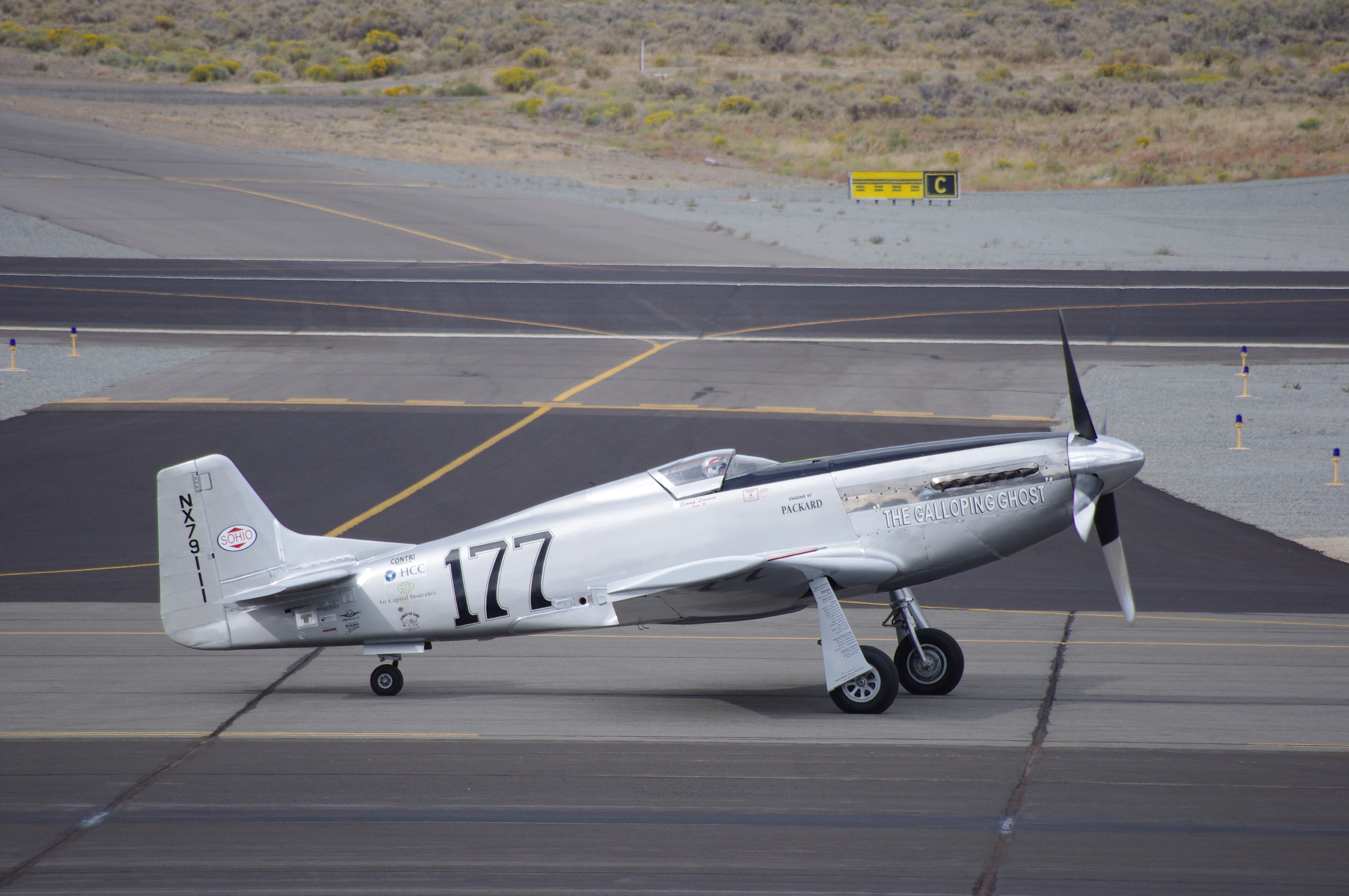
- NX79111, the aircraft involved, seen shortly before the accident
- Aircraft type: North American P-51D-15-NA Mustang
- Aircraft name: The Galloping Ghost
- Operator: Aero Trans Corp.
- Registration: NX79111
- Flight origin: Reno Stead Airport, Reno, Nevada, U.S.
- Destination: Reno Stead Airport
- Occupants: 1
- Crew: 1
- Fatalities: 1
- Survivors: 0

Ground casualties
- Ground fatalities: 10
- Ground injuries: 69

On September 16, 2011, The Galloping Ghost, a highly modified North American P-51D Mustang racing aircraft, crashed into spectators while competing at the Reno Air Races in Reno, Nevada, killing its pilot Jimmy Leeward and ten people on the ground. Sixty-nine more people on the ground were injured. It was the third-deadliest airshow disaster in U.S. history, following accidents in 1972 and 1951.

== Accident ==
During the 2011 Reno Air Races, Jimmy Leeward and The Galloping Ghost were in third place and had just rounded pylon number 8 when the aircraft abruptly pitched up, rolled inverted, then nosedived. The aircraft slammed into the apron at over 400 miles per hour (640 km/h; 350 kn) in front of the grandstands in an area containing box seating, disintegrating on impact. There was no fire; the violence of the crash dispersed all of the fuel on board The Galloping Ghost before it had the chance to ignite.

Seven people, including the pilot, died at the scene; four died later in the hospital. The weekend's remaining races at the Reno Air Races were canceled.

== Aircraft ==
The Galloping Ghost was a highly modified former fighter plane that had come out of retirement the previous year after undergoing major modifications, including removal of the underbelly radiator and installation of a "boil-off" cooling system, as well as other modifications that Leeward described as "designed to make the plane more efficient." The former United States Air Force aircraft, serial number 44-15651, was owned by Aero Trans Corp in Ocala, Florida. The wings had been clipped a further 3 ft (0.9 m) each side on top of the 4 ft (1.2 m) reduction in span earlier in its life.

The aircraft had a long history of successful competition in air races, dating back to the National Air Races from 1946 to 1949 in Cleveland, Ohio. It was flown by a series of pilots under a variety of names, including Miss Candace from 1969 to 1978 and Jeannie in 1981.

Leeward called the modifications of the plane "radical", stating that the oil system was similar to an oil cooling system in the Space Shuttle. The canopy was about the size of the ones on Formula One aircraft. The modifications were meant to improve aerodynamics by reducing drag and hence increase top speed.

== Previous incidents ==
On September 18, 1970, the airplane (then known as Miss Candace) crashed while attempting an emergency landing caused by an engine failure during that year's Reno Air Races at Reno-Stead Airport. During the landing the plane's longer propeller, modified for racing, clipped the runway surface, causing the plane to drift off the edge of the runway, collapsing part of the landing gear but causing only minor injuries to the pilot, Cliff Cummins.

In 1998, another modified P-51 Mustang, Voodoo Chile, lost a left trim tab during the Reno Air Races. The pilot, Bob "Hurricane" Hannah, reported that the airplane pitched up, subjecting him to more than 10 g and knocking him unconscious. When he regained consciousness, the plane had climbed to more than 9,000 feet (2,750 m), and he brought it in for a safe landing. This aircraft (having been renamed to Voodoo) was in attendance at the 2011 race and was nearby at the time of the accident.

In 1999, another highly modified P-51, Miss Ashley II, piloted by Gary Levitz, experienced rudder flutter during an unlimited race at the Reno Air Races. The airframe broke up, killing Levitz.

== Investigation ==
The day after the accident, the National Transportation Safety Board (NTSB) began examining whether part of the empennage had come off before the accident. A photograph taken just before the crash showed the airplane inverted and part of the left elevator trim tab missing.

On October 21, 2011, NTSB investigators said that they found no readable onboard video amid the debris of the racing plane. However, they were still attempting to extract information from an onboard data memory card found among damaged aircraft components and other debris scattered over more than two acres following the crash, as well as hundreds of photos and dozens of videos provided by spectators.

The NTSB thoroughly investigated the extensive modifications made to the airplane. The modifications had made the aircraft lighter and reduced drag but decreased stability. Leeward took the plane to 530 mph (460 kn; 850 km/h) during the race, about 40 mph (35 kn; 64 km/h) faster than he had gone previously. There was evidence of extreme stress on the airframe demonstrated by buckling of the fuselage aft of the wing and gaps appearing between the fuselage and the canopy during the flight (visible in high-resolution photographs taken by spectators).

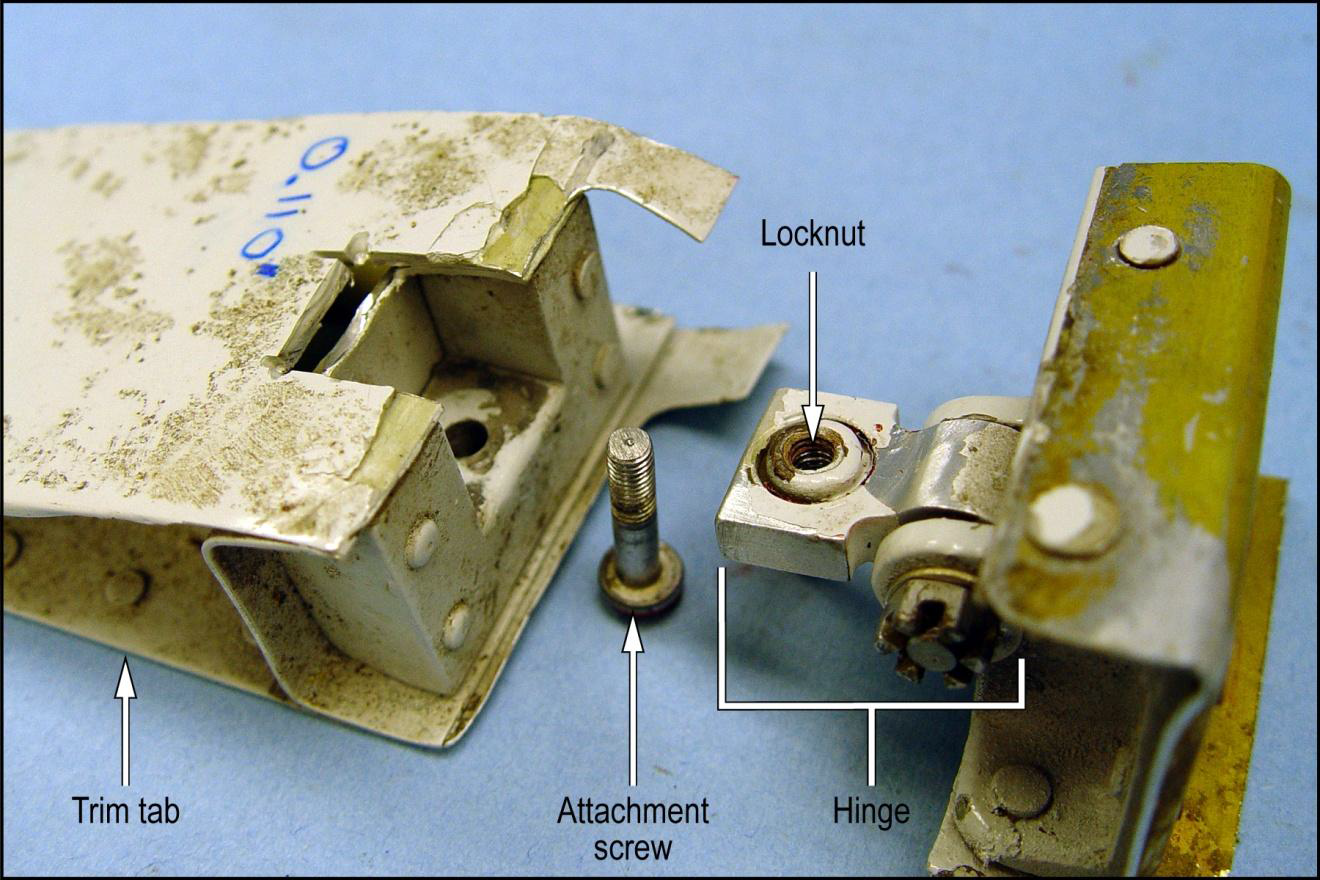
The recovered right trim tab after the accident

The investigation report, released in August 2012, found that the probable cause of the crash was reused single-use locknuts in the left elevator trim tab system that loosened. This led to a fatigue crack in an attachment screw and allowed the trim tab to flutter. This flutter caused the trim tab link assembly to fail, which led to the loss of control of the aircraft. Untested and undocumented modifications to the airplane contributed to the accident. Particularly, the right trim tab had been fixed in place. Had both trim tabs been operational, the loss of the left trim tab alone may not have caused the loss of control. When the trim tab failed, Leeward experienced 17 g, which quickly incapacitated him and likely rendered him unconscious, making it impossible to control the craft.

In 2012, the NTSB released seven safety recommendations to be applied to future air races. These included course design and layout further away from the spectators stands, pre-race inspections, airworthiness of aircraft modifications, Federal Aviation Administration guidance, pilot g-force awareness, and ramp safety.

== Dramatization ==
The Cineflix television show Mayday covered the case in the second episode of season nineteen, titled "Death Race".
