= Steve Hinton =

American air racer

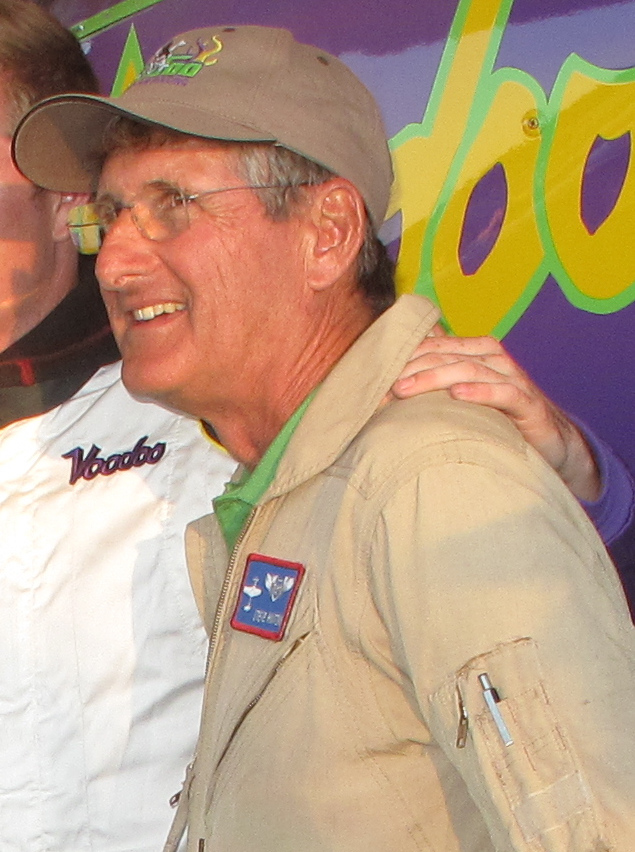
- Hinton in 2013
- Born: April 1, 1952 (age 74); China Lake, California, U.S.
- Known for: Air Racing
- Spouse: Karen Hinton (née Maloney) (m. 1980)

Steve Hinton (born April 1, 1952) is an American aviator who held a world speed record from 1979 to 1989 and won six Unlimited-class air races, including two national championships. He won four consecutive Unlimited races in one year.

== Biography ==
On August 14, 1979, Hinton set the piston-driven aircraft 3-kilometer world speed record at 499.018 mph in the highly-modified RB51 Red Baron at Tonopah, Nevada, making Hinton, age 27, the youngest person ever to capture the speed record.

On September 16, 1979, Hinton was racing the RB-51 in Reno when the plane suffered catastrophic engine failure. Hinton finished the race in second place, but crashed short of the runway. Although the plane's fuel erupted in a fireball, the cockpit was thrown away from the fire and Hinton survived with a broken back, leg, and ankle.

By 1983, Hinton had established his own aircraft restoration shop, called Fighter Rebuilders.

Hinton became the chief test pilot for the Tsunami Racer in 1987.

Some of Hinton's notable wins in air racing include:

- 1978, Mojave, Red Baron
- 1978, Reno (Unlimited National Champion), Red Baron
- 1979, Miami, Red Baron
- 1979, Mojave, Red Baron
- 1985, Reno (Unlimited National Champion), Super Corsair
- 1990, Sherman, Texas, Tsunami

Hinton retired from racing in 1990 to become a stunt aviator, demonstration pilot and aircraft restorer. Steve has restored and rebuilt more than 40 vintage aircraft, and since 1994 has been the President of Planes of Fame Air Museum in Chino, California.

== Film and demonstration aviation ==
Hinton is a member of the Screen Actors Guild and charter member of the Motion Picture Pilots Association. He has worked on more than 60 films.

In 2002, he received a nomination from the World Stunt Awards for the Taurus Award, Best Aerial Work in Pearl Harbor. In 2018, he was part of the team which won the Taurus Stunt Award for Best Specialty Stunt for work on Dunkirk. The award was shared with Dan Friedkin, Craig Hosking, John Romain and Ed Shipley.

As a demonstration and heritage flight pilot, Hinton participated in a five plane formation flyover at Super Bowl LVI in Los Angeles to commemorate the 75th anniversary of the United States Air Force. Hinton piloted “Wee Willy II”, his rebuilt P-51 Mustang formerly known as Red Baron.

== Personal life ==
In 1980, Hinton married Karen Maloney. Karen is the daughter of Steve's friend, American aviation legendary historian Ed Maloney. Steven's son, Steven Hinton Jr., is also an aviator and air racer. Steven Hinton Jr. became the youngest pilot to win Unlimited Gold at Reno at age 22 in 2009. Steven Hinton Jrs. twin sister, Amanda Hinton, is an accomplished United States Airforce veteran and emergency physician.

== See also ==
- Fastest propeller-driven aircraft
