= Miss Ashley II =

Custom racing aircraft

P-51R Miss Ashley II
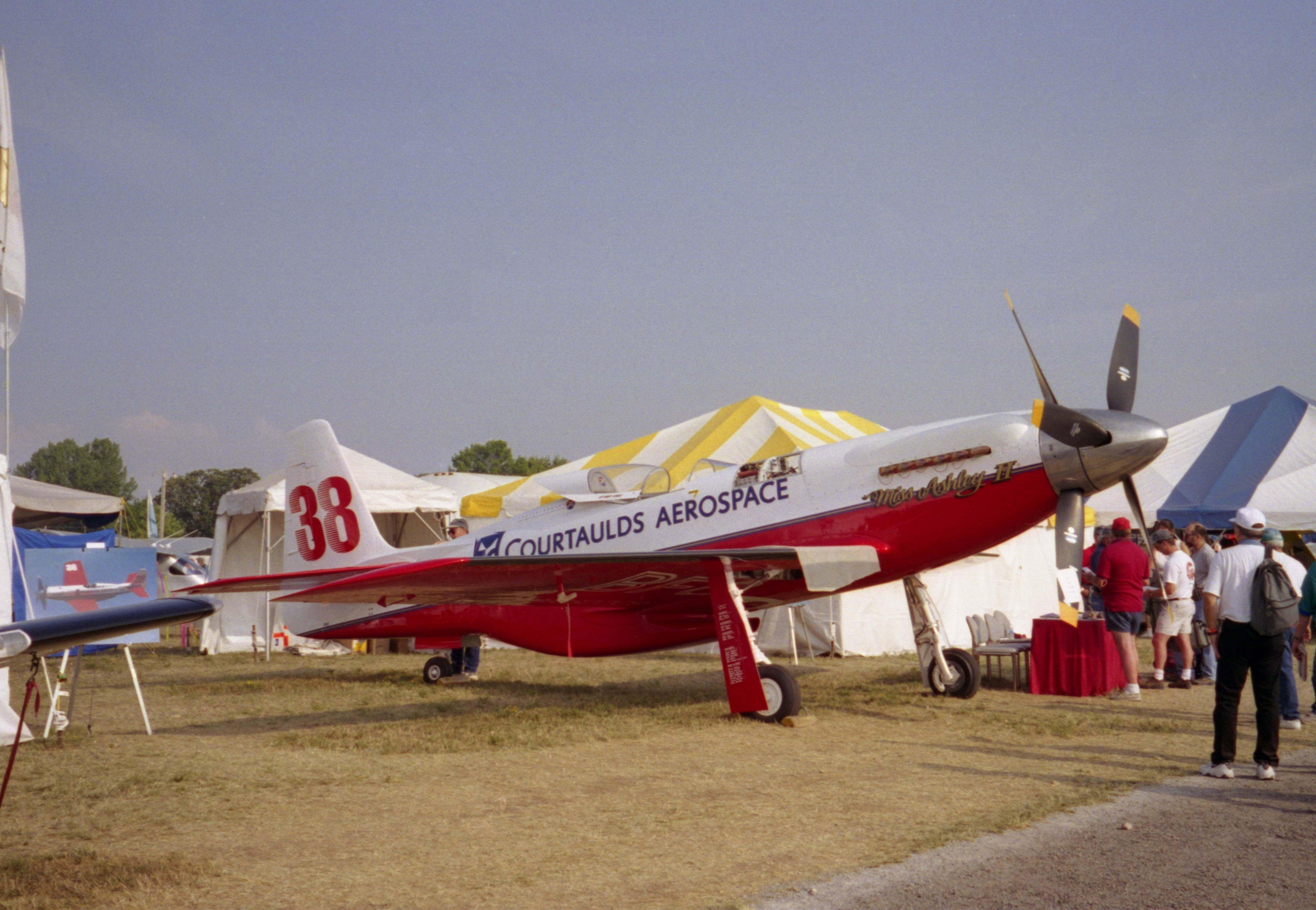
- Miss Ashley II in July 1998

General information
- Other name: Race 38
- Type: Racing aircraft
- National origin: United States
- Manufacturer: Rogers
- Designer: Bill L. Rogers
- Owners: Bill L. Rogers; Gary Levitz
- Number built: 1
- Construction number: 87-1002
- Registration: N57LR
- Total hours: 113

History
- Manufactured: 1996
- Introduction date: 1997
- First flight: Spring 1997
- Developed from: North American P-51 Mustang
- Fate: Destroyed during the 1999 Reno Air Races

Miss Ashley II (sometimes referred to as Rogers P-51R because of its builder and type) was a custom-built racing aircraft based on the North American P-51 Mustang.

== Design and development ==
Built by Bill L. Rogers in 1996, Miss Ashley II was a P-51R; a hybrid aircraft consisting of the fuselage of a P-51D fuselage and a P-51H vertical stabilizer, a Learjet 23 wing (without wingtip tanks) and horizontal stabilizer, and Piper Aerostar landing gear. Power was provided by a 2,455 hp Rolls-Royce Griffon 58 driving two 3-bladed contra-rotating propellers from an Avro Shackleton.

== History ==
Miss Ashley II made its first flight in the spring of 1997. The aircraft made its racing debut at the Reno Air Races later that year, piloted by Gary Levitz. The aircraft carried the race number 38, which was also used by Levitz's original P-51D Miss Ashley and Don Whittington's Griffon-powered P-51XR Mustang, Precious Metal.

=== 1999 Reno Air Races crash ===
On September 18, 1999, Miss Ashley II participated in the Unlimited Gold class of the Reno Air Races with Levitz as the pilot. On the first lap of heat 3A, Miss Ashley II was in fifth place coming around pylon 1 when the aircraft's empennage control surfaces apparently separated from the aircraft. The nose of the aircraft pitched down and the left wing separated from the fuselage before the aircraft impacted the ground, killing Levitz and completely destroying the aircraft. The wreckage struck two houses and a travel trailer, though there were no ground casualties.

The National Transportation Safety Board investigated the accident. A spectator's video reviewed by the NTSB seemed to show that the rudder and vertical stabilizer had separated from the aircraft before the crash, as they were not visible in the video. However, a video technician noted that this may have been the result of "video smearing", as the video's frame rate may have been too low to accurately capture the rapidly-moving aircraft. Reconstruction of the empennage wreckage was also inconclusive. The final NTSB report determined that the probable cause of the accident was flutter causing the empennage and rudder to separate from the aircraft, though the cause of the flutter was not determined.

Miss Ashley II's registration, N57LR, was canceled on August 8, 2002.

== See also ==
Related development

- North American P-51 Mustang

Aircraft of comparable role, configuration, and era

- Dago Red
- Precious Metal
- Rare Bear
- Red Baron
- September Fury
- The Galloping Ghost
- Tsunami
- Voodoo
