= Red Baron (aircraft) =

Heavily modified racing aircraft

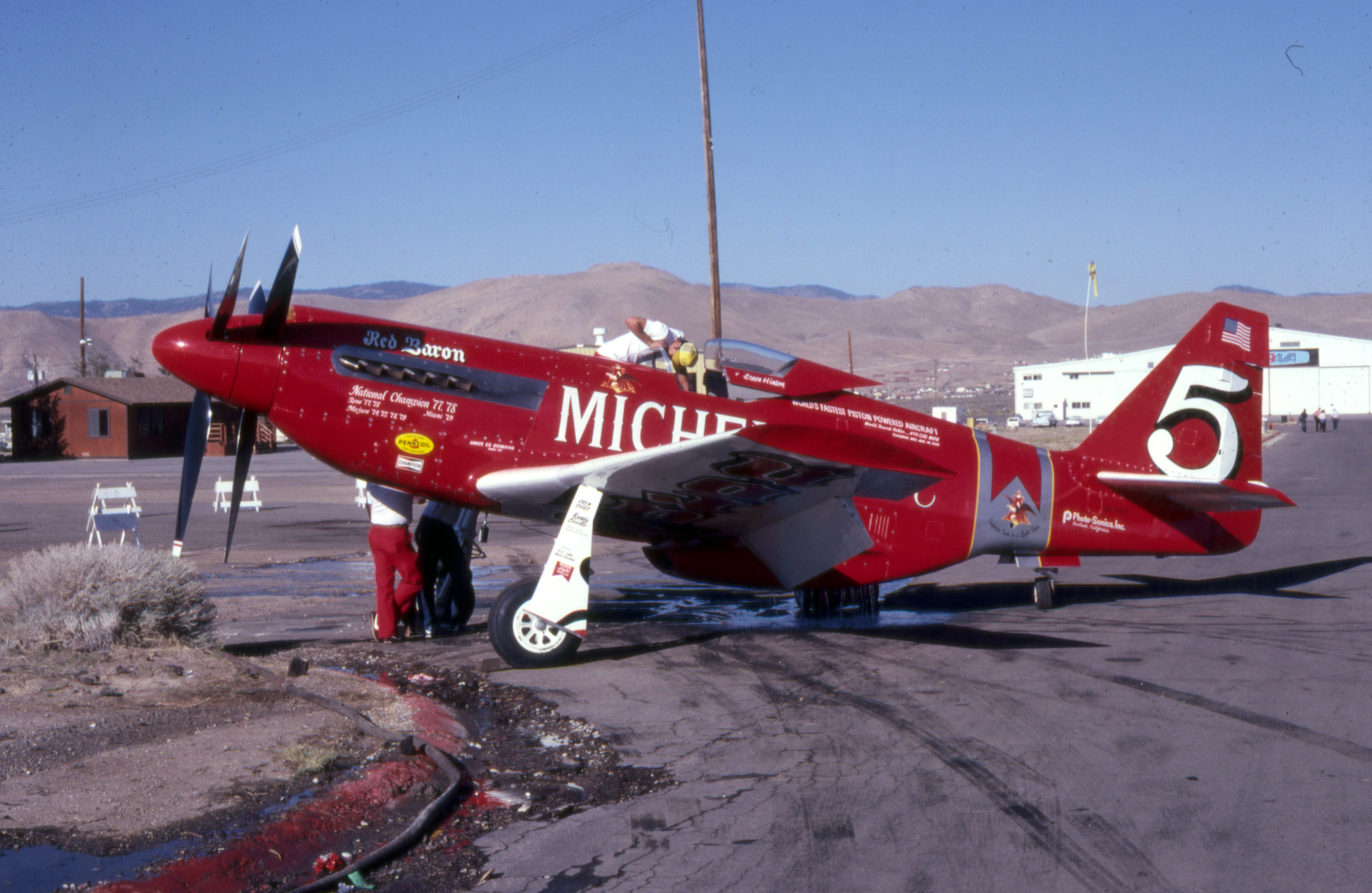
- RB-51 in Reno Pits

General information
- Type: P-51D-25-NT Mustang
- Manufacturer: North American Aviation
- Registration: NX7715C
- Serial: 44-84961

History
- Fate: Destroyed during flight accident

The Red Baron was a North American P-51D Mustang NX7715C, original serial number 44-84961. It raced from 1966 to 1973 under the names Miss R.J. and Roto-Finish Special, winning gold in the Unlimited class in 1972. In February 1974, it was purchased by Ed Browning of Red Baron Flying Service in Idaho Falls, Idaho and renamed the Red Baron.

== Design and development ==
Browning hired two Lockheed engineers, Pete Law and Bruce Boland, and a team of other specialists to make major modifications to the plane, including installation of a Rolls-Royce Griffon 57 engine and contra-rotating propellers from an Avro Shackleton. The larger engine required significant changes to the airframe, particularly the engine compartment. The contra-rotating propellers also created instability that required an increase in fin area, all of which cost Browning more than $300,000.

With these changes, the aircraft became the dominant racer on the Unlimited circuit. It was initially flown by Mac McClain and Daryl Greenamyer; in 1976, Greenamyer recommended Steve Hinton pilot the plane. Hinton won four consecutive Unlimited races in one year, and remains the only pilot ever to do so.

== History ==
On August 14, 1979, Hinton set the piston-driven aircraft 3-kilometer world speed record at 499.018 mph at Tonopah, Nevada, making Hinton, age 27, the youngest person ever to capture the speed record. The team was hoping for 100+ degree temperatures in the Nevada desert, conditions under which they believed they could achieve 530 mph. The weather did not cooperate, however, and the cool 68-degree air held their speed just under 500 mph. Even so, the record held for a decade.

On September 16, 1979, Hinton was racing the RB-51 in the Reno Air Races when a capacitor in the magneto failed, causing the engine to run on half its spark plugs. Not knowing what was wrong, Hinton pushed the plane to full throttle. This resulted in the supercharger carrying the extra pressure. Eventually, a bearing in the supercharger failed. Hinton finished the race in second place and moved to make an emergency landing. The supercharger failure resulted in a shaft failure, however; that shaft drove the oil pump, which in turn controlled the propeller pitch. The propellers went flat, acting as a huge air brake. The RB-51 crashed short of the runway. The wings were sheared off as the plane came down between two piles of rock and the fuel erupted in a fireball. The cockpit was thrown end-over-end away from the fire, yet Hinton survived with a broken back, leg, and ankle. His survival is attributed by one of the lead engineers, Pete Law, to additional braces and a roll bar installed on the cockpit.

The Red Baron was destroyed in the crash. Steve Hinton's company, Fighter Rebuilders, moved the dataplate, tailnumber 413334, and registration number NX7715C to P-51D serial number 44-73053, Wee Willy II.

== Awards ==
- 1974, First Place, Mojave
- 1976, First Place, Mojave
- 1977, First Place, Reno
- 1977, National Champion
- 1978, First Place, Mojave
- 1978, First Place, Reno
- 1978, National Champion
- 1979, First Place, Mojave
- 1979, First Place, Miami Homestead
- 1979, World Record, 3 km piston-driven aircraft

== Specifications (RB51 Red Baron) ==
General characteristics

- Crew: 1
- Powerplant: 1 × Rolls-Royce Griffon V-12 liquid-cooled piston engine, 3,000 hp (2,200 kW)
- Propellers: 6-bladed Rotol contra-rotating propeller

Performance

- Maximum speed: 430 kn (500 mph, 800 km/h) +

== See also ==
Aircraft of comparable role, configuration, and era

- Dago Red
- Miss Ashley II
- Precious Metal
- Rare Bear
- September Fury
- The Galloping Ghost
- Tsunami
- Voodoo
