= Rare Bear =

Highly modified racing aircraft

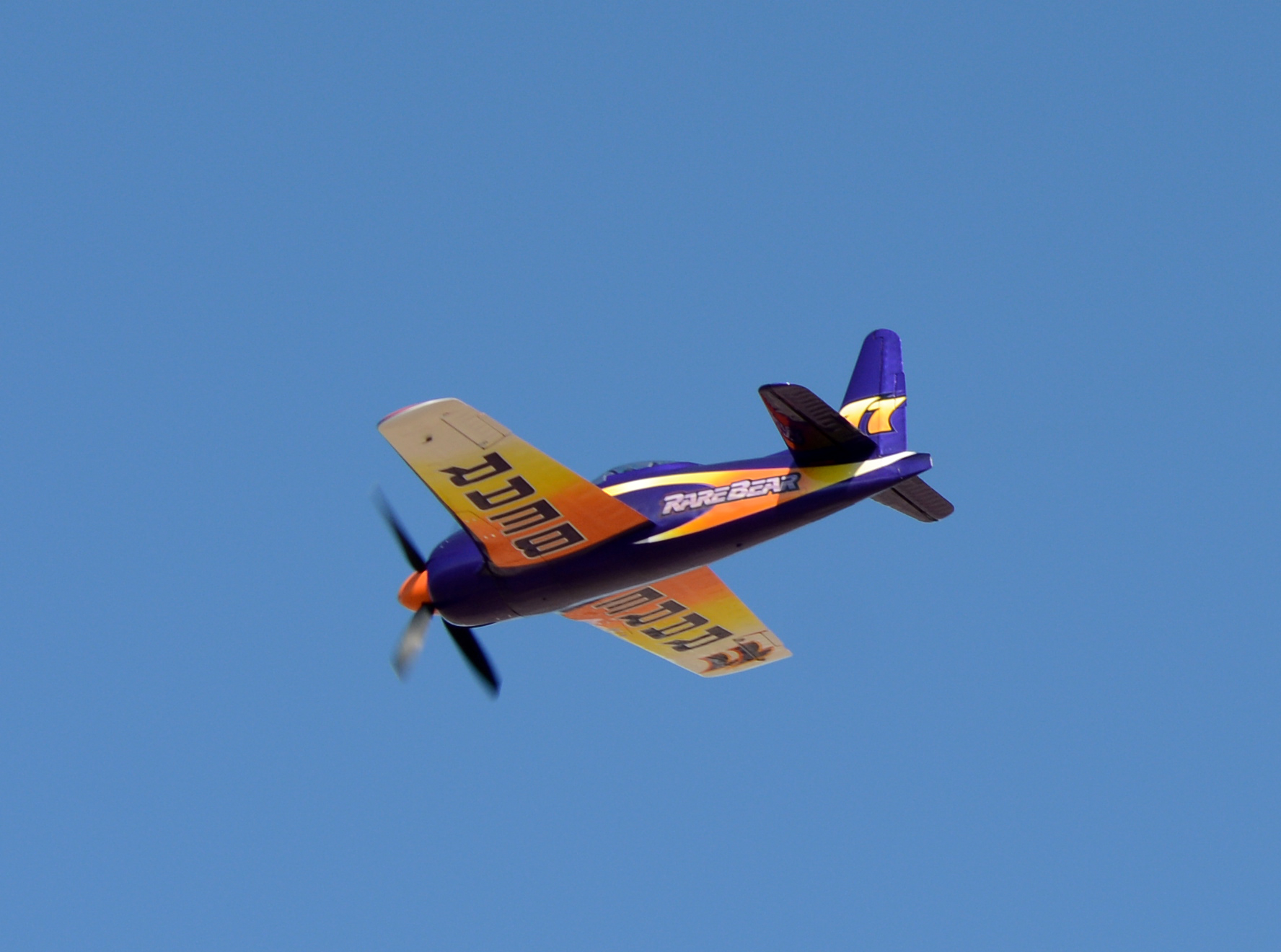
- Rare Bear during the start of the 2014 Reno Air Races Gold Final Race

General information
- Type: Grumman Bearcat
- Status: Operational
- Construction number: 122629
- Registration: N777L

History
- Manufactured: 1946
- First flight: 13 September 1969

Rare Bear is a highly modified Grumman F8F Bearcat that saw major success at the Reno Air Races over multiple decades.

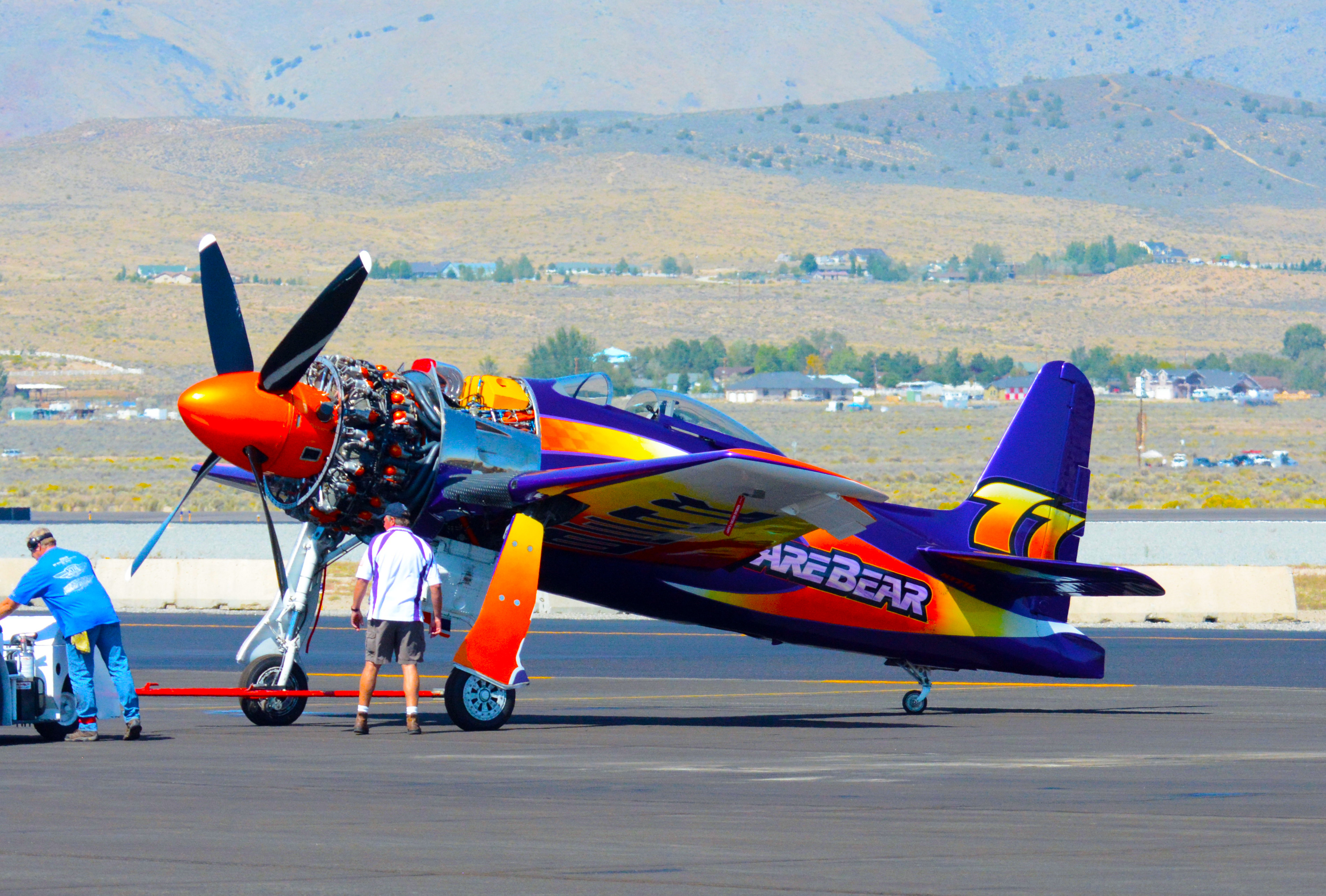
77 F8F-2 Bearcat (N-777L) Rare Bear 2014 Reno Air Races

== History ==
Rare Bear at the Reno Air Races 2014

The Bearcat that became Rare Bear was a severely damaged wreck when discovered by Lyle Shelton in 1969. It had been abandoned next to a runway on Porter County Regional Airport in Valparaiso, Indiana, after it crashed there from a throttle-on torque roll in 1962. The airplane had been stripped by parts hunters, so Shelton found a fuselage, wing center section, landing gear and a right wing panel, but little else. Shelton bought the wreck and had the pieces trucked to Orange County, California, and restoration began. One of the major modifications made during the rebuild involved installing the engine and propeller from a Douglas Skyraider - its Wright R-3350 was a more powerful engine than the Pratt & Whitney R-2800 the airframe was designed to fly. A Douglas DC-7 cowl was used, and Shelton bought the landing gear fairings and doors from the wreck of Bob Kucera's Bearcat. Bill Fornoff loaned him a left wing panel and Gunter Balz supplied a rudder. The windshield and canopy were supplied by Edward T. Maloney. The rebuild was finished with the first flight on 13 September 1969.

== Racing career ==
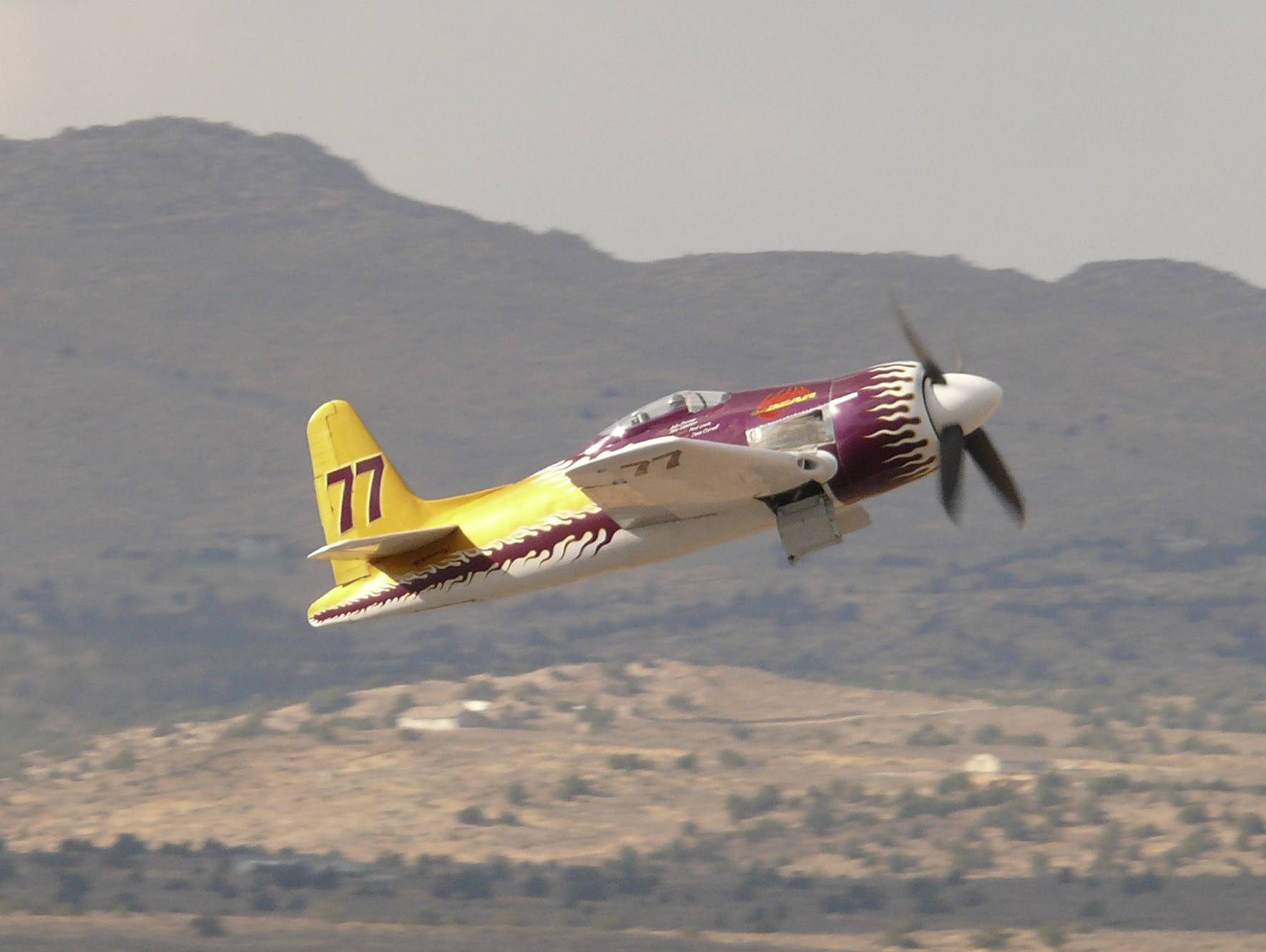
Rare Bear in 2007

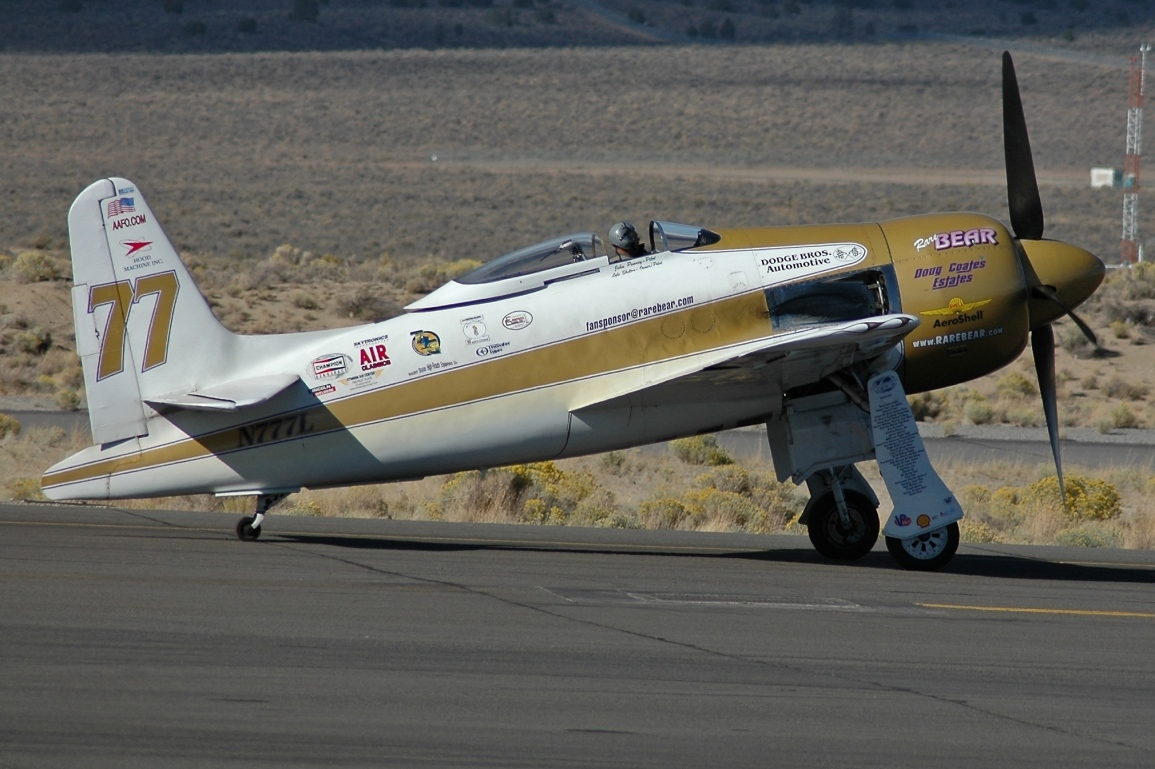
Rare Bear in 2004

Just a week after its first flight, the Bearcat appeared in its first national championship Reno Air Race, sporting the name Able Cat, where it finished a respectable 5th in the Unlimited Class, despite the lack of preparatory and flight test time. From 1969 to 1975, Lyle Shelton raced the aircraft (named Phoenix I from 1971 on) every year at the Reno Air Races, as well as air races in Mojave, California, San Diego, California, Miami, Florida and Cape May, New Jersey. In this period, he scored five victories. During the 1976 air race in Mojave California, Shelton experienced an engine failure and had to perform a belly landing.

The aircraft was not raced again until 1980, when it was renamed Rare Bear. From 1980 until present day, Rare Bear has scored eleven more victories in the Unlimited Class. A three-blade propeller, consisting of blades from a Lockheed P-3 Orion propeller, in a Lockheed Constellation hub, was fitted to the aircraft in 1988. After back-to-back testing in 2004, a switch was made back to the Skyraider's Aeroproducts-manufactured four-bladed propeller.

In late 2006 both the plane and the team were sold to Rod Lewis for just under $2 million. Recent accomplishments include finishing the Reno Air Races in 2004 and 2005 with the gold medal in the unlimited gold race. The pilot for those two championships was John Penney. In 2006 the Rare Bear was piloted by Ron Buccarelli.

For the 2007 Reno Air Races, Rare Bear appeared in a new paint scheme (burgundy fuselage, white wings, gold tail). It was piloted by John Penney, who flew it to victory in the Unlimited Class Gold Race.

In the 2008 Reno Air Races, Rare Bear appeared in yet another new paint scheme. Propeller problems during qualifying resulted in an intense all-night rebuild of the propeller. The aircraft was able to qualify and John Penney made it to the Unlimited Breitling Gold race. A landing gear problem during the qualifying heat race caused the engine to overheat. Several high-G pulls allowed the gear to extend, but the engine damage was done. The race crew said from their box in the stands that it was a matter of time before the engine let go. He was in second place when he was forced to call mayday once again during the Gold race, this time trailing smoke. While Penney made it down safely, it was then unknown how much damage had been done to Rare Bear.

Before the 2009 races, the wing root mounted oil coolers were replaced with a boil-off oil cooling system. As a result, the outer halves of both wing root inlets were closed off. Sporting yet another new paint scheme, Rare Bear finished second in the final race with a speed of 479.088 mph (770.8 km/h).

In the 2010 races, Rare Bear finished second in the Gold Heat 3A at 447.755 mph (720.6 km/h). The Gold Final race was cancelled due to weather conditions.

The aircraft has not raced since coming second in 2015, but was on static display at the 2016 and 2017 events.

== Records ==
Rare Bear has set many performance records for piston-driven aircraft, including the 3 km World Speed Record of 528.33 mph (850.26 km/h) set August 21, 1989, which still stands in this class, and a time-to-climb record (3,000 meters in 91.9 seconds set in 1972 (9842.4 ft – 6,426 fpm), breaking a 1946 record set in a stock Bearcat.

== See also ==
- Dago Red
- Miss Ashley II
- Precious Metal
- Red Baron
- September Fury
- The Galloping Ghost
- Tsunami
- Voodoo
