= Reno Stead Airport =

Airport in Reno, Nevada, United States

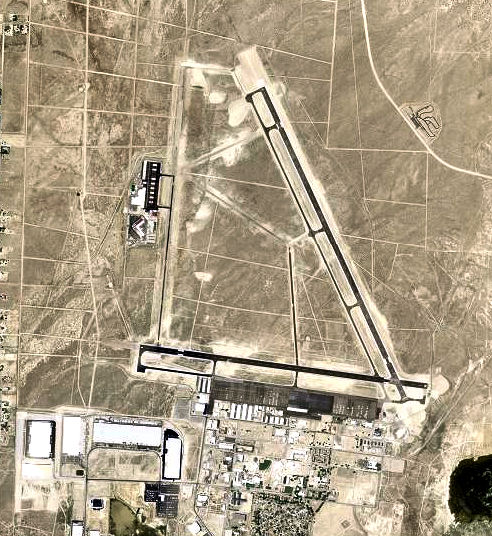
- USGS 2006 orthophoto
- IATA: none; ICAO: KRTS; FAA LID: RTS

Summary
- Airport type: Public
- Owner: Reno Tahoe Airport Authority
- Serves: Reno, Nevada
- Elevation AMSL: 5,050 ft / 1,539 m
- Coordinates: 39°40′05″N 119°52′35″W
- Website: renoairport.com/...

Map
- Location of airport in Nevada / United States KRTS/RTS (the United States)

Runways
Direction	Length		Surface
Direction	ft	m	Surface
14/32	9,000	2,743	Asphalt
08/26	7,608	2,319	Asphalt

Statistics (2020)
- Aircraft operations: 49,800
- Based aircraft: 136
- Source: Federal Aviation Administration

Reno Stead Airport (ICAO: KRTS, FAA LID: RTS, formerly 4SD) is a large public and military general aviation airport located in the North Valleys area, 10 nautical miles (19 km) northwest of the central business district of Reno, in Washoe County, Nevada, United States. A former military installation until 1966, when it was known as Stead Air Force Base, in honor of 1st Lt. Croston Stead who died there during a training exercise in 1949. The airport's sole remaining military presence consists of an Army Aviation Support Facility and the 189th General Support Aviation Battalion of the Nevada Army National Guard, flying CH-47 Chinook helicopters. The airport is owned by the Reno Tahoe Airport Authority. The National Plan of Integrated Airport Systems for 2011–2015 categorized it as a general aviation reliever airport.

Although most U.S. airports use the same three-letter location identifier for the FAA and IATA, Reno Stead Airport is assigned RTS by the FAA, but has no designation from the IATA (which assigned RTS to Rottnest Island Airport in Rottnest Island, Western Australia). Reno Stead Airport does not have regularly scheduled service, but functions as a general aviation reliever for the nearby Reno–Tahoe International Airport. The airport is used by the Bureau of Land Management as a base for fire fighting aircraft.

== History ==
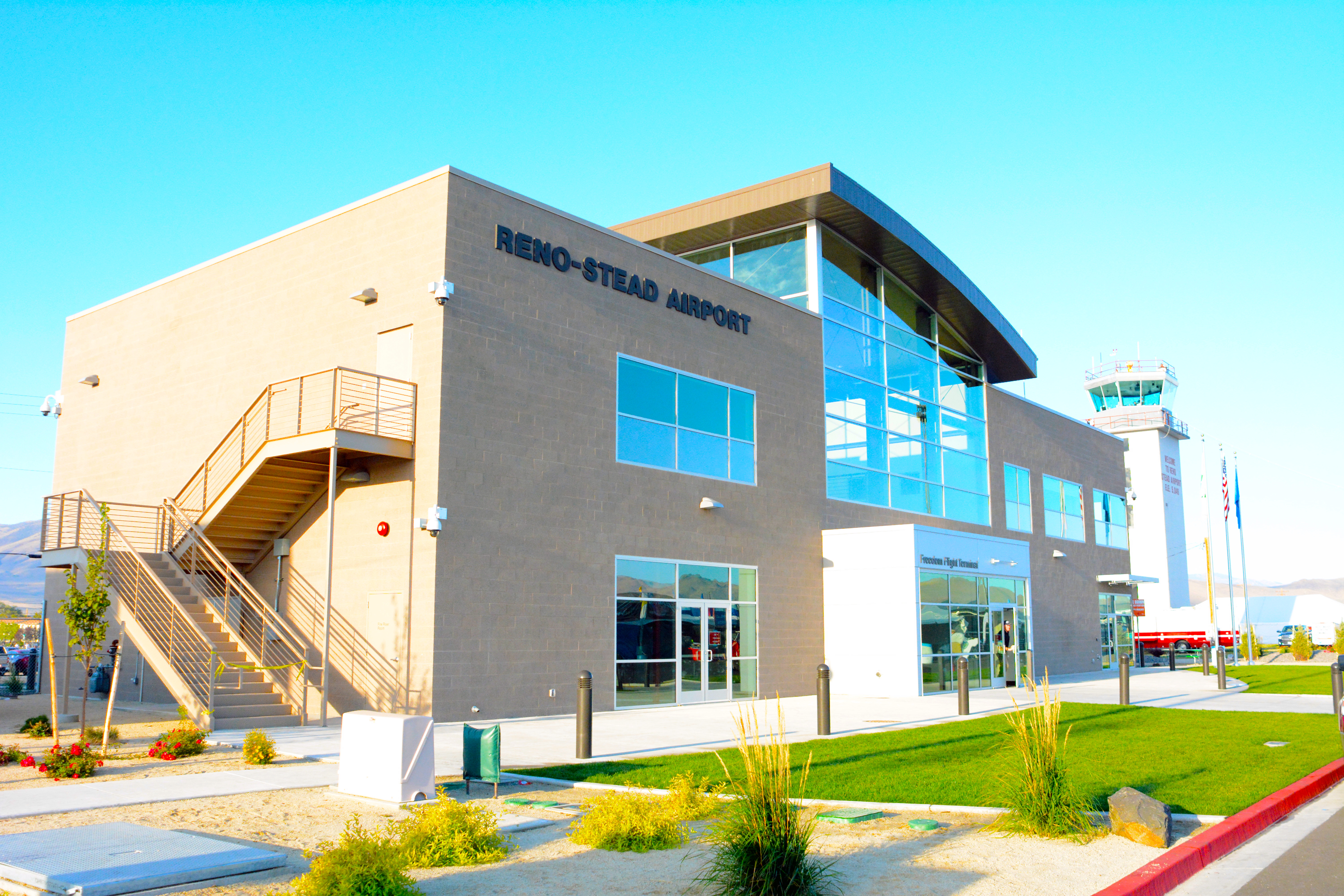
Reno Stead Airport Tower and Operations center

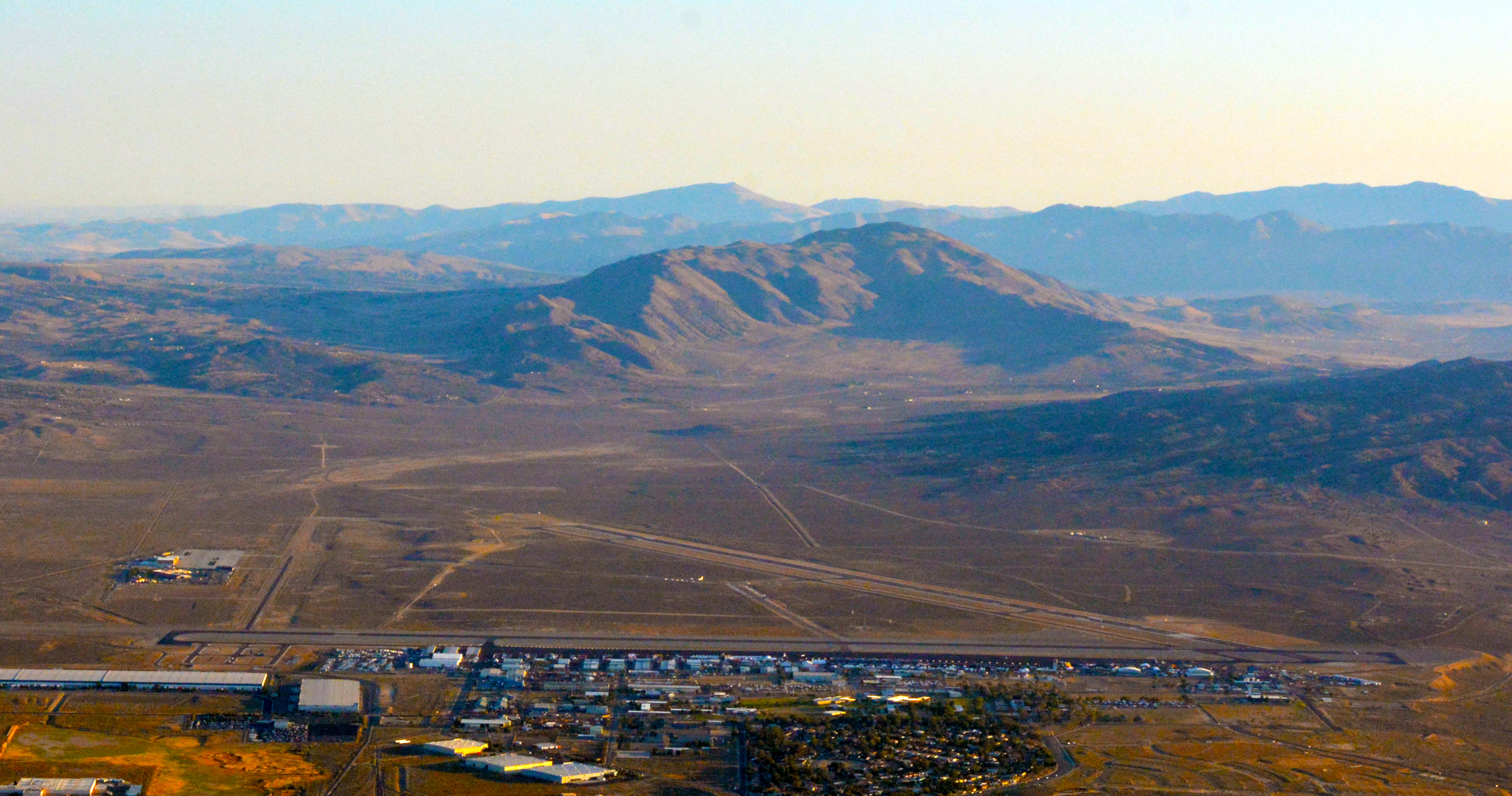
View of Reno Stead Airport

The location was opened by the United States Army Air Forces in 1942, in the middle of World War 2.

Stead Air Force Base was established by the United States Air Force (USAF) at the airfield in 1951, when it was determined that the Sierra Nevada and nearby forests would be suitable for survival training. The USAF Survival School and 3904th Composite Wing moved to the base from Camp Carson, Colorado, on 29 May 1951. Equipped with C-119 Flying Boxcars for training, SAC had begun the training for its personnel, teaching them how to survive if forced down in remote and/or unfriendly terrain, how to escape capture, and how to escape if captured.

Other commands wanted to train aircrews in survival techniques, and in September 1954 Stead AFB became part of the Air Training Command (ATC), and the 3904th Composite Wing became the 3635th Combat Crew Training Wing. After a number of name changes, the survival training school became the 3637th Combat Crew Training Squadron.

In January 1958, a small group of instructor pilots from Randolph AFB, Texas, was sent to Stead AFB to determine the feasibility of advanced helicopter training in the area's mountains. On 15 July 1958, the 3635th Crew Training Wing was redesignated as the 3635th Flying Training Wing (Advanced), concurrent with the relocation of the USAF Helicopter Pilot School to Stead.

In 1960 and 1962, astronauts were trained in desert survival by the 3637th Combat Crew Training Squadron and then helicoptered to a location near the Carson Sink for further training.

In 1964 the Reno Stead Airport was operated by the Ag Aviation Academy, which was then based in Minden, Nevada, about 15 miles south of Carson City. By 1966, the AG Aviation Academy moved totally up to Stead. In 1967 Robert E. Schricker retired from a 27-year career as a fighter pilot for the USAF and became Chief Pilot for the AG Academy. The academy taught all types of flying courses and ground schools, including helicopter and multi engine courses. Actress and race pilot, Susan Oliver, got her multi engine pilot license there in 1968. Chief Pilot Schricker left the AG Academy in 1969 to open his own flight school, Reno's Executive Air, at the main Reno Airport. In the 1960s, Bill Lear, founder of Learjet, also set up operations at the Stead Airport. Between 1964 and 2024, it was home to the National Championship Air Races, also known as the Reno Air Races, held every September. It was the launch site of "Earthwinds" balloon system in the early 1990s, which attempted and failed multiple times to circumnavigate the globe.

== Facilities and aircraft ==
Reno/Stead Airport covers an area of 5,000 acres (2,023 ha) at an elevation of 5,050 feet (1,539 m) above mean sea level. It has two runways with asphalt surfaces: 14/32 is 9,000 by 150 feet (2,743 x 46 m) and 8/26 is 7,608 by 150 feet (2,319 x 46 m).

For the 12-month period ending December 31, 2020, the airport had 49,800 aircraft operations, an average of 136 per day: 86% general aviation and 14% military. At that time there were 186 aircraft based at this airport: 136 single-engine, 16 military, 9 multi-engine, 19 jet, and 6 helicopters.

== See also ==
- Reno-Tahoe International Airport (RNO)
- List of airports in Nevada
- Reno Air Races
- 2011 Reno Air Races crash
