= Lyle Shelton (aviator) =

American aviator (1933–2010)

Lyle Thomas Shelton (1933–2010) was an American aviator who set the world's absolute propeller-driven 3-kilometer speed record of 528.329 mph.

== Early life ==
Lyle Thomas Shelton was born in Brownfield, Texas, on June 15, 1933.

== Career ==
A former US naval aviator, Shelton was an airline pilot for his professional career, flying for Trans World Airlines (TWA). During his career at TWA, he flew Boeing 707s, 727s, Douglas DC-9s and the Lockheed L-1011. He retired from TWA in 1991.

As an air race pilot, Shelton won ten Unlimited air races, more than any other pilot, and six U.S. national championships at the Reno National Championship Air Races, second only to Darryl Greenamyer. He set the world's absolute propeller-driven 3-kilometer speed record of 528.329 mph.

Shelton was inducted into the Motorsports Hall of Fame of America in 1999.

As an air race pilot, Shelton is best known for flying the highly modified Grumman F8F "Rare Bear", which he restored in 1969 and raced until his retirement from racing after the 1997 Reno National Championship Air Races.

== Death ==
Shelton died in 2010.

== Notable wins ==
- 1971 Cape May
- 1971 National point champion for Unlimited
- 1973 Miami
- 1973 Reno (Unlimited national champion)
- 1973 National point champion for Unlimited
- 1975 Reno (Unlimited national champion)
- 1975 National point champion for Unlimited
- 1976 Mojave
- 1988 Hamilton
- 1988 Reno (Unlimited national champion)
- 1988 National point champion for Unlimited
- 1989 Reno (Unlimited national champion)
- 1989 National point champion for Unlimited
- 1990 Reno (Unlimited national champion)
- 1990 National point champion for Unlimited
- 1991 Reno (Unlimited national champion)
- 1991 National point champion for Unlimited

== Notable speed records ==
- 1972 "Time to Climb" (standing start to 10,000 feet), 91.9 seconds (still stands as of July 2011)
- 1973 Reno qualifying speed record, 426.602 mph
- 1973 Reno Unlimited Gold race speed record, 428.155 mph
- 1974 Reno qualifying speed record, 432.252 mph
- 1975 Reno Unlimited Gold race speed record, 429.916 mph
- 1988 Reno qualifying speed record, 474.622 mph
- 1988 Reno Unlimited Gold race speed record, 456.821 mph
- 1989 world's absolute propeller-driven 3k speed record, Las Vegas, 528.329 mph (still stands as of July 2011)
- 1990 Reno Unlimited Gold race speed record, 468.620 mph
- 1991 Reno qualifying speed record, 475.899 mph
- 1991 Reno Unlimited Gold race speed record, 481.618 mph
- 1992 Reno qualifying speed record, 482.892 mph

== See also ==
- Fastest propeller-driven aircraft
