= Osprey (disambiguation) =

An osprey is a medium-large fish-eating bird of prey.

Osprey(s) may also refer to:

== Astronomy ==
- Osprey, one of four formally named regions on the asteroid 101955 Bennu, as mapped by the OSIRIS-REx spacecraft

== Businesses ==
- Osprey Media, a Canadian publishing group of daily and weekly newspapers and specialty publications
- Osprey Packs, an American outdoor backpack brand
- Osprey Publishing, a British publishing company that specializes in books on military history and military equipment
- Sandvik Osprey, a British metallurgical company

== Geography ==
- Osprey, Florida, a town in the United States

== Military ==
- Operation Osprey, an unimplemented German plan in World War II
- Bell–Boeing V-22 Osprey, a tiltrotor aircraft in use by the US armed forces

== Sports ==
- Ospreys (rugby union), a Welsh rugby union team that plays its home matches in Swansea, Wales
- Missoula Osprey, a minor league baseball team in Missoula, Montana
- North Florida Ospreys, the athletic teams of the University of North Florida

== Technology ==
- Osprey body armour, a body armour system used by the British military
- Osprey process, a spray forming process owned by Sandvik Osprey

== Transportation ==
=== Aircraft ===
(Chronological)

- Hawker Osprey (from 1932), the navalised carrier-borne version of the Hawker Hart biplane
- Fairchild SD-5 Osprey, (from 1960) American reconnaissance drone
- Osprey Osprey I (from 1970), Sport flying boat
- Osprey Osprey 2 (from 1973), Sport amphibian
- Monaghan Osprey (from 1973), glider
- Osprey GP-4 (from 1984), a low-wing retractable gear aircraft of wood construction
- Osprey GP-5 (late 1980's), a racing airplane designed by George Pereira
- Paraplane PSE-2 Osprey (from 1990s), an American powered parachute design
- Bell Boeing V-22 Osprey (from 1989), tiltrotor aircraft manufactured by Bell Helicopter Textron and Boeing

=== Locomotives ===
- LNER Class A4 4488 Union of South Africa steam locomotive, briefly renamed "Osprey" during a period in the 1980s and early 1990s
- Osprey, the name carried by LNER Peppercorn Class A1 locomotive 60131 from its entry into service in October 1948 until its withdrawal in October 1965

=== Ships ===
- HMS Osprey, five ships and a shore establishment of the British Royal Navy
- USFS Osprey, a U.S. Bureau of Fisheries fishery patrol vessel in commission from 1913 to 1921
- USS Osprey, several ships of the United States Navy
- USS Osprey II (SP-928), a United States Navy patrol boat in commission from 1917 to 1918
- Osprey class coastal minehunter, a class of United States Navy minehunting vessels

== Music ==
- Osprey V Gaza's first rock band

== Video games ==
- Osprey, a cruiser class ship from the MMORPG Eve Online
- Osprey Gunner, a kill streak from the FPS Call of Duty: Modern Warfare 3
