= Catbird (disambiguation) =

A catbird is any one of several unrelated songbirds with cat-like calls.

Catbird may also refer to:

== Aircraft ==
- Lockheed Martin CATBird, Lockheed Martin test aircraft
- Scaled Composites Catbird, a high-efficiency five-seat single-engine aircraft

== Basketball ==
- Louisville Catbirds, a basketball team
- La Crosse Catbirds, a basketball team

== Other ==
- Catbird (jeweler), an American jeweler
- Catbird, an Australian thoroughbred horse that won the Golden Slipper Stakes in 1999
- Catbird Records, a US independent record label
- Catbird seat, an idiomatic phrase used to describe an enviable position
- Cat Bird, a 2017 platformer mobile game
