= Osprey GP-4 =

American homebuilt aircraft

GP-4
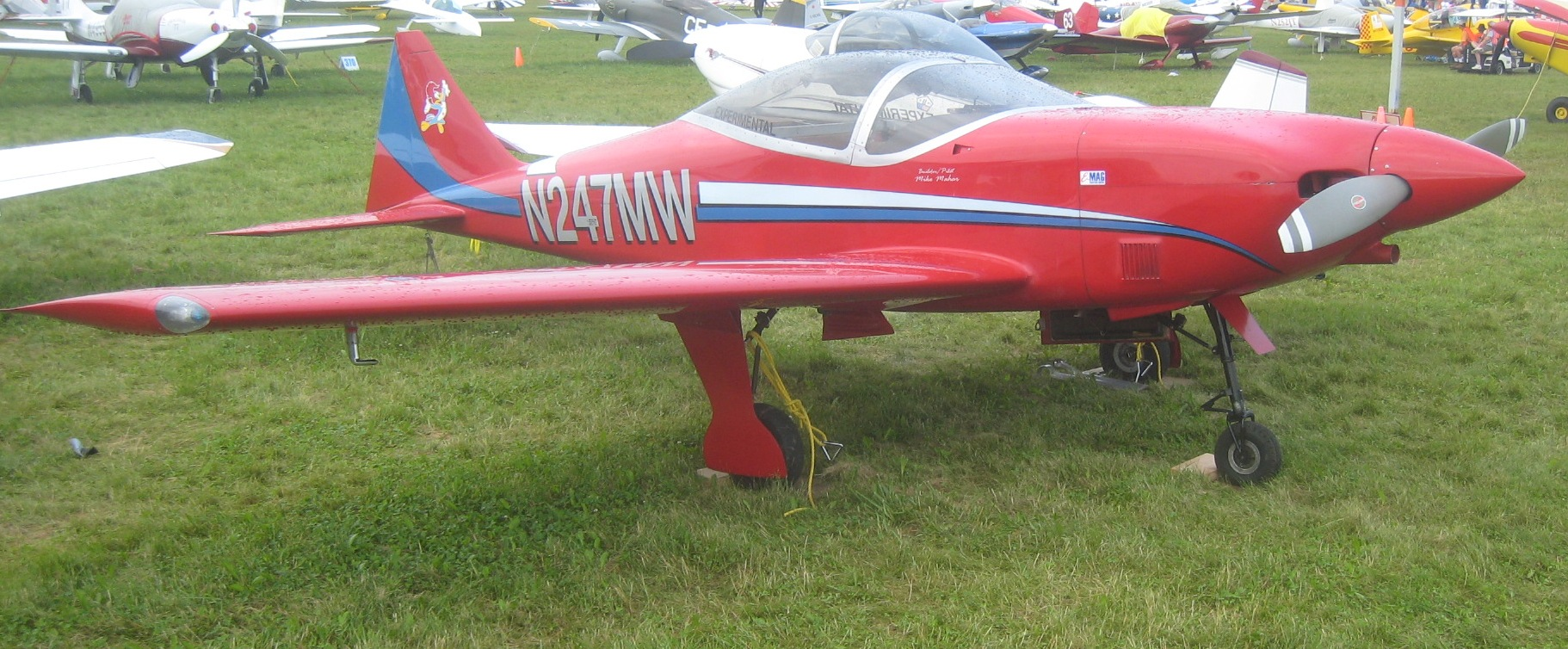
- GP-4

General information
- Type: Experimental Aircraft
- National origin: United States
- Manufacturer: Osprey Aircraft
- Designer: George Pereira
- Status: Plans available (2015)

History
- Introduction date: 1984
- First flight: 1984

The GP-4 is an experimental aircraft designed to fly cross country with two passengers 1,100 mi (1,770 km) at 240 mph (386 km/h). Aircraft Spruce & Specialty Co has the rights to distribute the kits for the aircraft, while the plans are distributed by Osprey Aircraft.

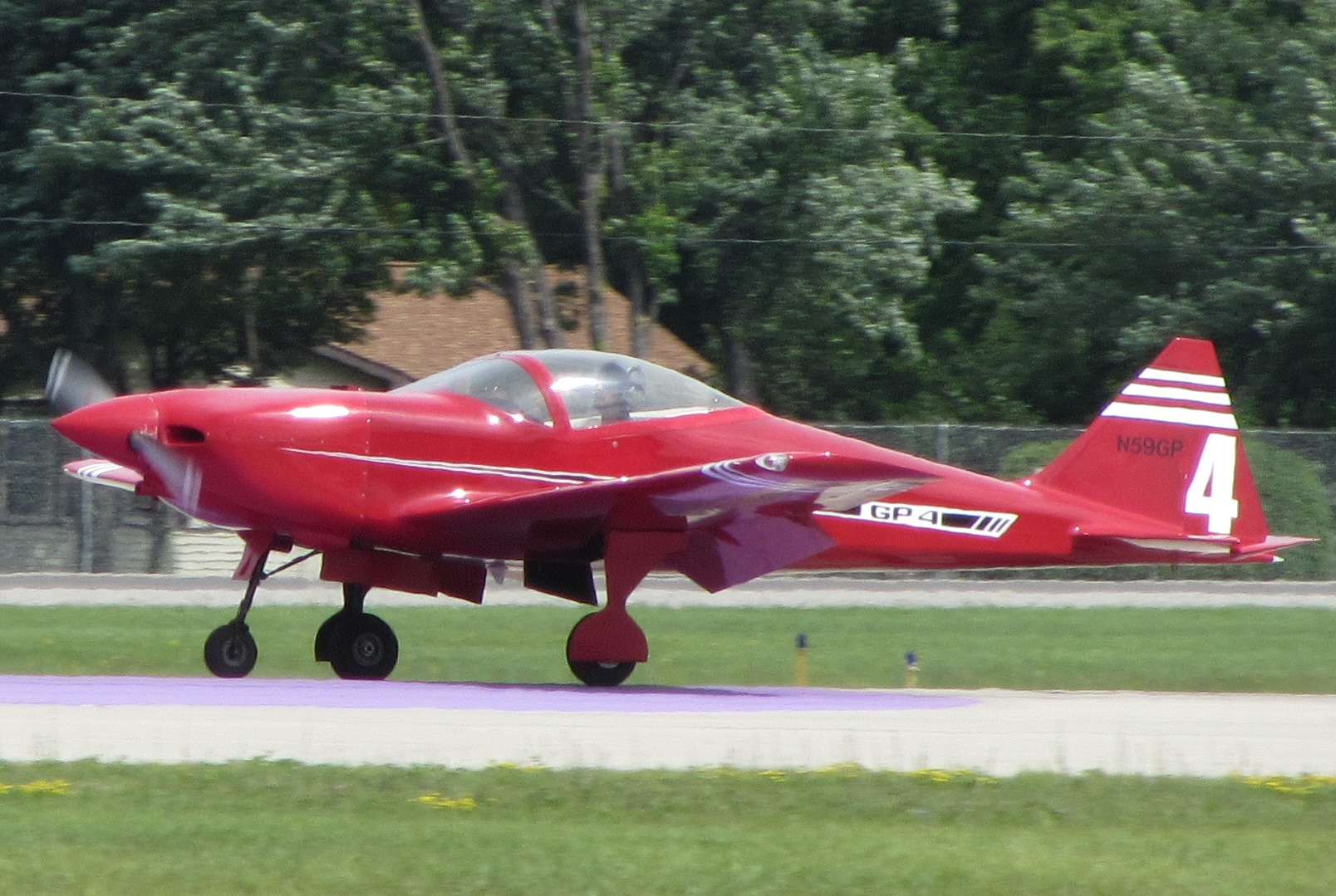
Osprey Aircraft GP-4

== Design and development ==
The GP-4 is the fourth aircraft from designer George Pereira, It is a low wing side-by-side retractable gear aircraft of wood construction. It has a single spar stressed to +8 to -6G loading.

The aircraft's wooden construction is labor-intensive and an estimated 3000–4000 hours are required to construct it.

== Operational history ==
In 1984, the GP-4 won the Grand Champion Custom Built and the Outstanding New Design awards at the Experimental Aircraft Association Airventure airshow in Oshkosh, Wisconsin.

== Specifications GP-4 ==
Data from Osprey

General characteristics

- Crew: one
- Capacity: one passenger
- Length: 21 ft 6 in (6.55 m)
- Wingspan: 24 ft (7.3 m)
- Wing area: 104 sq ft (9.7 m^{2})
- Airfoil: Laminar 63 Series
- Empty weight: 1,260 lb (572 kg)
- Gross weight: 2,000 lb (907 kg)
- Fuel capacity: 54 U.S. gallons (200 L; 45 imp gal)
- Powerplant: 1 × Lycoming IO-360-A1A

Performance

- Never exceed speed: 222 kn (255 mph, 410 km/h)
- Range: 960 nmi (1,100 mi, 1,800 km) 75% Power 240mph
- Service ceiling: 20,000 ft (6,100 m)
- Rate of climb: 2,200 ft/min (11 m/s)

== See also ==
Related development

- Osprey Aircraft Osprey I
- Osprey Aircraft Osprey II
- Osprey GP-5
