= Larkin Skylark =

Skylark KC-3

General information
- Type: Homebuilt semi-amphibious aircraft
- National origin: United States
- Manufacturer: Larkin Aircraft Corporation
- Number built: 1

History
- First flight: 1973

The Larkin Skylark is single-engine amphibious homebuilt aircraft. Only one aircraft was built and flown in 1973.

== Design ==
The Skylark is a pusher-style design with a single Volkswagen air-cooled engine above and behind the fully enclosed cockpit. The cockpit seats two occupants in side-by-side configuration, with a large Plexiglas canopy curving around both occupants. The tail is a twin-boom arrangement attached at the trailing edge of the wings, allowing clearance for the pusher propeller above and within the booms. The landing gear is a tricycle arrangement with the nose gear positioned at the foremost point of the nose and the two main gear semi-recessed into teardrop-shaped fairings on the lower sides. The fuselage and landing gear are internally supported with an aluminum tube keel.

The Skylark is capable of amphibious operation when fitted with an optional V-shaped lower hull made out of fiberglass.

== Specifications ==
Data from Plane & Pilot

General characteristics

- Crew: 2 (pilot and passenger)
- Length: 19 ft 6 in (5.95 m)
- Wingspan: 26 ft 6 in (8.08 m)
- Empty weight: 790 lb (358 kg)
- Gross weight: 1,246 lb (565 kg)
- Powerplant: 1 × Volkswagen automotive engine , 65 hp (48 kW)

Performance

- Maximum speed: 115 mph (185 km/h, 100 kn)
- Range: 525 mi (845 km, 456 nmi)
- Service ceiling: 12,000 ft (3,659 m)
- Rate of climb: 550 ft/min (2.8 m/s)

== See also ==
Aircraft of comparable role, configuration, and era

- Osprey Osprey 2
- Spencer Air Car
- Taylor Coot
- Volmer VJ-22 Sportsman

Related lists

- List of flying boats and floatplanes
