= Mojave Air and Space Port =

Facility located in Mojave, California

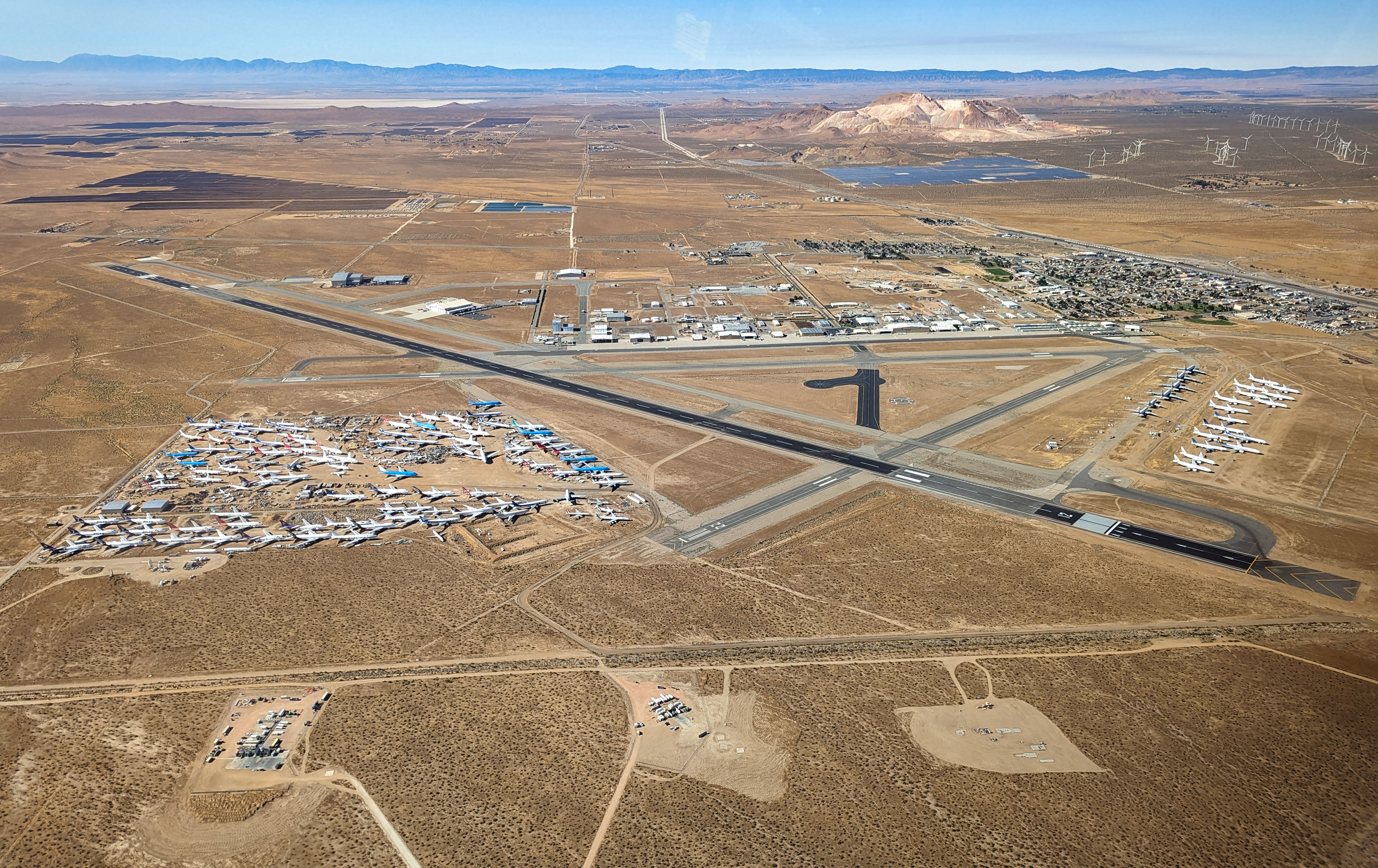
- Mojave in 2023
- IATA: MHV; ICAO: KMHV

Summary
- Airport type: Public
- Owner: Airport District
- Operator: East Kern Airport District, Mojave, California
- Location: Mojave, California
- Elevation AMSL: 2,801 ft (854 m)
- Coordinates: 35°03′34″N 118°09′06″W
- Website: www.mojaveairport.com

Map
- Location within southern California Location within California Location within the United States

Runways
| Direction | Length | | Surface |
| Direction | ft | m | Surface |
|---|---|---|---|
| 12/30 | 12,503 | 3,811 | Asphalt/concrete |
| 08/26 | 7,049 | 2,149 | Asphalt |
| 04/22 | 4,746 | 1,447 | Asphalt |
- Source: Federal Aviation Administration

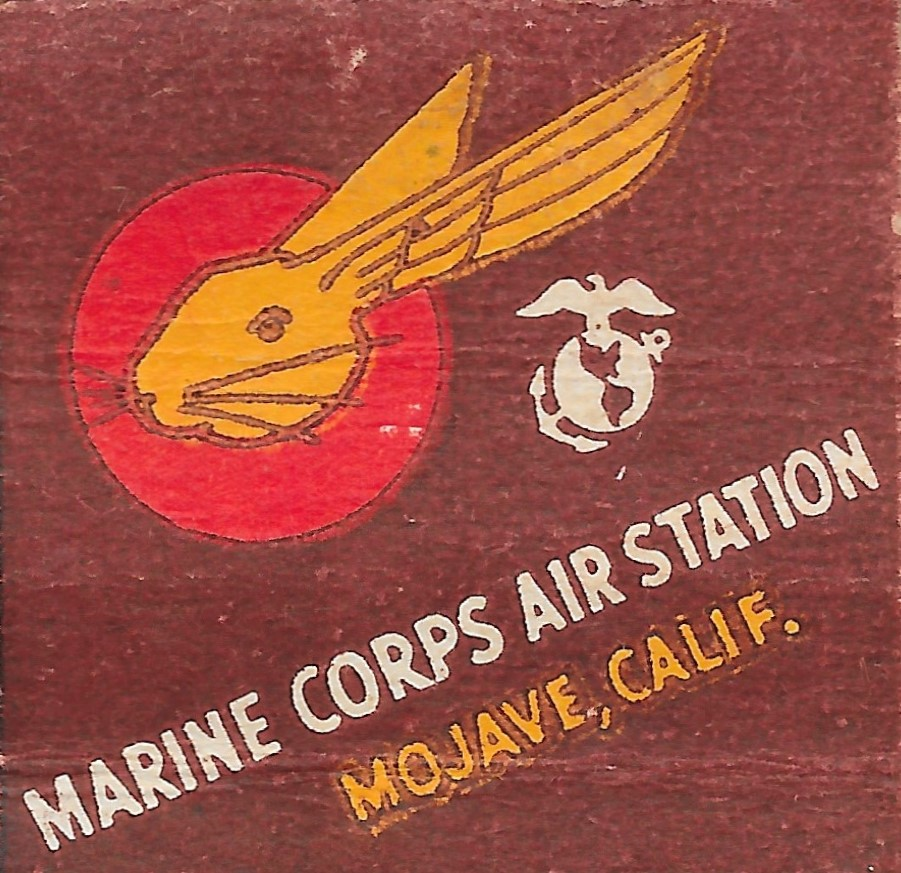
MCAS Mojave insignia on a matchbook cover

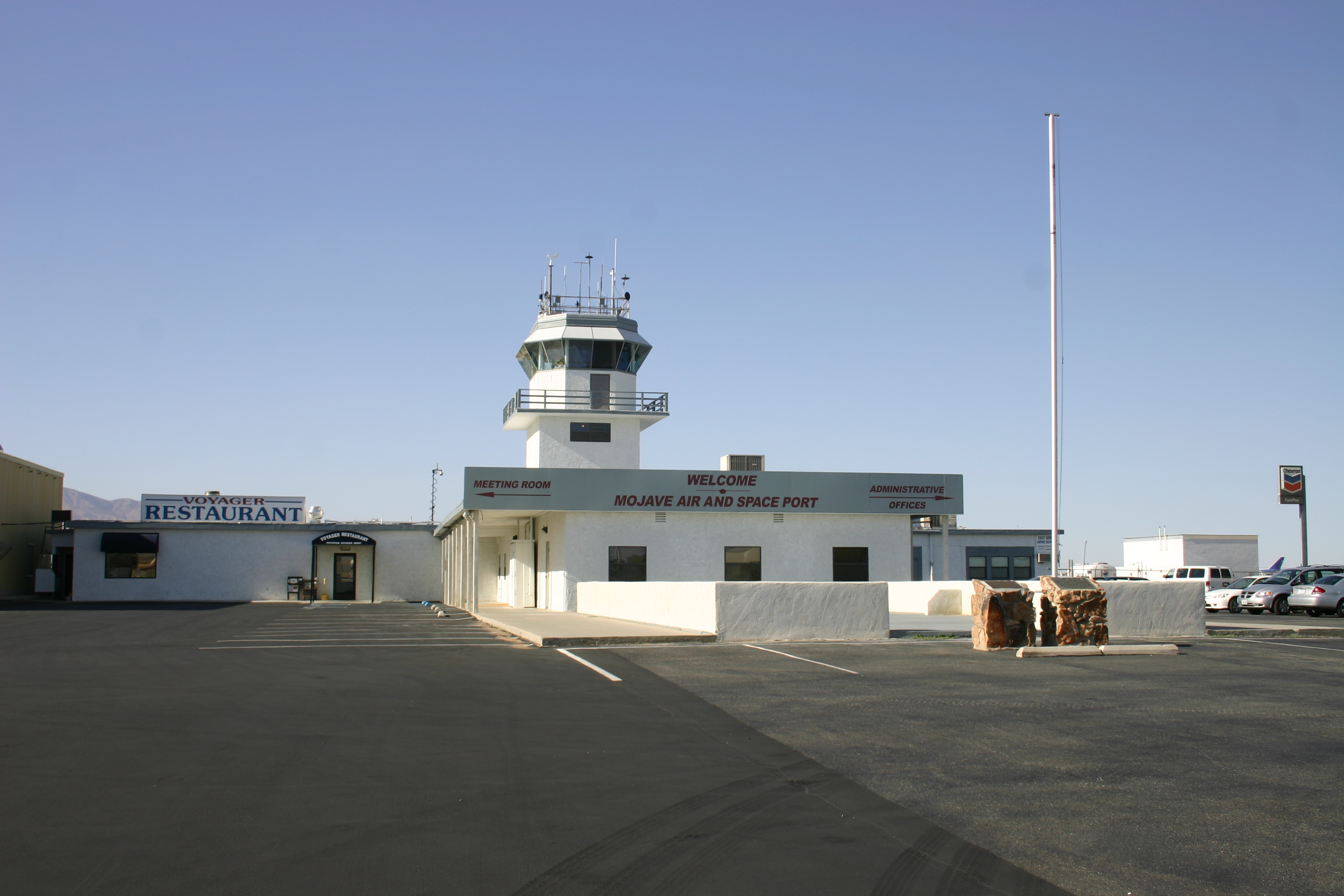
Administration offices, restaurant and old tower

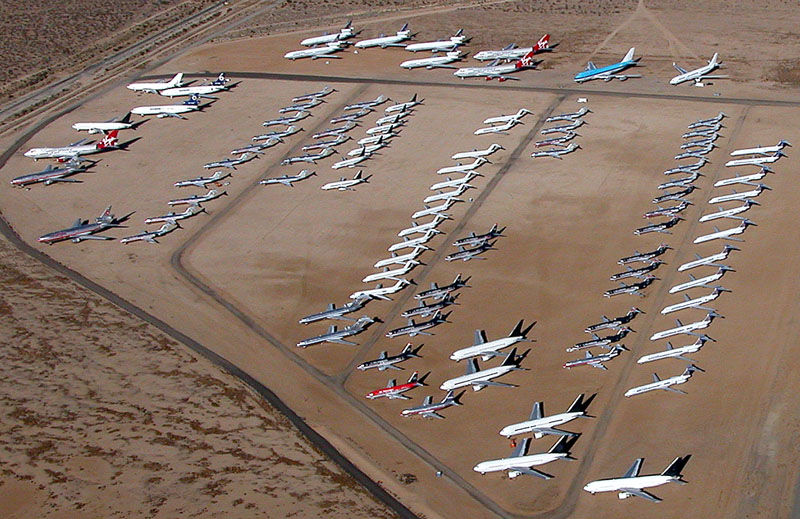
Mojave Airport, storage location for commercial airliners

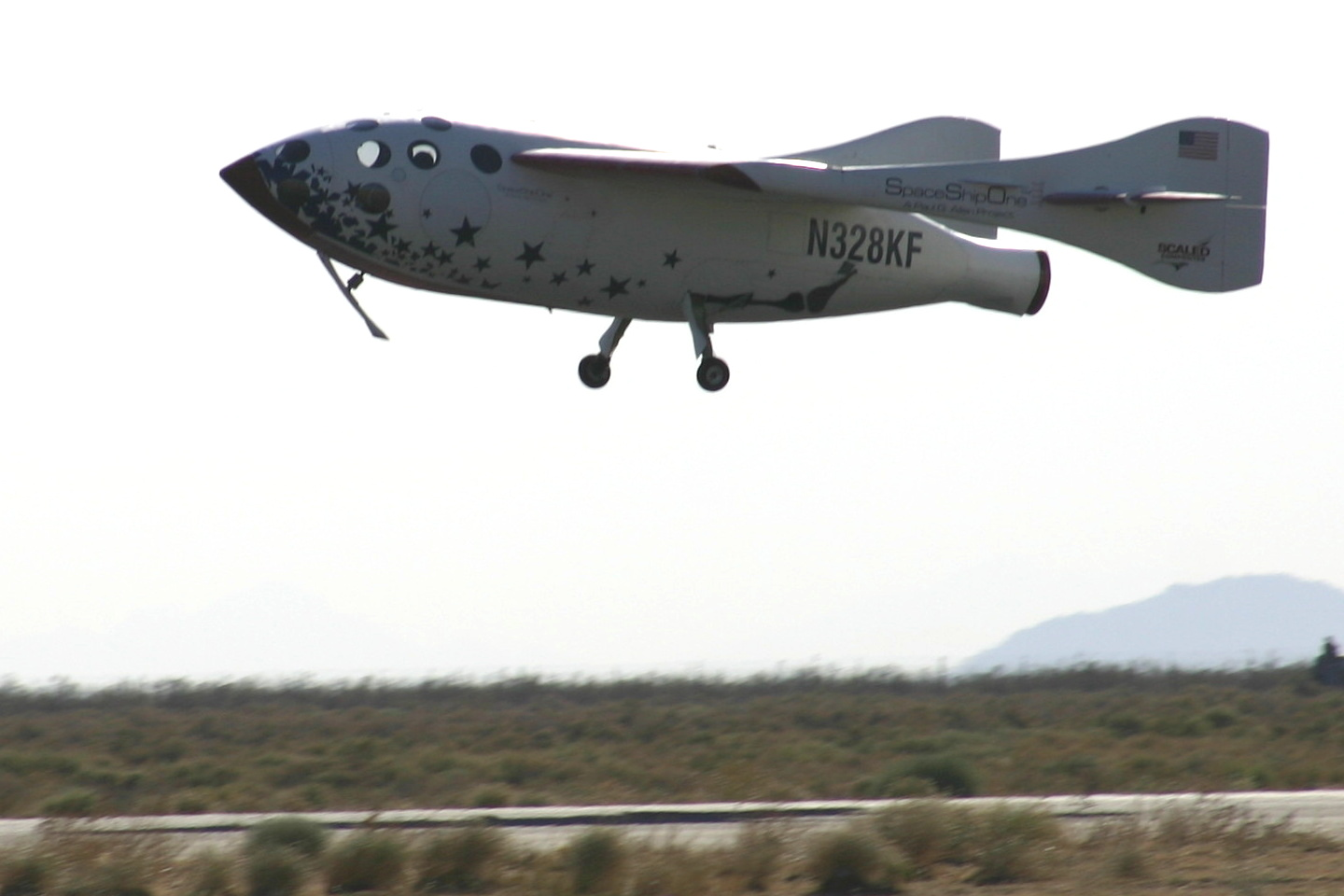
SpaceShipOne landing at Mojave after June 21, 2004, space flight

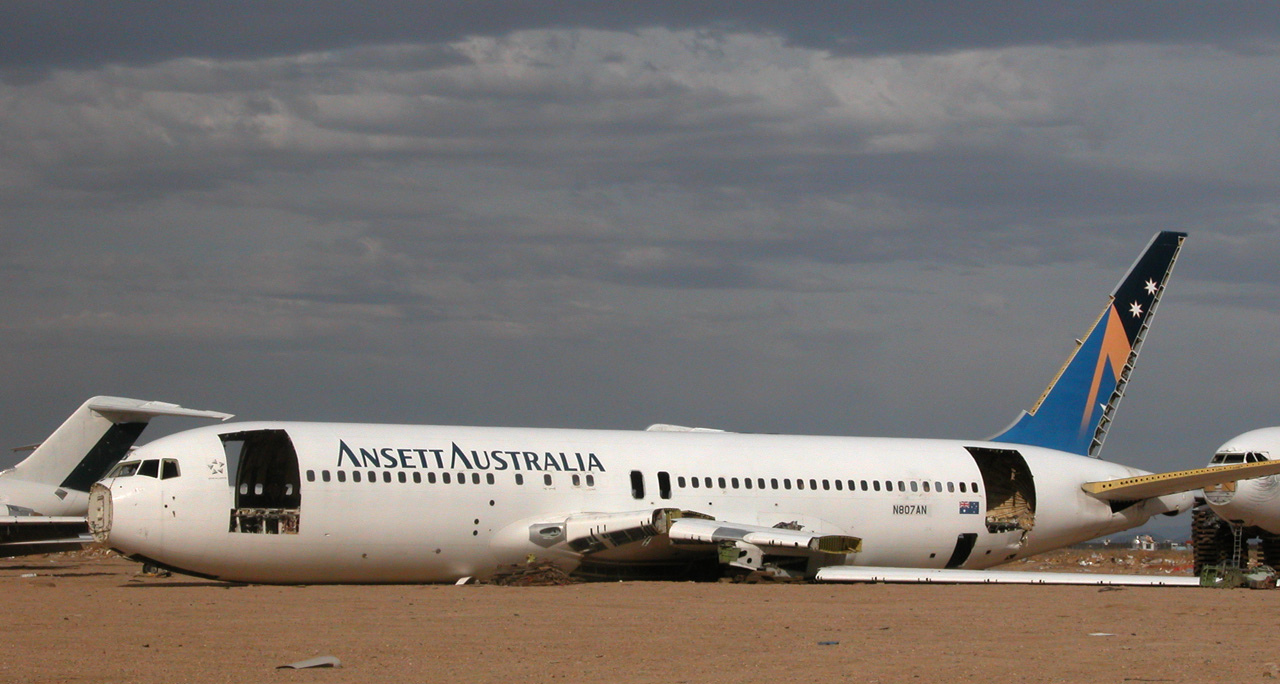
A retired Boeing 767-200 that flew for Ansett Australia being cut open for scrap at Mojave Airport

The Mojave Air and Space Port (IATA: MHV, ICAO: KMHV) is a general-use public airport with three main areas of activity: flight testing, space industry development, and aircraft heavy maintenance and storage. Located in Mojave, California, United States, at an elevation of 2,801 feet (854 m), the three runway facility covers 2,998 acres (1,213 ha). It is also the first facility licensed in the U.S. for horizontal launches of reusable spacecraft, having received its spaceport designation from the Federal Aviation Administration on June 17, 2004. It received the suffixed formal name Mojave Air and Space Port at Rutan Field in 2022.

== History ==
In 1935, Kern County opened the Mojave Airport 0.5 miles (0.80 km) east of Mojave, California, to serve the gold and silver mining industry in the area. The airport had two dirt runways, one oiled, but no fueling or servicing facilities. In 1941, the Civil Aeronautics Board began improvements to the airport for national defense purposes that included two 4,500 by 150 feet (1,372 m × 46 m) asphalt runways and a taxiway. Kern County agreed the airport could be taken over by the military in the event of war.

After the Japanese attack on Pearl Harbor in December 1941, the United States Marine Corps took over the airport and expanded it into Marine Corps Auxiliary Air Station (MCAAS) in Mojave. The two runways were extended and a third one added. Barracks were constructed to house 2,734 male and 376 female military personnel. The expansion of MCAAS Mojave was done by Vinson & Pringle and Del E. Webb Construction Company out of Phoenix, Arizona. Civilian employment at the base would peak at 176. The Marines would eventually spend more than $7 million on the base, which totaled 2,312 acres (936 ha).

Many of the Corps' World War II aces received their gunnery training at Mojave. During World War II, Mojave hosted 29 aircraft squadrons, four Carrier Aircraft Service Detachments, and three Air Warning Squadrons. At its peak, the air station had 145 training and other aircraft. Mojave also had a 75 x 156 foot swimming pool that was used to train aviators in emergency water egress and for recreation. The base's 900-seat auditorium hosted several USO shows that featured Bob Hope, Frances Langford and Marilyn Maxwell.

With the end of World War II, MCAAS was disestablished on February 7, 1946; a United States Navy Air Station (NAS) was established the same day. The Navy used the airport for drone operations for less than a year, closing it on January 1, 1947. The base remained closed for four years until the outbreak of the Korean War. Mojave was reactivated as an auxiliary landing field to MCAS El Toro.

In 1951, scenes from the movie The Las Vegas Story were filmed at the deserted airport. A helicopter chased a car around the base, at several points flying at speed through an open-ended hangar. The control tower shown on the RHS of this article was featured at the climax of the chase. According to the American Film Institute (AFI), the "location shooting took place ..., at the Moroc Naval Air Base near Mojave, CA, ...".

On August 22, 1951, the 11th Naval District announced the award to R. R. Hensler, of Sun Valley, of a $1.307 million contract for the extension and strengthening of the runway at the Marine Corps auxiliary airfield.

The airport was recommissioned as a MCAAS on December 31, 1953. Squadrons used Mojave for ordnance training when El Toro had bad weather. Marine Corps reserve units were temporarily deployed to Mojave for two-week periods. MCAAS Mojave personnel peaked at 400 military and 200 civilians during this period.

In 1961, after the Marine Corps transferred operations to MCAS El Centro, Kern County, obtained title to the airport. In February 1972, the East Kern Airport District (EKAD) was formed to administer the airport. EKAD was the brainchild of Kern County rancher and aviator Dan Sabovich, who heavily lobbied the state for the airport district's creation and ran EKAD until 2002.

From 1974 to 1979, Golden West Airlines scheduled flights on de Havilland Canada DHC-6 Twin Otters direct to Los Angeles (LAX).

On November 20, 2012, the EKAD Board of Directors voted to change the name of the district to the Mojave Air and Space Port. Officials said that the spaceport name is well known around the world, but EKAD is not. The change took effect on January 1, 2013.

In 2022, "Rutan Field" was added to the airport's name in honor of the Rutan brothers (Burt and Dick), its board stating that the Rutans' aviation achievements "have played a key role in the evolution of the aerospace industry and the success of the Mojave Air & Space Port organization."

== Activities ==
Besides being a general-use public airport, Mojave has three main areas of activity: flight testing, space industry development, and aircraft heavy maintenance and storage.

=== Air racing ===
The airport has a rich history in air racing. In 1970, a 1,000-mile (1,600 km) Unlimited race was held—the first closed-course pylon race to include pit stops. The race was notable in that it featured a DC-7 that flew non-stop and finished sixth out of twenty aircraft. The race was won by Sherm Cooper in a highly modified Hawker Sea Fury which also flew non-stop. The following year the race was shortened to 1,000 kilometres (620 mi), and was again won by a Hawker Sea Fury, this time flown by Frank Sanders. From 1973 to 1979 Air Race Management (run by famed race pilots Clay Lacy and Lyle Shelton) organized a series of Reno-syle races at Mojave featuring Unlimiteds, T-6's, Formula-1's, and Biplanes. In 1973 and '74, the program also included jet races. Unlimited winners at Mojave included Lyle Shelton in 1973, Mac McClain in 1974 and 1976, Dr. Cliff Cummins in 1975, and Steve Hinton in 1978 and '79. The races at Mojave were hampered by constant winds, and extreme temperatures. In the 2000s, California HWY 58 was extended to bypass the town of Mojave, which cut directly across the race course—thus precluding any future racing events on the site. In 1983, Frank Taylor set the 15 kilometer (9.3 mile) closed-course speed record at 517 miles per hour (832 km/h) at Mojave in the P-51 Mustang racer Dago Red . Over the years, several notable teams have been based out of Mojave.

In 1990 Scaled Composites rolled out the radical Pond Racer, built and tested on-site. In the mid-1990s, the Museum of Flying based its two racers Dago Red and Stiletto out of Mojave as well. Since the early 1980s, the Wildfire (a custom-built Unlimited based around a T-6 airframe designed by William H. Statler) has slowly been developed in a Mojave hangar. Ralph Wise's many air racing projects, including the Sport Class Legal GT400 and his V-8 powered unlimited, the GT500, both were designed and built at Mojave (the GT500 spent its early life at Camarillo). The GT 400 Quicksilver ultralight program is also based out of Mojave.

=== Flight testing ===
Flight testing activities have been centered at Mojave since the early 1970s, due to the lack of populated areas surrounding the airport. It is also favored for this purpose due to its proximity to Edwards Air Force Base, where the airspace is restricted from ground level to an unlimited height, and where there is a supersonic corridor. Mojave is also the home of the National Test Pilot School, Scaled Composites and Virgin Galactic/The Spaceship Company.

=== Space industry development ===
Beginning with the Rotary Rocket program, Mojave became a focus for small companies seeking a place to develop space access technologies. Mojave Spaceport has been a test site for several teams in the Ansari X Prize, most notably the Scaled Composites SpaceShipOne, which conducted the first privately funded human sub-orbital flight on June 21, 2004. Other groups based at the Mojave Spaceport include or have included XCOR Aerospace, Masten Space Systems, Virgin Galactic, The Spaceship Company, Stratolaunch Systems, and Firestar Technologies. Other companies with operations at Mojave include or have included Orbital Sciences Corporation, Vector Launch and Interorbital Systems.

The East Kern Airport District was given spaceport status by the Federal Aviation Administration for the Mojave Air and Spaceport through June 16, 2019.

=== Aircraft heavy maintenance, storage, and event center ===
The Mojave airport is also known as a storage location for commercial airliners, due to the vast area and dry desert conditions. Numerous Boeing, McDonnell Douglas, Lockheed, and Airbus jetliners, including wide-body aircraft previously or currently owned by major domestic and international airlines, are stored at Mojave. Some aircraft reach the end of their useful lifetime and are scrapped at the Mojave aircraft boneyard, while others are refurbished and returned to active service.

The airport refurbished an old United States Marine Corps hangar from the World War II era into a modern event center. It was previously used for water survival training then transformed into the Stuart O. Witt Event Center with over 23,000 square feet (2,100 m^{2}) of multi-use space.

== First flights and significant events ==
- July 1, 1942 — Construction begins on Marine Corps Auxiliary Air Station at Mojave.
- July 31, 1944 — USMC Capt. Edward Shaw, a decorated World War II ace, was killed while test-flying an F4U Corsair
- February 7, 1946 — MCAAS disestablished.
- December 31, 1953 — MCAAS Mojave re-established.
- May 21, 1975 — First flight of the Rutan VariEze
- June 30, 1978 — First flight of the Rutan Defiant
- June 12, 1979 — First flight of the prototype of the Rutan Long-EZ
- April 3, 1980 — First prototype Bombardier Challenger 600 crashed in the Mojave desert, killing one of the pilots; flight test program was operating from Mojave at the time.
- September 25, 1981 — National Test Pilot School opens
- August 23, 1983 — First flight of the Boeing Skyfox
- August 29, 1983 — First flight of Beech/Scaled Composites Model 115 Starship
- January 7, 1986 — Voyager homecoming, after round-the-world record flight.
- July 12, 1988 — First flight of the Scaled Composites Triumph
- February 19, 1990 — First flight of the Scaled Composites ARES
- July 26, 1998 — First flight of the Scaled Composites Proteus
- March 1, 1999 — Rollout of the Rotary Rocket Roton ATV.
- July 28, 1999 — First flight of the Rotary Rocket Roton ATV.
- October 12, 1999 — Third, final and longest flight of Rotary Rocket Roton ATV.
- October 8, 2000 — First firing of an XCOR Aerospace LOX-powered rocket engine.
- July 21, 2001 — First flight of the XCOR EZ-Rocket, flown by Dick Rutan (single-engine configuration).
- October 6, 2001 — First flight of a twin engine rocket plane, again the XCOR EZ-rocket.
- May 31, 2002 — First flight of the Toyota TAA-1, built by Scaled Composites.
- July 24, 2002 — First touch-and-go of a rocket-powered aircraft, the XCOR EZ-Rocket (world record).
- August 1, 2002 — First flight of Scaled Composites White Knight
- September 18, 2002 — First flight of world's largest jet engine, GE90-115B on GE's Boeing 747 testbed aircraft.
- May 20, 2003 — First captive flight, uncrewed, of SpaceShipOne
- July 29, 2003 — First crewed captive flight of SpaceShipOne
- August 7, 2003 — First free-flight of SpaceShipOne
- December 17, 2003 — First powered flight of SpaceShipOne, on 100th anniversary of powered flight by the Wright Brothers.
- March 5, 2004 — First flight of the Virgin Atlantic GlobalFlyer
- June 17, 2004 — Mojave designated a Spaceport by the FAA.
- June 21, 2004 — SpaceShipOne flight 15P, the first spaceflight of SpaceShipOne.
- September 29, 2004 — First Ansari X Prize flight of SpaceShipOne.
- October 4, 2004 — X-Prize-winning flight of SpaceShipOne.
- June 21, 2005 — First captive flight of Boeing X-37 under Scaled Composites White Knight
- December 3, 2005 — First departure of a rocket-powered aircraft on a point-to-point flight (XCOR EZ-Rocket, departed MHV for California City, flown by Dick Rutan).
- December 15, 2005 — First arrival of a rocket-powered aircraft on a flight originating at another airport (XCOR EZ-Rocket return flight from California City, piloted by Rick Searfoss).
- April 7, 2006 — First free flight of Boeing X-37 (take-off from Mojave, landing at Edwards)
- January 23, 2007 — First flight of the Lockheed CATBird
- July 26, 2007 — Explosion with at least three fatalities at Scaled Composites facility.
- January, 2008 — Arrival of C-GAUN involved in the incident of Air Canada Flight 143 for retirement.
- December 21, 2008 — First flight of Scaled Composites WhiteKnightTwo
- October 7, 2009 — Lunar Lander Challenge flight by Masten Space Systems wins second place for Level 1 of the NASA competition
- October 30, 2009 — Lunar Lander Challenge flight by Masten Space Systems wins first place for Level 2 of the NASA competition
- January 16, 2010 — AOPA president Craig Fuller came to speak at MHV.
- May 26, 2010 — Masten Space Systems completes the first ever flight of a vertical take-off, vertical landing (VTVL) vehicle with successfully re-light the rocket engine.
- October 10, 2010 — First flight of Scaled Composites SpaceShipTwo
- February 9, 2011 — First flight of Scaled Composites Firebird
- March 30, 2011 — First flight of Scaled Composites BiPod
- January 20, 2012 — Stratolaunch Systems breaks ground for production facility and hangar.
- November 5, 2012 — First flight of Wasabi Air Racing Siren
- April 20, 2013 — Mojave Experimental Fly-in
- April 29, 2013 — First rocket powered flight of Scaled Composites SpaceShipTwo
- April 16–20, 2014 — Mojave Experimental Fly-in and Week of Record Setting
- July 28, 2014 — Mo'Venture Team Flies Non-Stop to EAA Airventure 2014 in Oshkosh Wisconsin
- October 31, 2014 — The VSS Enterprise, a Scaled Composites SpaceShipTwo class experimental test flight vehicle, crashes during a test flight, killing one of the pilots and injuring the other.
- May 3, 2017 - First suborbital test flight of prototype rocket Vector-R 0.1 by Vector Space Systems
- December 13, 2018 - The VSS Unity, a Virgin Galactic SpaceShipTwo class vehicle, reaches suborbital spaceflight for the first time.
- April 13, 2019 - First flight of Stratolaunch Systems aircraft, the world's largest aircraft by wingspan.
- May 25, 2020 - First launch of Launcher One by Virgin Orbit (sibling company of Virgin Galactic), which failed shortly after ignition
- January 17, 2021 - First successful Launcher One mission, ELaNa XX

== Civilian Aerospace Test Center test programs ==
- Boeing X-37
- Eclipse 500 (crosswind landing data)
- General Electric CF34
- General Electric GE90
- Lockheed CATBird (post modification and systems flight test)
- Lockheed Martin F-22 Raptor (crosswind landing data)
- Lockheed Martin VH-71 Kestrel
- McDonnell Douglas MD-90-30
- Air Tractor 401 modified with an Orenda Aerospace OE600 engine (certification flight test program)
- Rotary Rocket
- Scaled Composites White Knight and SpaceShipOne
- Sino Swearingen SJ30-2 (envelope expansion, flutter, stability and control, crosswind takeoffs and landings)
- Virgin Atlantic GlobalFlyer
- Adaptive Compliant Wing developed by FlexSys Inc flight tested on White Knight

== World records set ==
- FAI Class C-1, unlimited weight
  - Group 1, internal combustion engine
    - Speed over a straight 15/25 km course: P-51 Mustang N5410V piloted by Frank Taylor, 832.12 km/h, July 30, 1983.
  - Group 3, turbojet
    - Speed over recognised course: Mojave to Gander, Newfoundland, Canadair Challenger CL601 N601TG piloted by Aziz Ojjeh, 816.48 km/h July 24, 1984.
  - Group 4, rocket engine
    - Altitude Gain, Airplane Launched from a Carrier Aircraft: 85,743 meters, SpaceShipOne piloted by Mike Melvill, June 21, 2004.
    - Distance: 16 km, XCOR EZRocket piloted by Dick Rutan, December 3, 2005
- FAI Class C-1a, Landplanes: takeoff weight 300 to 500 kg
  - Group 1, internal combustion engine
    - Distance, Rutan VariEze piloted by Frank Hertzler, Mojave to Martinsburg, West Virginia, 3,563.02 km, July 15, 1984.
    - Speed over 3 km course with restricted altitude: Sharp Nemesis piloted by Jon Sharp, 466.83 km/h, November 15, 1998 (aircraft now on display at the National Air and Space Museum)
    - Speed over straight 15/25 km course: Sharp Nemesis piloted by Jon Sharp, 454.77 km/h, October 31, 1998.
- FAI Class C-1b, Landplanes: takeoff weight 500 to 1000 kg
  - Group 1, internal combustion engine
    - Distance over a closed course: Rutan Long-EZ N79RA piloted by Dick Rutan, 7,725.3 km, December 15, 1979.
    - Speed over a closed circuit of 2,000 km without payload. Rutan Catbird N187RA piloted by Dick Rutan, 401.46 km/h, January 29, 1994.
    - Speed over straight 3 km course: GP-5 Sweet Dreams piloted by Lee Behel, 377.6 m/h, April 12, 2014.
    - Speed over straight 15/25 km course: GP-5 Sweet Dreams piloted by Lee Behel, 378.7 m/h, April 12, 2014.
    - Time To Climb 3 km: GP-5 Sweet Dreams piloted by Lee Behel, 2:00 min, April 12, 2014.
  - Group 4, Rocket engine
    - Distance: 16 km, XCOR EZ-Rocket piloted by Dick Rutan, December 3, 2005
- FAI Class C-1c, Landplanes: takeoff weight 1000 to 1750 kg
  - Group 1, internal combustion engine
    - Speed over a closed circuit of 2,000 km without payload. Rutan Catbird N187RA piloted by Mike Melvill, 413.78 km/h, March 2, 1994.
    - Speed Over a Recognized Course. Mooney 20J N201KC piloted by Christopher Freeze, 280.52 km/h, May 19, 2009
    - Speed over a closed circuit of 1,000 km without payload. Lancair Legacy piloted by Mike Patey, 319 m/h, April 18, 2014.
    - Speed over a closed circuit of 2,000 km without payload. Lancair Legacy piloted by Mike Patey, 319 m/h, April 18, 2014.
    - Speed over a closed circuit of 5,000 km without payload. Rutan Catbird N187RA piloted by Zachary Reeder, 344.44 km/h, April 14, 2014.
- FAI Class C-1d, Landplanes: takeoff weight 1750 to 3000 kg
  - Group 1, internal combustion engine
    - Distance over a closed course, Rutan Voyager N269VA, piloted by Dick Rutan and Jeana Yeager, Vandenberg, California to Mojave, 18,658.16 km, July 15, 1986.
  - Group 4, rocket engine
    - Altitude Gain, Airplane Launched from a Carrier Aircraft: 85,743 meters, SpaceShipOne piloted by Mike Melvill, June 21, 2004.
- FAI Class C-1e, Landplanes: takeoff weight 3,000 to 6,000 kg
  - Group 2, turbojet
    - Altitude: Scaled Composites Proteus N281PR, piloted by Mike Melvill and Robert Waldmiller, 19,277 m, October 25, 2000.
    - Altitude in horizontal flight: Scaled Composites Proteus N281PR, piloted by Mike Melvill and Robert Waldmiller, 19,015 m, October 25, 2000.
    - Altitude with 1,000 kg payload: Scaled Composites Proteus N281PR, piloted by Mike Melvill and Robert Waldmiller, 17,067 m, October 27, 2000.

== Notable pilots, engineers and other people ==
- Brian Binnie
- Fitzhugh L. Fulton
- Mike Melvill—pilot of SpaceShipOne
- Burt Rutan—founder of Scaled Composites
- Dick Rutan—pilot of the first non-stop, un-refueled flight around the world with Jeana Yeager in the Rutan Voyager
- Richard A. Searfoss
- Doug Shane
- Peter Siebold
- Jim Tighe
- George T. Whitesides—CEO of Virgin Galactic
- Stuart O. Witt—former CEO of Mojave Air and Space Port and member of the National Space Council Users Advisory Group
- Jeana Yeager—pilot of the first non-stop, unrefueled flight around the world with Dick Rutan in the Rutan Voyager

== Accidents and incidents ==
On July 26, 2007, there was a test stand accident at Scaled Composites that killed three employees and injured three others. The accident occurred during work on Virgin Galactic's SpaceShipTwo.

On February 4, 2009, Douglas DC-3-65/AR N834TP of the National Test Pilot School was substantially damaged in a take-off accident. Both sets of undercarriage and the port engine were ripped off. The aircraft was on a local training flight. The accident was caused by an incorrectly set rudder trim.

On Oct. 31, 2014, the SpaceShipTwo spacecraft VSS Enterprise broke up during a test flight after being dropped from the WhiteKnightTwo VMS Eve carrier aircraft. Scaled Composites co-pilot Michael Alsbury was killed. Scaled Composites pilot Peter Siebold parachuted to safety. SpaceShipTwo was being developed by Scaled Composites for Sir Richard Branson's Virgin Galactic company. The accident occurred about 20 miles (32 km) north of the Mojave Air & Space Port, where the test flight originated.

== See also ==
- List of airports in Kern County, California
- List of United States Marine Corps installations
- Grey Butte Auxiliary Airfield—Used by Mojave Marine Corps Air Station (MCAS) in WW2
