= Lee Behel =

American air-racer

- Born: Wesley Behel; October 31, 1950; California, U.S.
- Died: September 8, 2014 (aged 63); Reno, Nevada, U.S.
- Cause of death: Aircraft crash due to structural failure
- Organization(s): President, Sport Class Aviation
- Known for: Racing aircraft

Wesley "Lee" Behel Jr (31 October, 1950 - 8 September, 2014) was an American aviator and air racing champion. He was the creator and, at the time of his death, the president of the "Sport Class", a group of racing airplanes designed for planes under 1000 cubic inches in engine size that participate in the Reno Air Races every September, as well as a retired Lt. Colonel in the Nevada Air National Guard.

Behel joined the Nevada Air National Guard in 1972, where he flew several aircraft, including the F-101 Voodoo, the F4 Phantom in which he accumulated 2,500 hours of flight time, as well as the RF-4C reconnaissance aircraft. He reached the rank of Lieutenant Colonel in April 1993. He retired from the Guard in 1996.

Behel was a certified fighter jet pilot who also enjoyed flying high-performance single-engine race planes. Behel had once owned Steven's Creek Porsche/Audi in Santa Clara, a business that he had sold in 2012.

== Air racing and records ==
In 2000, he first flew in the AirVenture Cup Race, a cross-country open-circuit air race, with his ten-year-old son Jay on board. He would fly that race fifteen straight years.

He bought his Andy Chiavetta-built Lancair Legacy race plane "Breathless" in 2002. At the time of his death he held the world speed records for the RF-4C in 100 and 500 km closed courses.

In 2009, Behel purchased his close friend Vicki Cruse's race plane, "Cruse Missile" after her death. He encouraged and supported other aviators to participate in the "Sport Class", offering "Cruse Missile" to later air race champion Vicky Benzing to race at Reno.

In 2010, Behel purchased "Sweet Dreams", a custom built, one of a kind experimental GP-5 aircraft powered by a Chevrolet small-block engine. He first piloted the plane at the 2010 Reno Air Races. After the race, he worked to make the plane faster. Behel rebuilt the plane's engine and made further modifications. In 2012, Behel took Sweet Dreams to the Reno Air Races to race in the new Sport-Gold Class. It qualified at 363.233 mph, finished third in two of the heat races, fourth in the other heat race, and finished fourth in the Sport-Gold race at 359.573 mph.

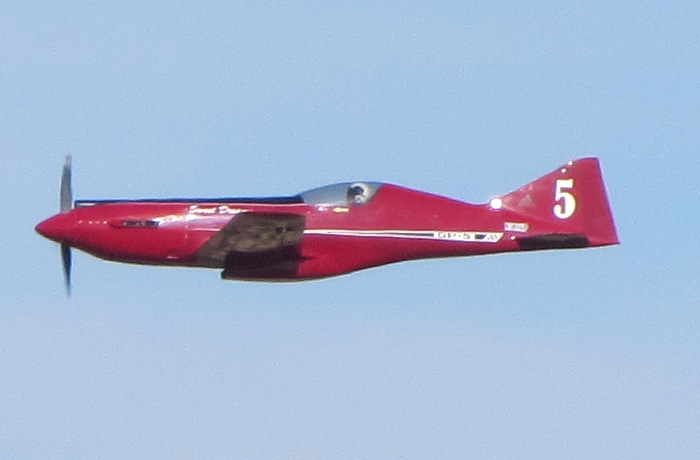
Sweet Dreams, piloted by Behel

In April 2014, Behel set three class world records in Sweet Dreams at the Experimental Fly-In at the Mojave Air and Space Port in Mojave, California: Speed over a 3 kilometres (1.9 mi) course, 3 km time-to-climb, and speed over a 15 kilometres (9.3 mi) course.

== Accident and aftermath ==
On 8 September 2014, Behel perished while flying Sweet Dreams during a qualifying heat at the Reno Air Races.

On the morning of the accident, Behel conducted a practice flight with Sweet Dreams. During the flight, he called a mayday, reporting to the crew chief that the airplane began to shake when he applied power. Afterwards, he told another competitor in the Sport Class that he "thought the airplane was going to come apart it was shaking so badly". Despite these concerns, Behel would take part in the qualifying race later that afternoon.

The crash took place in the north end of the race course when the plane Behel was flying suffered a "catastrophic mechanical failure" at 3:16 p.m. According to witnesses, the aircraft took off and flew to enter the course. Around the 5th outer pylon, in an area of the course known as "High-G Ridge", sections of the right wing broke away from the airplane, which then rolled sharply to the right and impacted the ground. The aircraft was estimated to be traveling nearly 400 miles per hour (640 km/h) and was no more than 100 feet (30 m) off the ground when the failure occurred.

The crash occurred during a qualifying heat early in the 2014 Reno Air Race program and was investigated by the NTSB as well as the FAA. The accident report stated the aircraft wreckage was removed and disposed of without permission before it could be analyzed by the FAA.

The Sport Class racing division named the perpetual "Race Angel" award to the fastest woman aviator in Behel's honor.

== World records ==
- 1995 – Speed over a closed circuit of 500 km without payload
- 1995 – Speed over a closed circuit of 100 km without payload
- 2002 – Speed over a 3 km course
- 2014 – Time to climb to a height of 3 000 m
- 2014 – Speed over a 15 km course
- 2014 – Speed over a 3 km course

== Race results ==
- 2008 – First place, Reno Sport Class – 341.95 mph, Lancair Legacy, #5, Breathless
- 2010 – Second place, Reno Sport Class – 331.310 mph, Lancair Legacy, #5, Breathless
