= Stuart O. Witt =

American naval officer, test pilot and aerospace executive

- Born: November 1, 1952 (age 73); Bakersfield, California
- Education: California State University Northridge
- Occupations: Founder & Owner, S.O. Witt & Associates, LLC
- Spouse: Susan Witt
- Children: 3

Stuart O. Witt (born November 1, 1952) is the Founder and Owner of S.O. Witt & Associates, LLC. Witt is the former CEO of Mojave Air and Space Port and a member of the National Space Council Users Advisory Group.

== Biography ==
=== Early life and education ===
Stu Witt was born in Bakersfield, California, raised in Onyx, California and attended primary school in Isabella, California. He graduated from California State University Northridge in 1974 and is a 1996 graduate of the University of Maryland's Center for Creative Leadership. Witt was 19-years-old when he first learned to fly and earned his Private Pilot License.

=== Career ===
Witt received his pilot wings as a naval aviator with the United States Navy in 1976. He flew the F-14 Tomcat as a carrier based pilot on the USS John F. Kennedy (CV-67). In 1980, Witt graduated from the US Navy Fighter Weapons School TOPGUN. Later in his military career, Witt would serve as an F/A-18A project pilot at the Naval Air Warfare Center at Naval Air Weapons Station China Lake.

Witt then transitioned to Westinghouse Electronic Systems as an engineering test pilot on the B-1B, F-16C and YF-23 development programs. From 1993 to 2002, Witt served as an Executive Vice President with CTA, Inc.

In 2002, Witt became the CEO & General Manager of the Mojave Air and Space Port located in Mojave, California. In 2004, the airport was the first location to be designated an inland space port. On October 4, 2004, Mojave was host to the Ansari X Prize where SpaceShipOne, designed by Burt Rutan and financed by Paul Allen, won the $10 million prize and marked the birth of the commercial spaceflight industry. Witt has been credited with recruiting nearly all of the sixty-nine companies that currently call Mojave home, including Paul Allen's Stratolaunch and Richard Branson's Virgin Galactic.

Witt has testified before Congress about the benefits of commercial space flight. Witt was instrumental in promoting legislation in California that would limit the liability of commercial spacecraft operators. California Assembly Bill AB2243, the Space Flight Liability and Immunity Act, was signed by Governor Jerry Brown in 2012 after passing through the California House of Representatives with a unanimous 73-0 vote. Also in 2012, Witt gave a TED Talk at TEDxKiruna. It was during a 2014 interview with BBC and Witt where Mojave received its most famous tag line - the "Silicon Valley of Space." Witt retired as the CEO of Mojave Air and Space Port in January 2016.

In 2016, it was reported that Witt was being considered for several leadership roles at NASA including the Administrator and Deputy Administrator positions. On February 20, 2018, Witt was named to the National Space Council Users Advisory Group by Vice President Mike Pence. Witt is Chairman Emeritus and a founding executive member of the Commercial Spaceflight Federation.

Witt is Chairman Emeritus of the Kern Community College District Board of Trustees.

=== Personal life ===
Witt is an avid outdoorsman and hunter. He holds an Airline Transport Pilot license and owns a Mooney M20 which is based at the Inyokern Airport. Witt is an Associate Fellow member of the Society of Experimental Test Pilots.

He is married to the former Susan Etoch and they reside in Ridgecrest, California. They have three grown sons. In addition to his childhood and current residence, much of Witt's professional career, including assignments at China Lake, California and Mojave, California has been based in California's Kern County.
