= Volmer VJ-22 Sportsman =

VJ-22 Sportsman
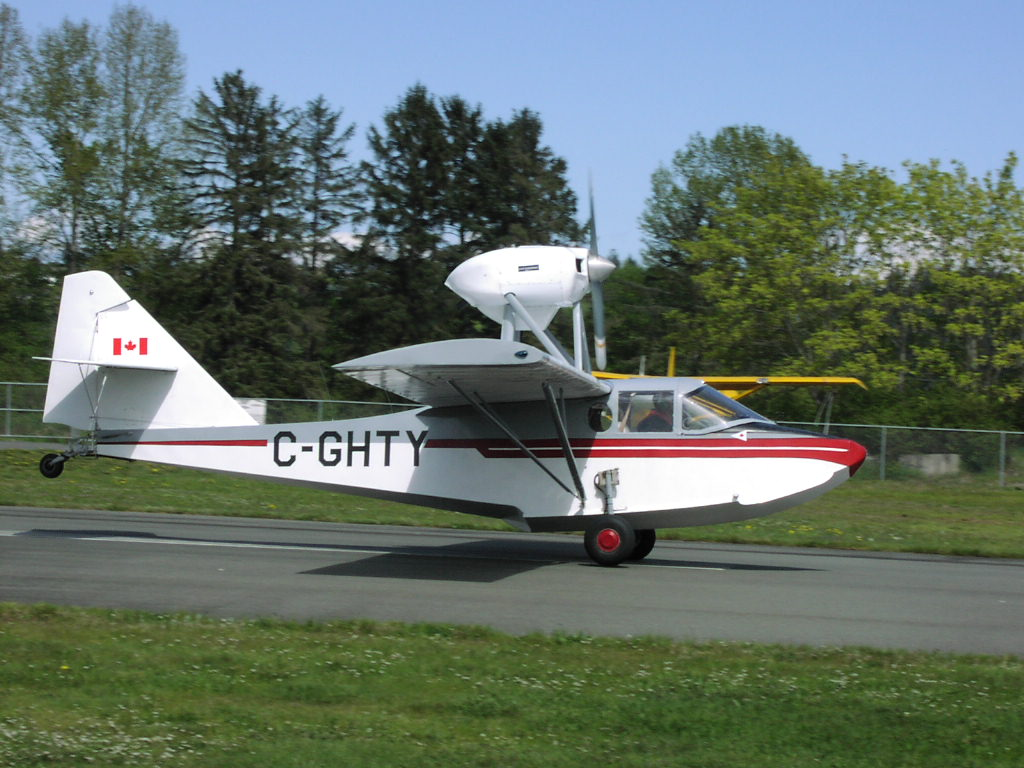

General information
- Type: Homebuilt amphibian
- National origin: United States of America
- Designer: Volmer Jensen

History
- First flight: 22 December 1958

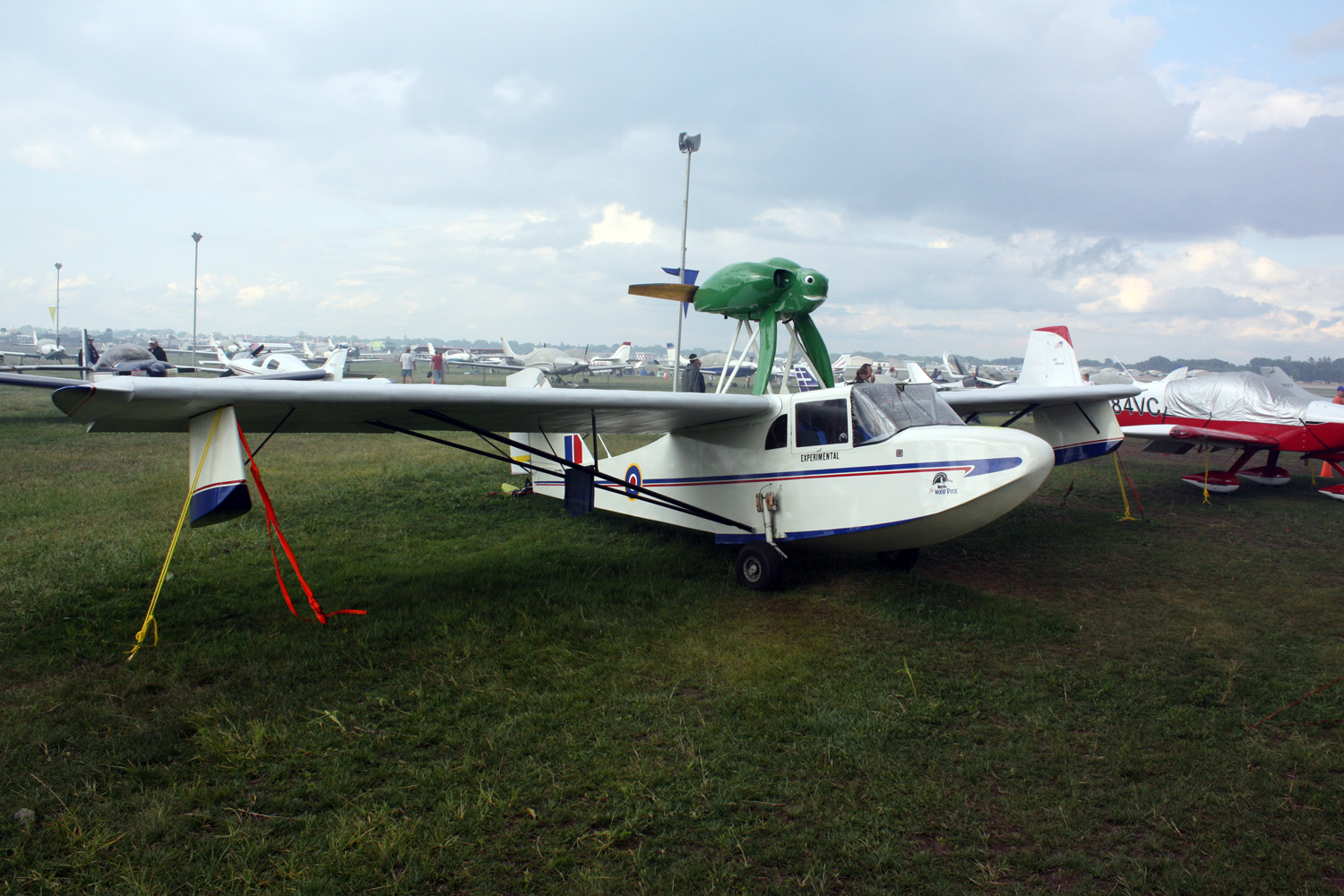
Volmer Sportsman at Airventure 2009

The Volmer VJ-22 Sportsman is an American homebuilt amphibious aircraft. The Sportsman is a two-seat high-winged monoplane of wood and fabric construction, with over 100 built by 1993.

== Development and design ==
Volmer Jensen, a successful designer of sailplanes, designed the two-seat amphibious VJ-22 in 1957. The new aircraft, at first called the Chubasco, made its first flight on 22 December 1958.

The VJ-22 is a high-winged monoplane, using the wings from an Aeronca Champion or Chief, with a new flying boat hull of mahogany plywood, waterproofed with fiberglass cloth. The aircraft's single engine, normally a pusher of between 85 hp (63 kW) and 100 hp (75 kW), is mounted on pylons above the wing centre section. The engine can also be mounted in tractor configuration and engines of up to 135 hp (101 kW) have been used successfully. A retractable tailwheel undercarriage is provided. The pilot and passenger sit side by side under an enclosed canopy, and are provided with dual controls.

== Operational history ==
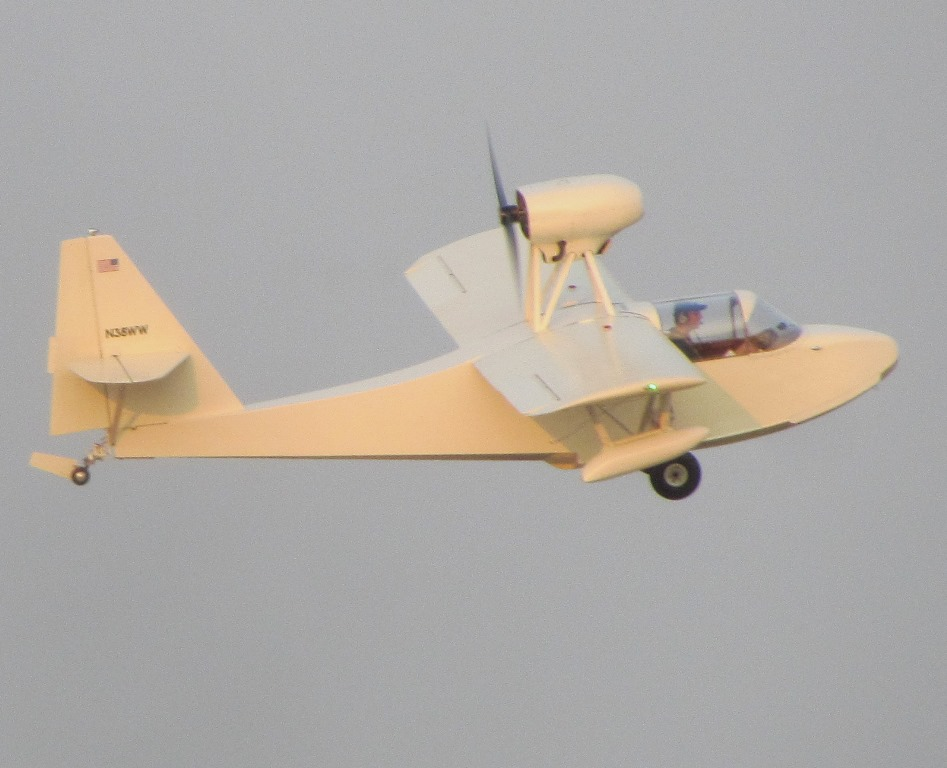
Volmer VJ-22 Sportsman takeoff

While Jensen attempted unsuccessfully to get the Sportsman built commercially, plans for the VJ-22 were made available to amateur builders, with 889 plans sold and over 100 completed by 1993.

The Volmer Club of America is a 501(c)4 organization established by Robert Albrecht of Louisiana to continue the legacy of the VJ-22 and make plans and specifications for its construction available to the public.

== Specifications (85 hp engine) ==
Data from Jane's All The World's Aircraft 1993-94

General characteristics

- Crew: 2
- Length: 24 ft 0 in (7.32 m)
- Wingspan: 36 ft 6 in (11.13 m)
- Height: 8 ft 0 in (2.44 m)
- Wing area: 175.0 sq ft (16.26 m^{2})
- Empty weight: 1,000 lb (454 kg)
- Max takeoff weight: 1,500 lb (680 kg)
- Fuel capacity: 20 US Gallons (76 L)
- Powerplant: 1 × Continental C85 air-cooled flat-four, 90 hp (67 kW)

Performance

- Maximum speed: 95 mph (153 km/h, 83 kn)
- Cruise speed: 85 mph (137 km/h, 74 kn)
- Stall speed: 45 mph (72 km/h, 39 kn)
- Range: 300 mi (480 km, 260 nmi) (max fuel, no reserves)
- Service ceiling: 13,000 ft (4,000 m)
- Rate of climb: 600 ft/min (3.0 m/s)

== See also ==
Aircraft of comparable role, configuration, and era

- Anderson Kingfisher
- Osprey Osprey 2
- Taylor Coot
- Thurston Teal
