= Reno Air Races =

Airplane competition in Nevada

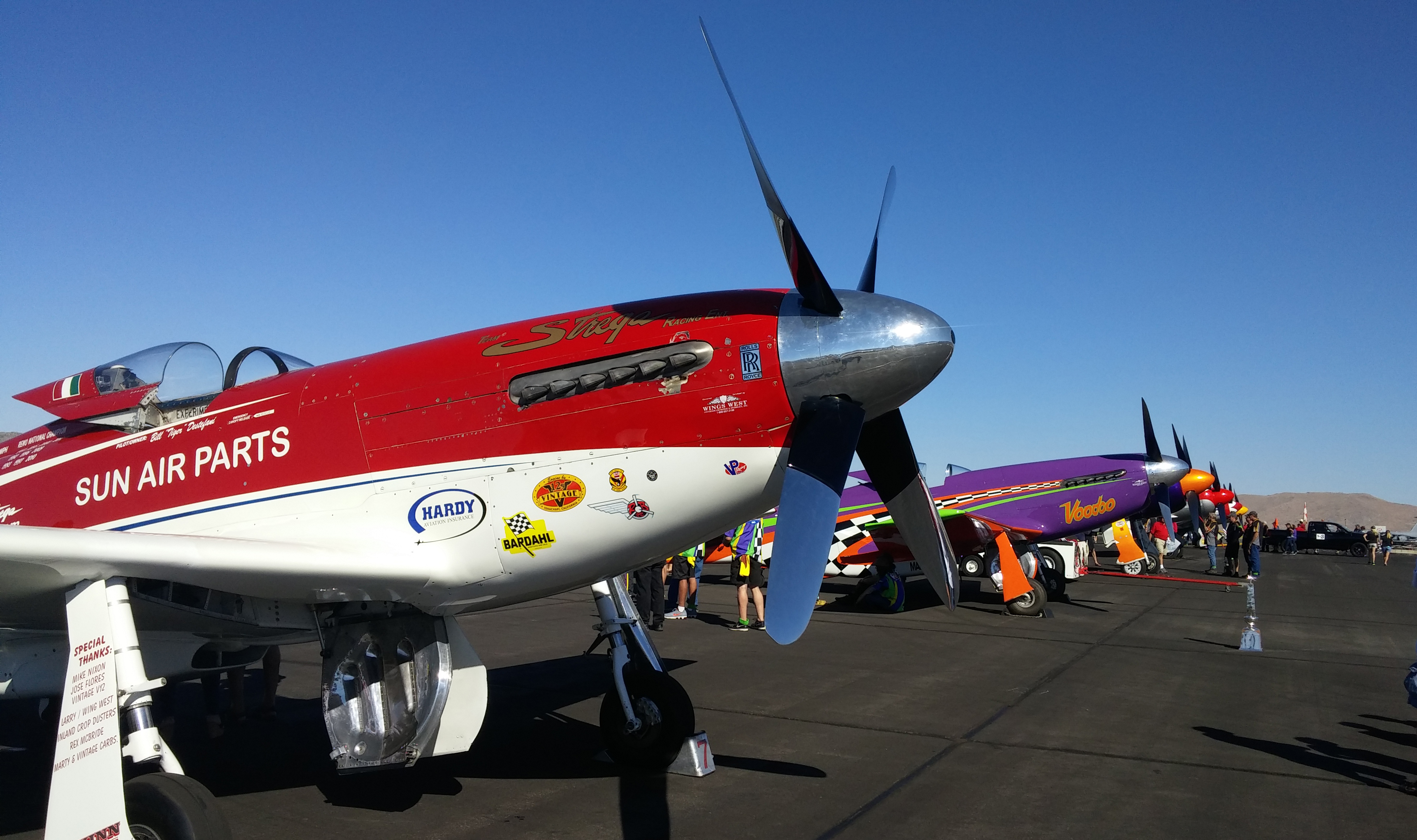
- 2015 Reno Unlimited Gold Line Up
- Status: racing ended at Reno; now in Roswell
- Date: 1964
- Venue: 1964–1965 Sky Ranch Airport; 1966–2023 Reno Stead Airport; 2025– Roswell Airport
- Country: United States
- Inaugurated: 1964
- Most recent: 2023 at Reno
- Sponsor: Reno Air Racing Association
- Website: airrace.org

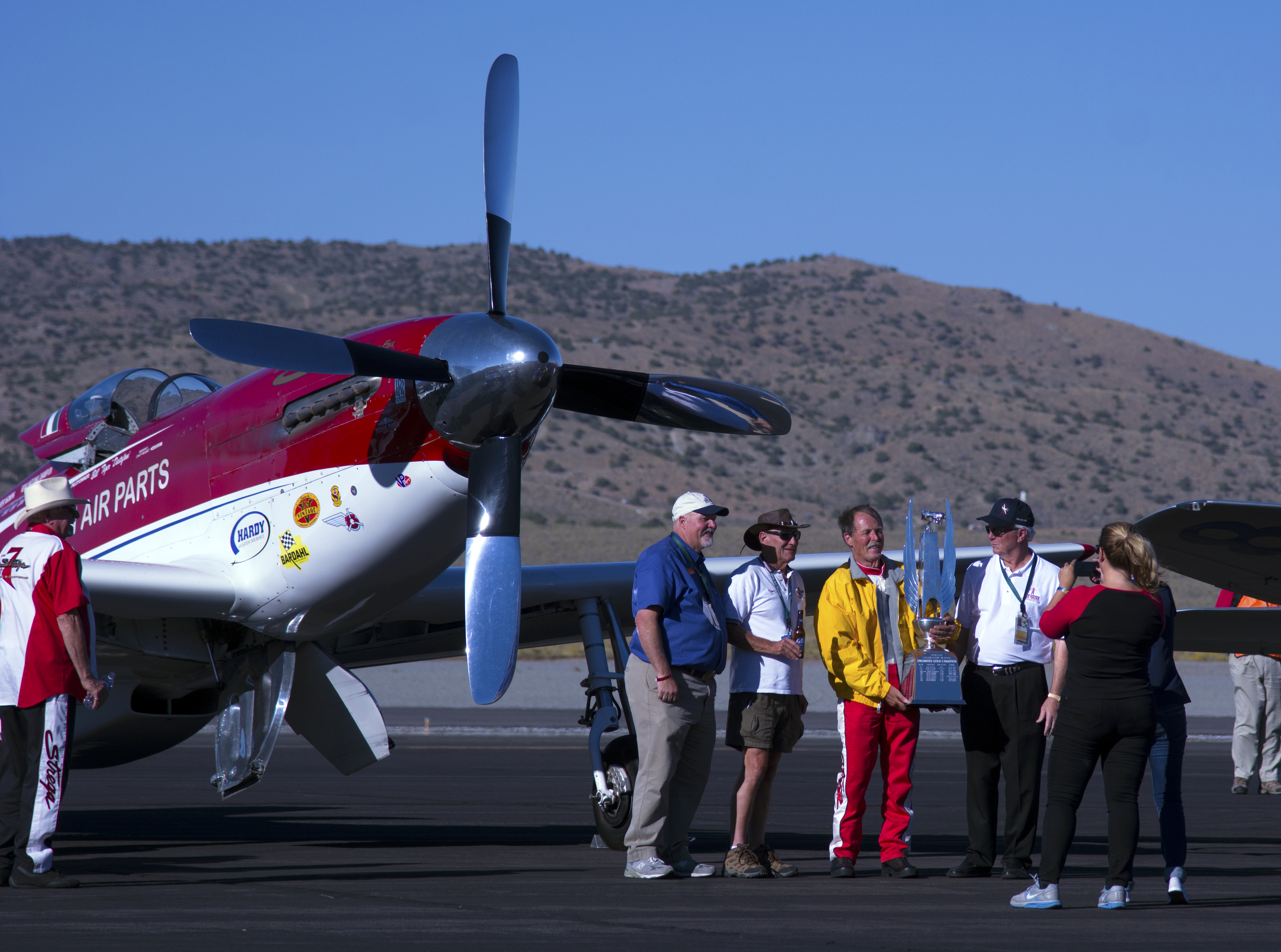
Strega, with pilots "Tiger" Destefani and "Hoot" Gibson, the 2015 Unlimited Air Race Champions

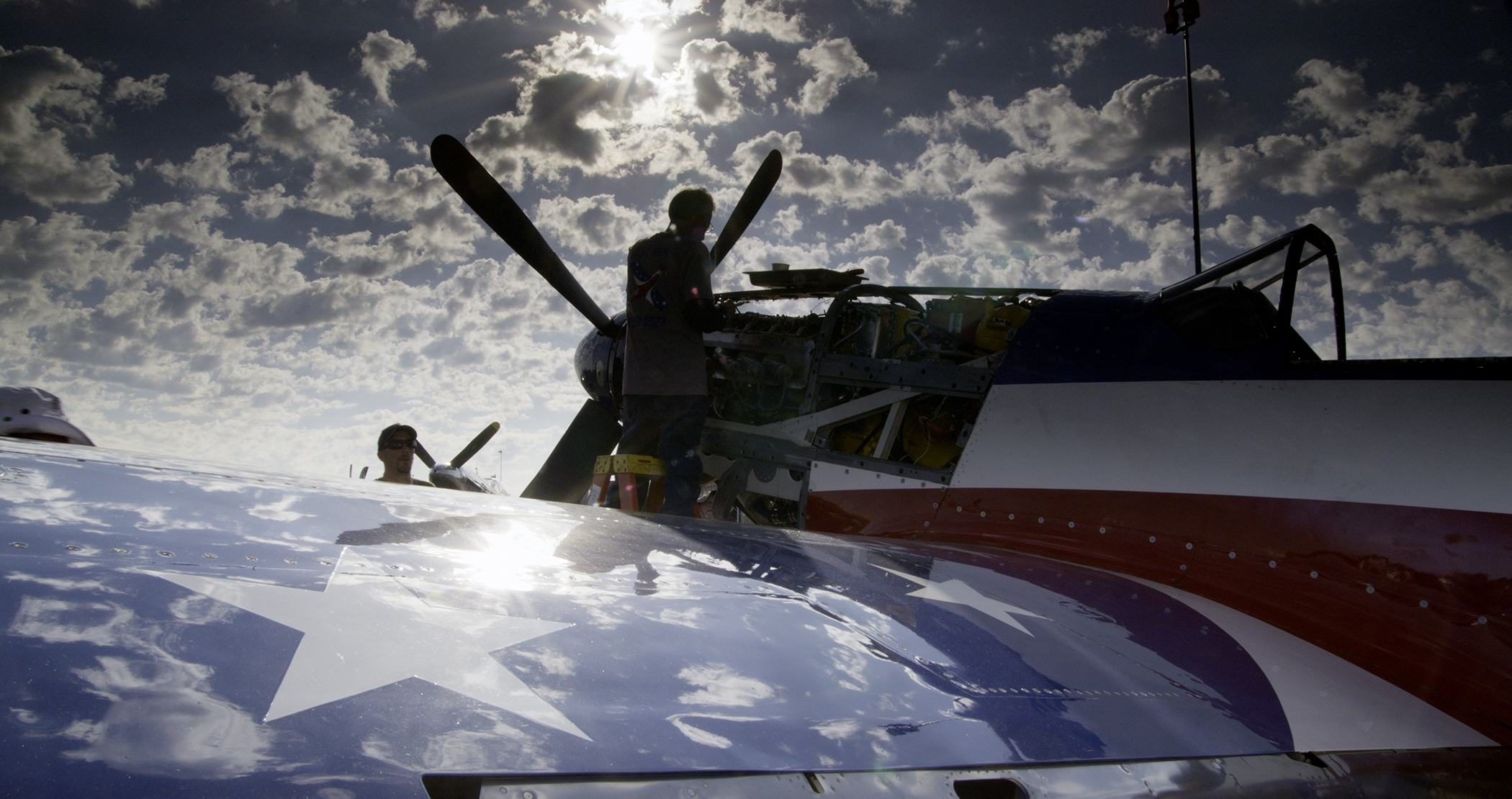
Miss America Preparing for final Air Race 2023

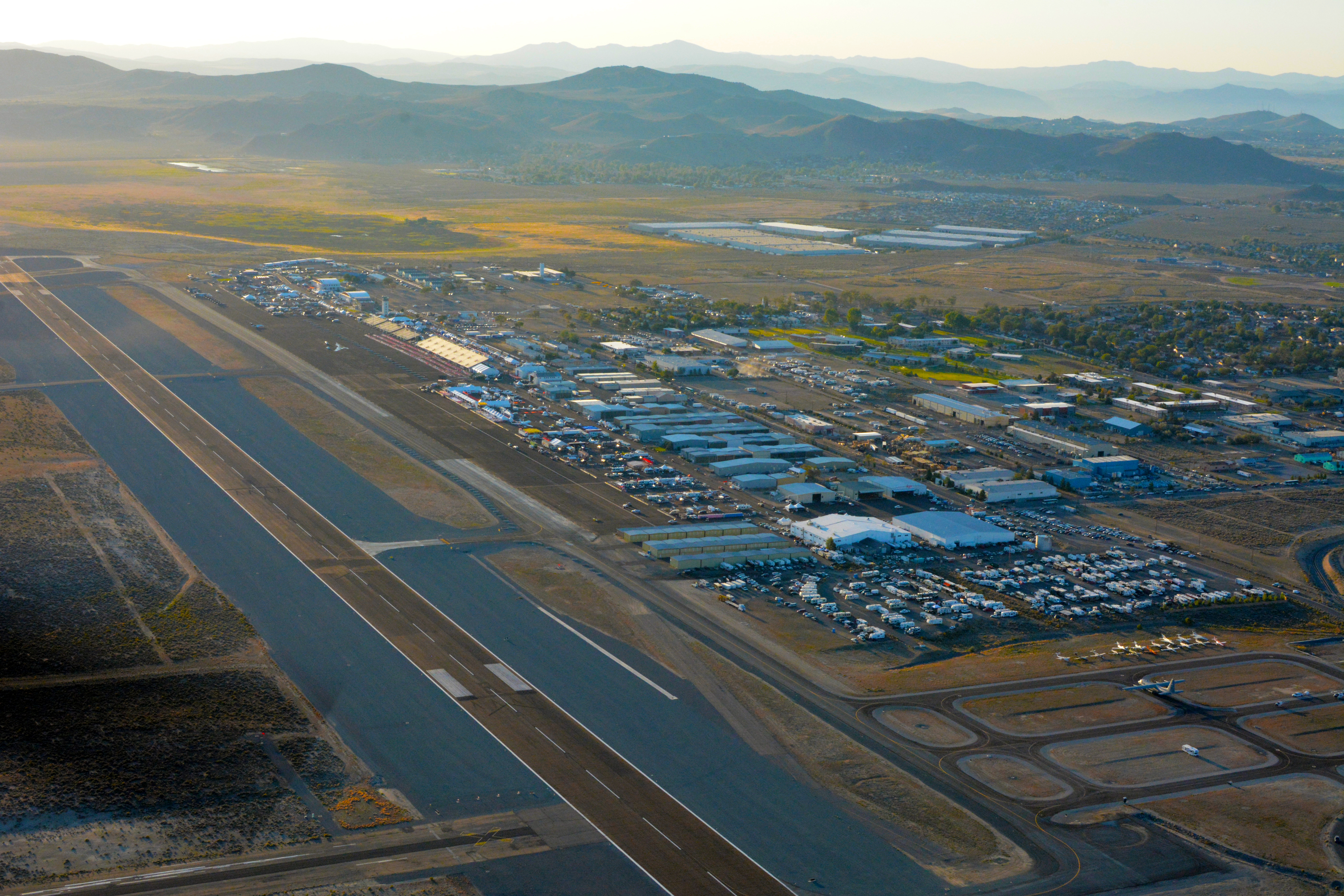
Aerial view of Reno Stead Airport, during 2014 Reno Air Races

The National Championship Air Races, commonly known as the Reno Air Races until 2023 and Roswell Air Races after 2025, are a multi-day event tailored to the aviation community that took place each September in Nevada. The races were held at the Reno Stead Airport a few miles north of Reno, Nevada, until 2023. In 2025, the Reno Air Racing Association resumed racing at a new venue in Roswell. Air racing is billed as "the world's fastest motor sport" and Reno was one of the few remaining venues. The event includes races in six classes and demonstrations by airshow pilots.

== History ==
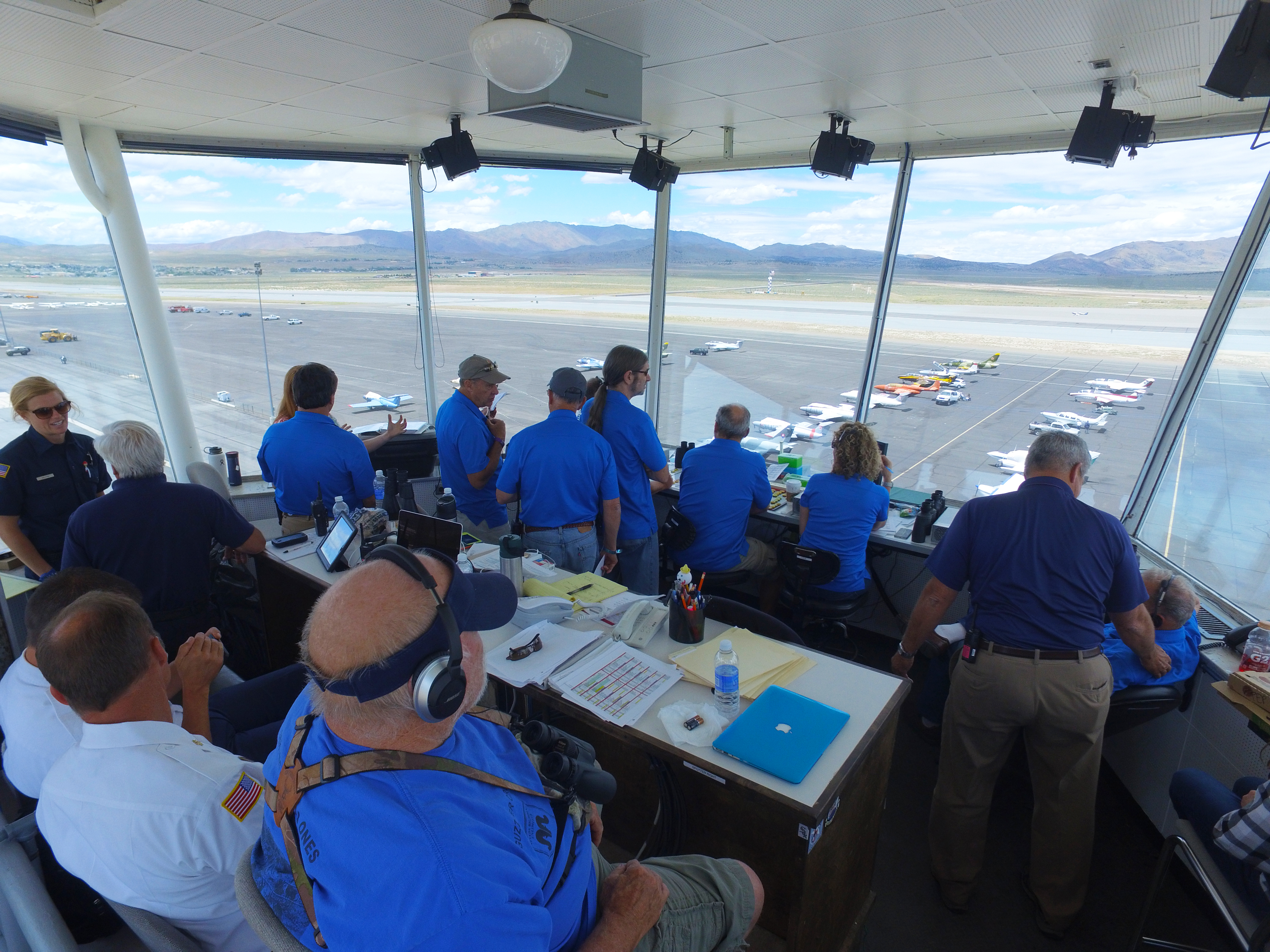
Control Tower during the 2016 National Championship Air Races Pylon Racing Seminar

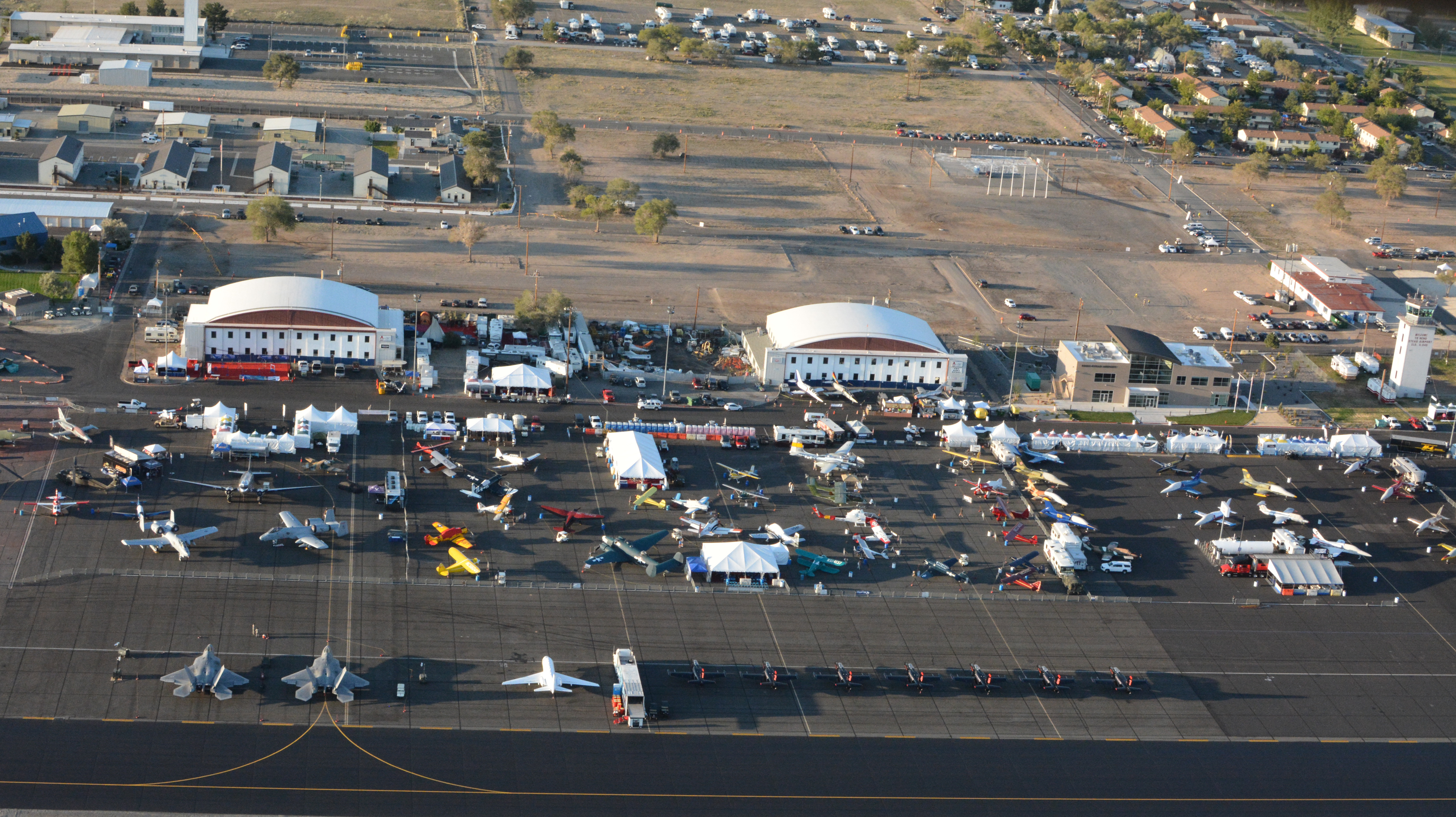
Static aircraft on display at the 2014 Reno Air Races

Beginning in 1964, the Reno Air Races feature multi-lap, multi-aircraft races among extremely high performance aircraft on closed ovoid courses which range between about 3 miles (4.8 km) (Biplanes and Formula One) and about 8 miles (13 km) (Jet, Unlimited) in length per lap. The chief organizer is the Reno Air Racing Association (RARA).

The first Reno air races, in 1964 and 1965, were organized by World War II veteran Bill Stead. They took place at Sky Ranch airfield, a dirt strip barely 2,000 feet (610 m) long, which was located in present-day Spanish Springs. After Stead Air Force Base (20 miles to the west, and named in honor of Bill's brother, Croston Stead) was closed in 1966, that field was turned over for public use, and the races have been held there since then.

Aircraft in the Unlimited class, which consists almost entirely of modified and stock World War II fighters, routinely reach speeds in excess of 400 miles per hour. In 2003, Skip Holm piloted Terry Bland's modified P-51D Mustang, Dago Red, and reached an all-time Unlimited class speed record of 507.105 mph in a six-lap race around the 8 1/2-mile course. The recently added Sport Class racers, mostly homebuilt aircraft, are reaching speeds in excess of 400 mph. In 2009, Curt Brown set a record of 543.568 mph in his jet-engine L-29 Viper.

The Reno Air Races include two and a half days of qualifying, followed by four and a half days of multi-aircraft heat racing, culminating in the Unlimited Class Gold Race on Sunday afternoon. The event also features civil airshow acts and military flight demonstrations between races, plus vendor areas and a large civil and military static aircraft display.

In 2001, the remainder of the event was cancelled because of the grounding of U.S. aviation following the September 11 attacks. The COVID-19 pandemic in 2020 caused the 57th annual race to be cancelled and deferred to 2021.

The 2023 air races were the last race held in Reno. Following a nationwide search to locate a new home, the Reno Air Racing Association moved the location of the 2025 air races to Roswell, New Mexico.

== Classes ==
- Unlimited
- T-6
- Biplane
- Formula One
- Sport
- Jet

== Notable participants ==
=== People ===
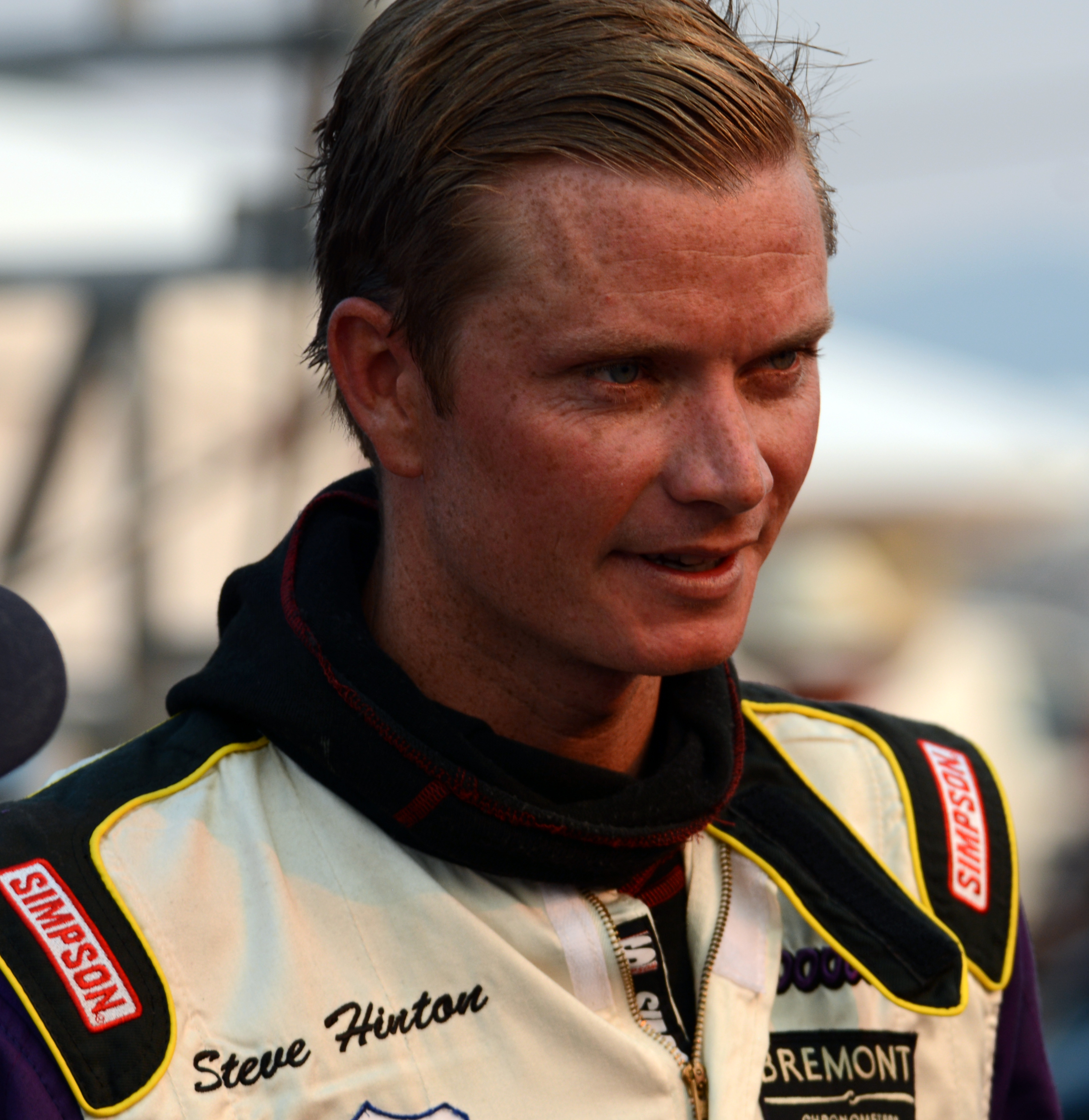
Steven Hinton, Jr., 2014 Reno Air Races champion

- Lee Behel
- Robert Lee "Hoot" Gibson
- Darryl Greenamyer
- Steve Hinton
- Skip Holm
- Bob Hoover
- Gary Hubler
- Rod Lewis
- Clay Lacy

=== Aircraft ===
- September Fury
- Dago Red
- The Galloping Ghost
- Nemesis
- Nemesis NXT
- Precious Metal
- Rare Bear
- Red Baron
- Tsunami
- Voodoo
- Steadfast

== Fatalities ==
=== Before 2011 ===
From 1964 through 2010, 19 aviators lost their lives due to crashes and collisions in the course of the competition and airshow. In 2007, three pilots died over the course of four days in separate incidents: Gary Hubler, Steve Dari, and Brad Morehouse. Racing was suspended for one day after the last of the three incidents.

=== 2011 crash ===
On September 16, 2011, a heavily modified P-51D Mustang named "The Galloping Ghost", piloted by Jimmy Leeward, crashed near the stands during the Gold Heat of the race, killing Leeward and ten spectators, and injuring 69. Race organizers cancelled all remaining 2011 races after the accident.

=== 2014 ===
A custom built race plane named "Sweet Dreams" crashed on the course during qualifying for a Sport Class heat race on September 8, 2014, killing the pilot, Lee Behel.

=== 2022 ===
In the third lap of the Jet Gold final race on September 18, 2022, an L-29 Super Delfin went down on the back section of the course after presumed g-LOC, killing the pilot Aaron Hogue.

=== 2023 ===
On September 17, 2023, two North American T-6 Texans collided following the conclusion of the T-6 Gold race. Both pilots, Nick Macy and Chris Rushing, were killed in the incident. The remaining three races scheduled for Sunday were ultimately cancelled. With the cancellation of the race, it was the final National Championship Air Races in Reno, with the next race planned being the 2025 Roswell Air Races.
