= Gary Hubler =

American aviator (1955–2007)

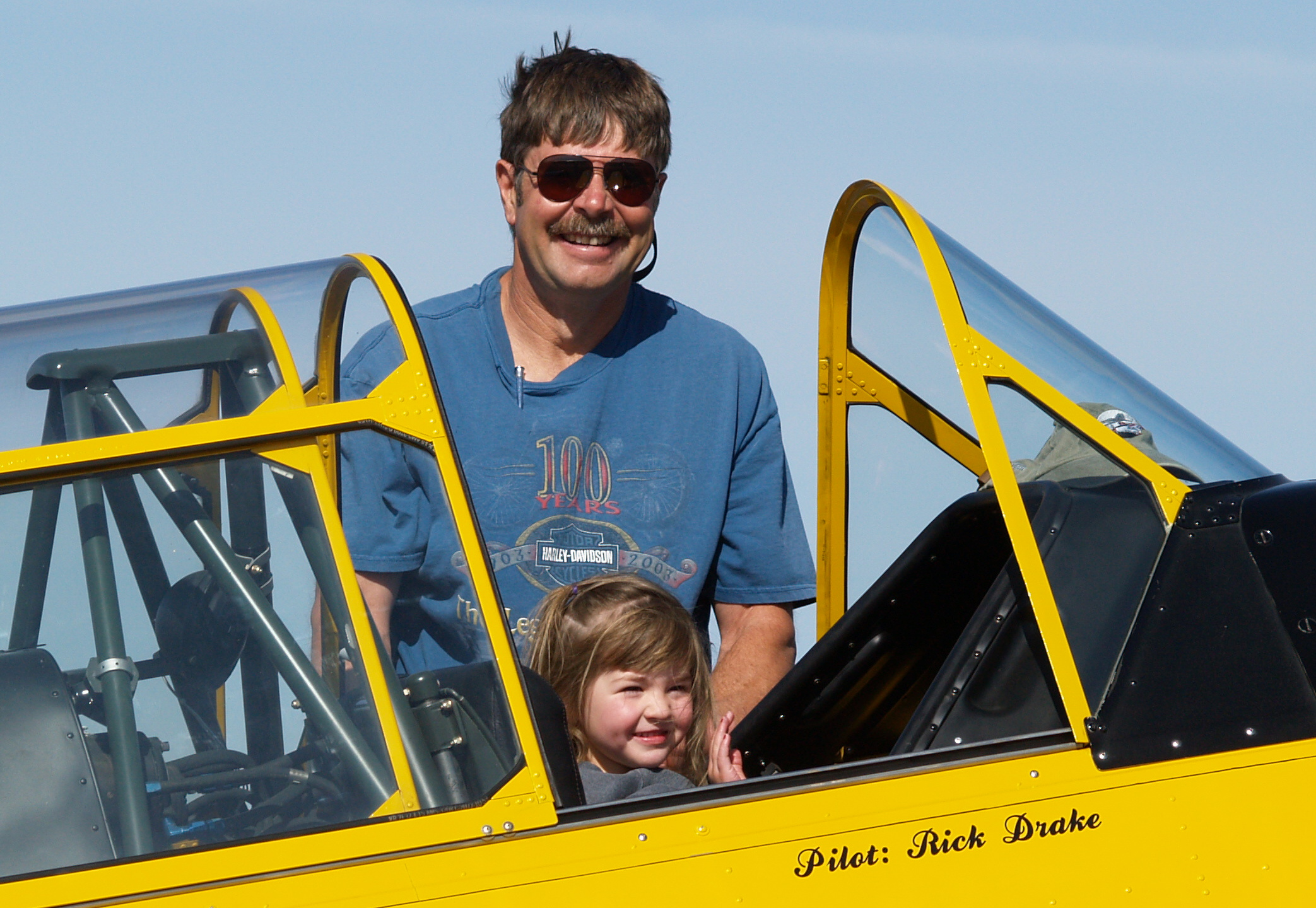
Gary Hubler and his granddaughter during the 2007 Navy Days event at the Warhawk Air Museum in Nampa, Idaho.

Gary Hubler (June 14, 1955 – September 14, 2007) was an American crop duster and commercial transport pilot with over 17,000 flight hours from Caldwell, Idaho. He was notable for being Champion of the Formula 1 class of the Reno Air Races from 2002 through 2006.

Hubler was killed just after 9:30 a.m. on September 14, 2007, when his modified Tuttle Cassutt IIIM aircraft, Mariah, and another aircraft piloted by Jason Somes collided at the 2007 Reno Air Races. The NTSB concluded the probable cause was "the failure of the pilots of both aircraft to maintain an adequate visual lookout and clearance from one another during a low altitude aerial race."
