= Vito Giallo =

American antique dealer and collector (1930–2024)

- Born: June 21, 1930; Brewster, New York, U.S.
- Died: October 22, 2024 (aged 94); New York City, U.S.
- Website: vitogiallo.com

Vito Giallo (June 21, 1930 – October 22, 2024) was an American illustrator, antique dealer, collector, and gallery owner. He was Andy Warhol's first studio assistant during the artist's early career as a commercial illustrator, and he established the Loft Gallery, where Warhol participated in one of his earliest exhibitions. Giallo later became a prominent New York antiques dealer, serving collectors and artists including Mark Rothko, Lee Krasner, and Franz Kline. Since 2022, the Brooklyn-based jewelry brand Catbird has produced limited-edition jewelry collections featuring gemstones from Giallo's collection. He remained actively involved in the collaboration until his death in 2024.

== Early life and education ==
Vito Giallo was born and raised in Brewster, New York. His father, Vito "Brewster Bill" Giallo, was a bootlegger who operated an illicit liquor operation during Prohibition and its aftermath. Giallo later recalled that his father's activities required secrecy, saying, "We had to be very careful on the phone. It was always tapped. We couldn't say where he was. When he was ready to come home, he would always say, 'Put the water on to boil.'" At age 12, Giallo said his father instructed him to deliver several $100 bills, taped to his body, to a relative by train because the FBI was watching the family home. In 1943, his father was convicted as the leader of a bootlegging syndicate that had evaded approximately $3.5 million in federal liquor taxes between 1933 and 1941. He was sentenced to 38 months in prison and fined $10,000. In 1952, he was sentenced to 5 years in prison for operating a still operation, which defrauded the government of an estimated $1 million in taxes from 1949 to 1950.

=== Education ===
After winning a scholarship in an illustration competition, Giallo moved to New York City to study at the Franklin School of Professional Arts in 1949. There he met Ebby Weaver, who became his lifelong partner.

== Career ==
Following graduation, Giallo worked as an illustrator for advertising agencies including Young & Rubicam and J. Walter Thompson.

=== Loft Gallery ===
In 1954, while working for graphic designer Jack Wolfgang Beck, Giallo proposed converting unused studio space into an exhibition venue known as the Loft Gallery. A friend, Nathan Gluck, introduced Giallo to the young commercial artist Andy Warhol, who contributed a collection of origami works to one of the gallery's inaugural group exhibitions.

=== Assistant to Andy Warhol ===
Within a year of meeting, Warhol hired Giallo as his first paid studio assistant. Working from Warhol's East 34th Street apartment, Giallo assisted in producing Warhol's commercial illustrations using the artist's signature blotted-line technique. Warhol's mother, Julia Warhola, also participated in the production of many illustrations by adding calligraphy.

Giallo lived nearby, in a two-bedroom apartment he shared with Weaver, which they rented from Bert Carpenter, an art professor at Columbia University, for $85 a month.

In the evenings, Giallo and Warhol socialized around New York, although their interests differed. Warhol enjoyed attending parties and attracted attention from people eager to meet him, but Giallo later recalled that they were often disappointed by his quiet demeanor, noting that he "hardly ever talked." Giallo instead preferred attending jazz performances, including shows by artists such as Ella Fitzgerald, Billie Holiday, Ray Charles, and Miles Davis.

Giallo worked for Warhol until 1957, when the two parted after a disagreement, and he was succeeded by Gluck.

=== Antiques career ===
In 1961, Giallo opened his first antiques shop on Third Avenue in Manhattan. His clientele included artists associated with Abstract Expressionism, among them Mark Rothko, Lee Krasner, and Franz Kline. During the 1970s he relocated his business to 966 Madison Avenue, where he became known for sourcing European furniture, decorative arts, gemstones, and architectural objects.

Giallo later reconciled with Warhol, who became a regular customer. Warhol was fascinated by his shop's Madison Avenue location, saying, "Wow, you must be on Easy Street," and visited nearly every day during the final eight years of his life. Near the end of Warhol's life, Giallo told Warhol about his collection of gemstones and offered to sell some for the artist's planned venture into jewelry design. Warhol selected an entire box containing approximately 35 to 40 stones, but died from complications following gallbladder surgery in 1987 before he could use them. They were later sold as part of Warhol's estate sale at Sotheby's in 1988. Giallo contributed to the auction catalog, writing "For Andy, starting a new day meant buying something. On most mornings around 11 o'clock he would arrive at my shop, much to the delight of my customers, with several Interviews (Warhol's magazine) under his arm, ready to pass them out and autograph them. Andy's mania for collecting was an extension of his painting. He would buy rows and rows of mercury glass vases, copper luster pitchers, Victorian card cases. One couldn't help being reminded of his paintings of multiple images."

In July 1993, Giallo closed his shop to concentrate on his antiques rental business, supplying furniture, decorative objects, and other items for film productions and photography shoots.

=== Catbird x Vito's Gems collection ===
During the COVID-19 pandemic, Giallo began collaborating with the Brooklyn-based jewelry company Catbird after showing gemstones from his collection to Tara Marrale, his great-grandniece by marriage, who lived upstairs. Marrale suggested that the stones could be used in a jewelry collaboration, leading her to contact Catbird. In 2022, the company released the first Catbird x Vito's Gems collection, followed by additional limited-edition collections featuring Giallo's gemstones. Despite being in his early 90s at the time of the collaboration, Giallo remained involved in the project, creating sculptures for promotional photographs and overseeing the use and sale of the stones.

== Collection ==
Giallo assembled an eclectic collection of fine art, antiques, furniture, natural history specimens, and decorative objects over more than six decades. His Brooklyn apartment became known for its densely layered interiors, combining artworks with European antiques and objects acquired throughout his career. Giallo and Weaver, an interior designer, frequently traveled to estate sales and antique markets outside New York City in search of objects. He also collected artworks by artists including Warhol, Henri Matisse, and Pablo Picasso alongside 18th-century Italian paintings.

== Death ==
Giallo died at the age of 94 on October 22, 2024.

== In pop culture ==
Giallo appeared in the documentary series Andy Warhol: The Complete Picture (2001). He also contributed original illustrations to Andy Warhol's New York City: Four Walks Uptown to Downtown (2010) by Thomas Kiedrowski.
