= Skip Holm =

American retired pilot

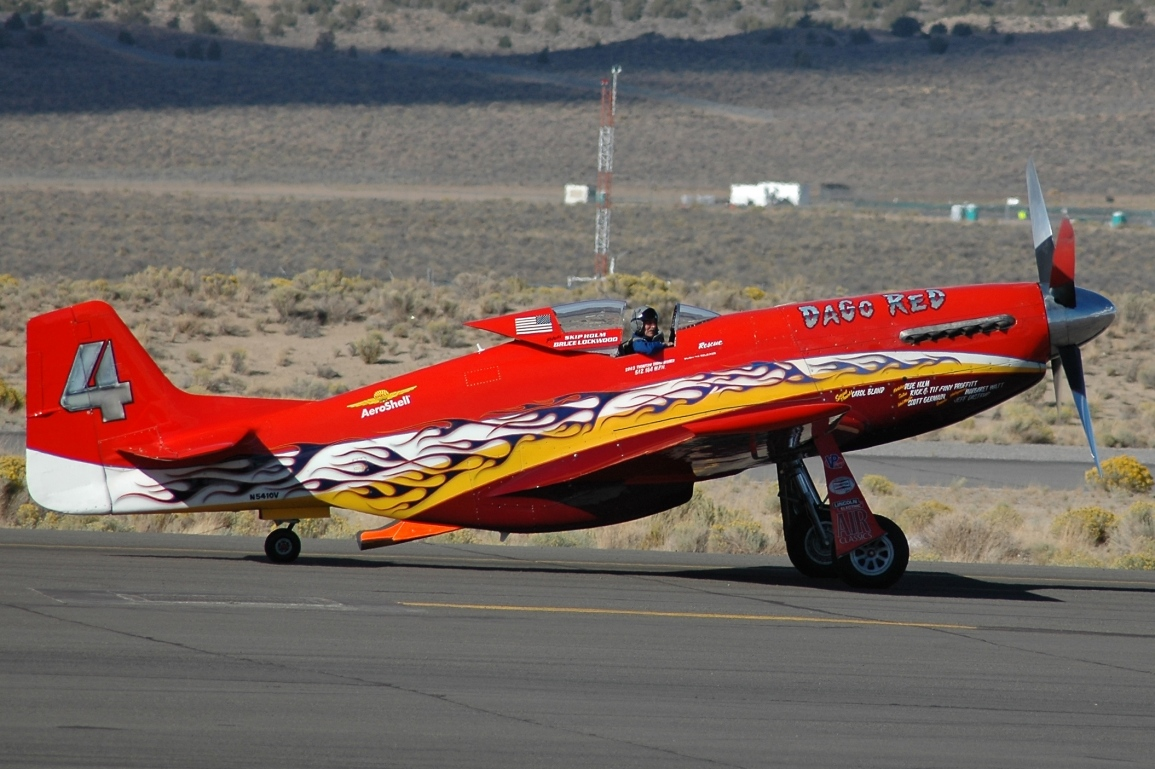
P-51D Dago Red piloted by Holm at the 2004 Reno Air Races

Skip James Holm (born February 22, 1944) is a retired pilot who lives in Calabasas, California, USA.

Holm claims to hold the world record for combat flight hours: 1,172. He retired from the U.S. Air Force Reserve in 1992, with the rank of lieutenant colonel. He logged his combat hours flying F-105s and F-4s in the Vietnam War. After three tours of duty in Vietnam, he joined Lockheed Skunk Works and test piloted the experimental and production F-117s.

Holm participated in the Reno Air Races since 1981. He has won in the Unlimited class of piston-engined aircraft in 1984, 2000, 2002 and 2003. Holm performed as stand-in pilot in The Right Stuff and Hot Shots!

== Personal life ==
Holm was married to actress P. J. Soles from 1983 to 1998. They have a son named Sky (born in 1983) and a daughter named Ashley (born in 1988).

== Books ==
- Robert Gandt, Fly Low Fly Fast: Inside the Reno Air Races (1999)
