= Anderson Kingfisher =

Kingfisher

General information
- Type: Amphibian utility aircraft
- National origin: United States
- Manufacturer: Anderson Aircraft Company
- Designer: Earl W Anderson

History
- First flight: 24 April 1969

The Anderson EA-1 Kingfisher is a US two-seat amphibious aircraft designed and marketed for homebuilding. It was the work of Earl William Anderson, a Pan Am airline captain, who flew the prototype on 24 April 1969. By 1978, 200 sets of kits for the plane had been sold, and 100 Kingfishers were reported to be under construction. The aircraft is a shoulder-wing monoplane with a flying boat hull and outrigger pontoons. On land, it uses retractable tailwheel undercarriage. The single engine with a tractor propeller is mounted in a nacelle above the wing. Some builders utilize the wings from a Piper Cub rather than making their own.

The planes were later marketed by Richard Warner Aviation before becoming the Wings Unlimited Kingfisher in the late 1990s. A variant with improved performance is known as the 'Super Kingfisher'.

== Specifications (original configuration) ==
Data from Jane's All the World's Aircraft 1982–83

General characteristics

- Crew: 1
- Capacity: 1 passenger
- Length: 23 ft 6 in (7.16 m)
- Wingspan: 36 ft 1 in (11.00 m)
- Height: 8 ft 0 in (2.44 m)
- Empty weight: 1,032 lb (468 kg)
- Max takeoff weight: 1,600 lb (726 kg)
- Fuel capacity: 20 US gal (17 imp gal; 76 L)
- Powerplant: 1 × Lycoming O-235 four-cylinder horizontally-opposed engine, 115 hp (86 kW)
- Propellers: 2-bladed fixed pitch, 6 ft 0 in (1.83 m) diameter

Performance

- Maximum speed: 120 mph (190 km/h, 100 kn)
- Cruise speed: 85 mph (137 km/h, 74 kn) at 1,000 ft (300 m)
- Stall speed: 45 mph (72 km/h, 39 kn)
- Range: 200 mi (320 km, 170 nmi) with maximum fuel
- Service ceiling: 10,000 ft (3,000 m)
- Rate of climb: 500–600 ft/min (2.5–3.0 m/s)
- Takeoff run to 50 ft (m): 1,000 ft (300 m)

== See also ==
Aircraft of comparable role, configuration, and era

- Taylor Coot
