= USS Osprey =

USS Osprey has been the name of various United States Navy ships, and may refer to:

- USS Osprey (AM-29), a minesweeper in commission from 1919 to 1920
- USS Osprey (AM-56), a minesweeper commissioned in 1940 and sunk in 1944
- USS Osprey (AM-406), a minesweeper cancelled in 1945
- USS Osprey (AMS-28), originally USS YMS–422, a minesweeper commissioned in 1944, renamed Osprey in 1947, and transferred to the Japanese Maritime Self Defense Force in 1955
- USS Osprey (MHC-51), a coastal minehunter in commission from 1993 to 2006

== See also ==
- USS Osprey II (SP-928), a U.S. Navy patrol boat in commission from 1917 to 1918
- USFS Osprey, a U.S. Bureau of Fisheries fishery patrol vessel in commission from 1913 to 1921
