= Catbird (jeweler) =

American jeweler

Catbird is an American jeweler founded in 2004 in Brooklyn, New York. It has influenced several trends in jewelry fashion. The brand is notable for its success among Millennials and Gen-Zers.

== History ==
The brand was founded in 2004 by Rony Vardi in Williamsburg. According to Women's Wear Daily it was "among the first fine jewelers to sell online". In 2015, Le Bon Marché featured it in a Brooklyn-themed popup. By 2024, it had storefronts in Los Angeles, Boston, Washington DC's Georgetown neighborhood, with three in New York City.

== Designs ==
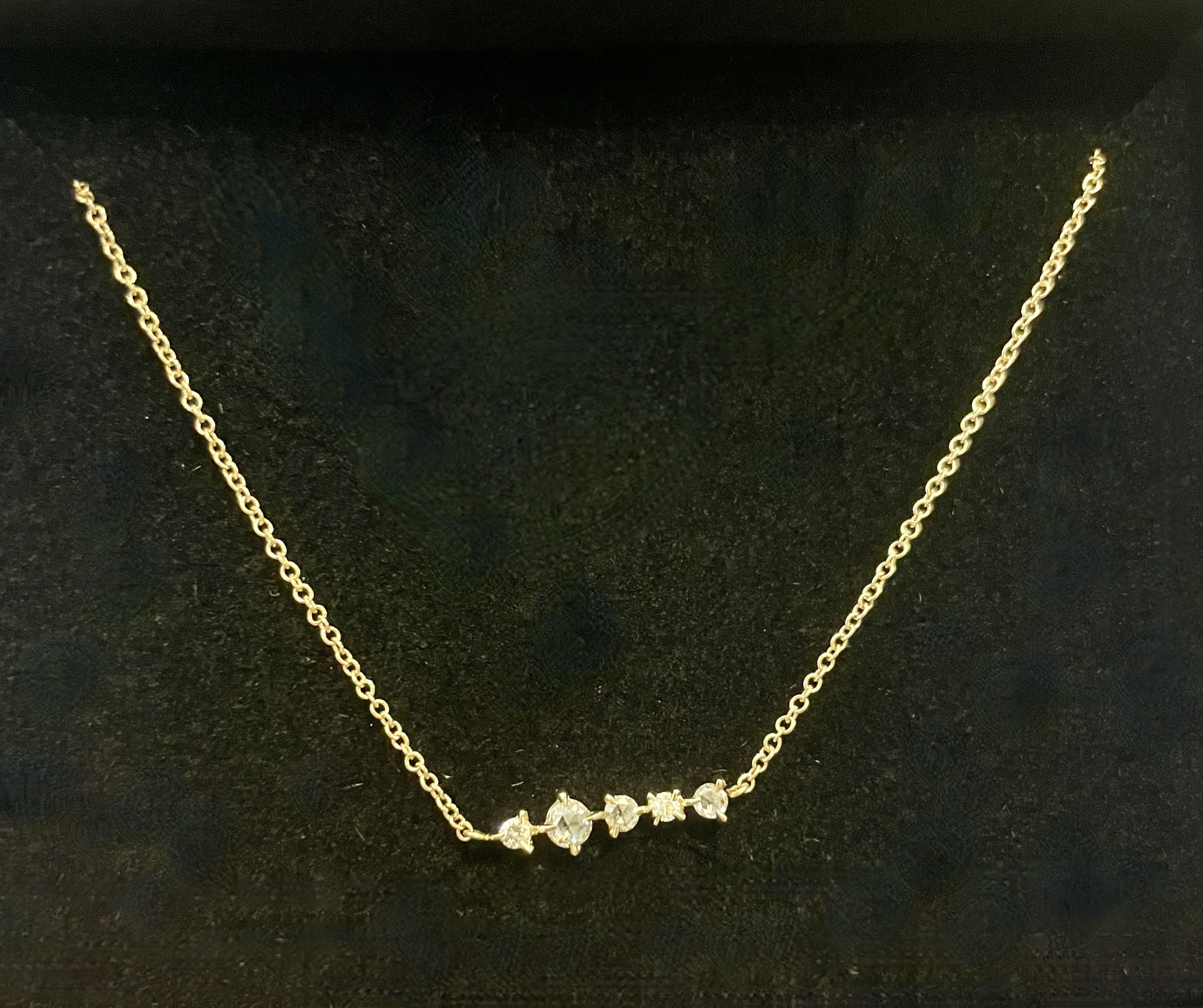
Necklace design

The brand's designs are small, delicate, and dainty. They include bracelets, necklaces, rings, charms, and earrings often intended to be stacked and layered with each other. The New York Times called it "demi-fine" to distinguish it from costume jewelry and fine jewelry.

The shops have offered permanently welded-in-place custom bracelets since 2017. Permanent jewelry went viral in the early 2020s.

The brand focuses on sustainable sourcing and avoiding conflict resources, using recycled diamonds and gold for most designs.

=== Collaborations ===
The brand has collaborated with Phoebe Bridgers, Jenny Slate, Leith Clark, Sofia Coppola, Boygenius, Laufey, and the Metropolitan Museum of Art. Catbird has a longstanding collaboration with former antique dealer Vito Giallo.

== Popularity and influence ==
According to the Washington Post, the brand has "been at the forefront of a number of jewelry trends over the past two decades, including a move to smaller, more delicate jewelry" rather than the larger, heavier pieces which had been popular in previous decades. Refinery 29 said the brand deserves much of the credit for the fashion trend of layering multiple delicate rings, bracelets, and necklaces. Women's Wear Daily credited it with creating a "fresh way" to stack rings. Glamour said it had "almost single-handedly popularized stacking and knuckle rings". Catbird may have contributed to the recent popularity of wearing rings on middle knuckles, sometimes called a knuckle ring or a midi ring.

The brand is liked by some famous Millennials and Gen-Zers. Taylor Swift and Meghan Markle have worn pieces, and Phoebe Bridgers has said she wears no other jewelry.
