= Lockheed Martin CATBird =

American avionics flight testbed aircraft

CATBird
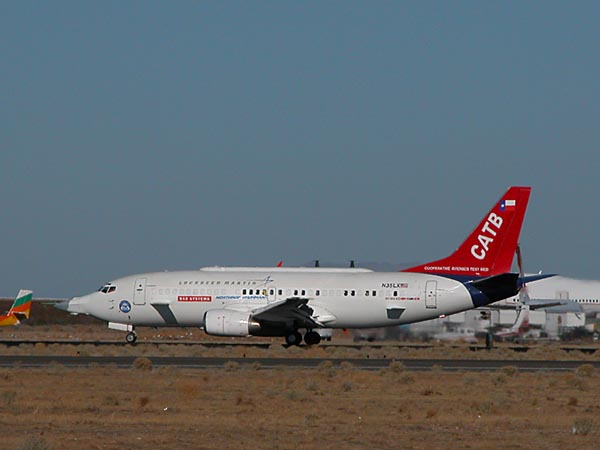
- Lockheed CATBird taxiing at the Mojave Spaceport during engine tests

General information
- Type: Testbed
- Manufacturer: Boeing Commercial Airplanes
- Status: Systems test aircraft

History
- First flight: 23 January 2007
- Developed from: Boeing 737-330

The Lockheed Martin CATBird is a highly modified Boeing 737-330 designed as an avionics flight testbed aircraft. The name is an adaptive acronym, from Cooperative Avionics Test Bed; CATBIRD is Lockheed's ICAO-designated company callsign. The aircraft was modified in order to provide an economic means of developing and flight testing the avionics suite for the Lockheed Martin F-35 Lightning II. CATBird has a distinctive appearance, with an F-35's nose and a pair of small canards located just aft of the forward entrance doors. Inside, the aircraft is equipped with racks to hold all of F-35's avionics, as well as an F-35 cockpit.

The aircraft was modified under contract by BAE Systems Inc. at their facility at the Mojave Spaceport. Work began in December, 2003, and the aircraft began post-modification taxi tests in November 2006. First flight took place on January 23, 2007 at Mojave. After the initial flight test program conducted at Mojave, on March 2, 2007, the aircraft was ferried to Lockheed's Fort Worth facility for Phase 2 of the modification program, which would install the flight test stations and actual avionics and sensor systems to be tested.

In 2014 the CATBird's software test station was upgraded by Northrop Grumman with Tech Refresh 2 hardware which gives the CATBird capability to test F-35 Block 3 Software.

== See also ==
Related development

- Boeing 737
- Boeing 737 Classic
- Boeing T-43
