= Osprey Osprey I =

Flying boat

GP2 Osprey I
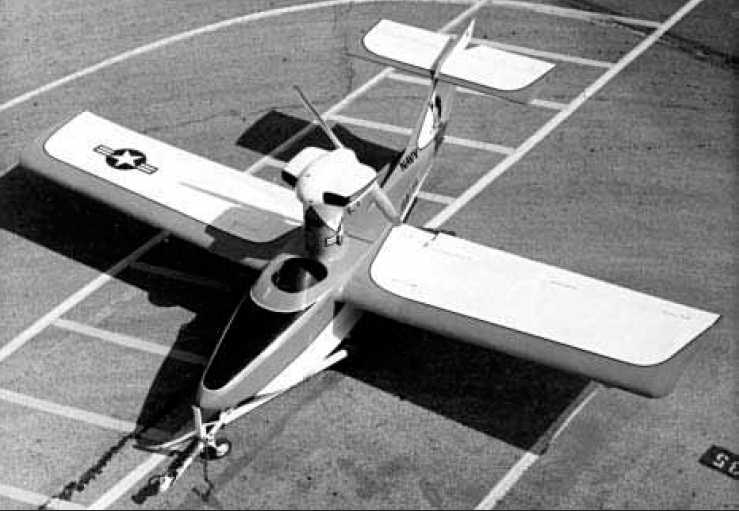
- X-28

General information
- Type: Sport flying boat
- National origin: United States
- Manufacturer: Homebuilt
- Designer: Eut Tileston

History
- First flight: 12 August 1970

The Osprey GP2 Osprey, also known as the Air Skimmer, Sea Skimmer, or Pereira GP2 Osprey, was a single-seat flying boat designed by Eut Tileston under contract to George Pereira, a private builder. After the release of Pereira's amphibious Osprey II some years later, this aircraft became known retrospectively as the Osprey I. The original plane was designed to be water launched only. Initial test flights were performed in the Sacramento Delta. A single example was evaluated by the United States Navy as the X-28. Pereira formed Osprey Aircraft to market the plans to homebuilders, including plans for a trailer that allows the pilot to launch and recover the aircraft single-handed. These plans are still marketed by Osprey Aircraft as of March 2017.

The Navy became interested in the project through a Naval Air Development Center study into patrol missions in Southeast Asia. The study required that the aircraft be capable of flight under visual flight rules (VFR), be lightweight, cost less than 5,000 US dollars, and be able to be manufactured in Southeast Asia. After examining Pereira's Osprey in 1971, the Navy purchased the aircraft and commenced testing it as the X-28A in the fall of that year. Although the Osprey met most of the requirements of the program, the program itself was cancelled without any further military examples produced. The sole X-28 is now on display in the Mid-America Air Museum.

== Specifications Osprey I ==
Data from

General characteristics

- Crew: 1 Pilot
- Length: 17 ft 3 in (5.26 m)
- Wingspan: 23 ft (7.0 m)
- Height: 5 ft 3 in (1.60 m)
- Wing area: 97 sq ft (9.0 m^{2})
- Empty weight: 600 lb (272 kg)
- Gross weight: 900 lb (408 kg)
- Max takeoff weight: 1,560 lb (708 kg)
- Powerplant: 1 × Continental C90 , 90 hp (67 kW)

Performance

- Cruise speed: 103 kn (118 mph, 190 km/h)
- Minimum control speed: 48 kn (55 mph, 89 km/h)
- Rate of climb: 2,200 ft/min (11 m/s)
- Wing loading: 9.3 lb/sq ft (45 kg/m^{2})

== See also ==
Related development

- Osprey Osprey 2

Related lists

- List of experimental aircraft
