= Osprey Osprey 2 =

American amateur-built aircraft

Osprey 2
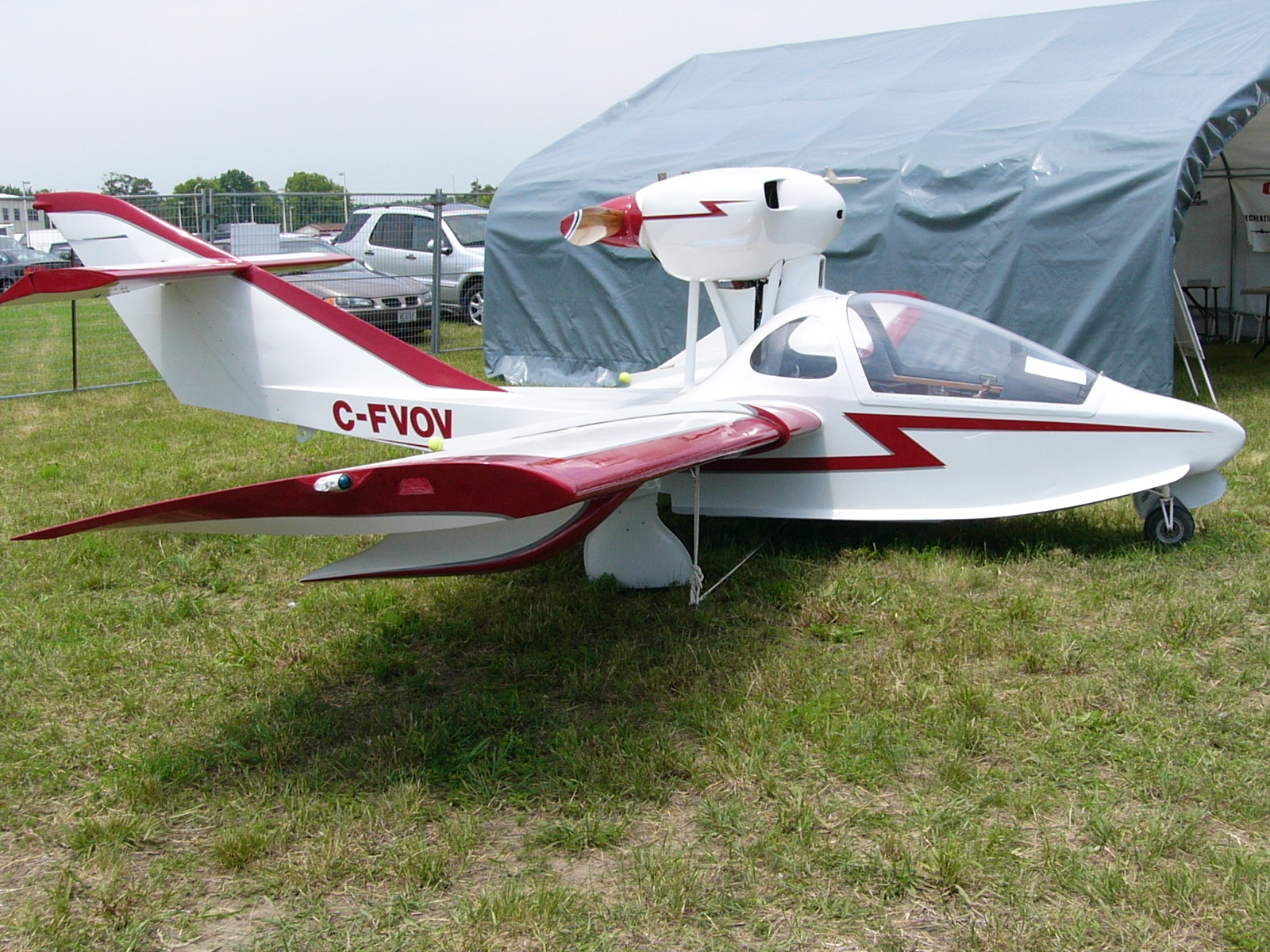

General information
- Type: Sport amphibian
- National origin: United States
- Manufacturer: Homebuilt
- Designer: George Pereira
- Status: Plans available (2015)
- Number built: 500+ (2009)

History
- First flight: April 1973

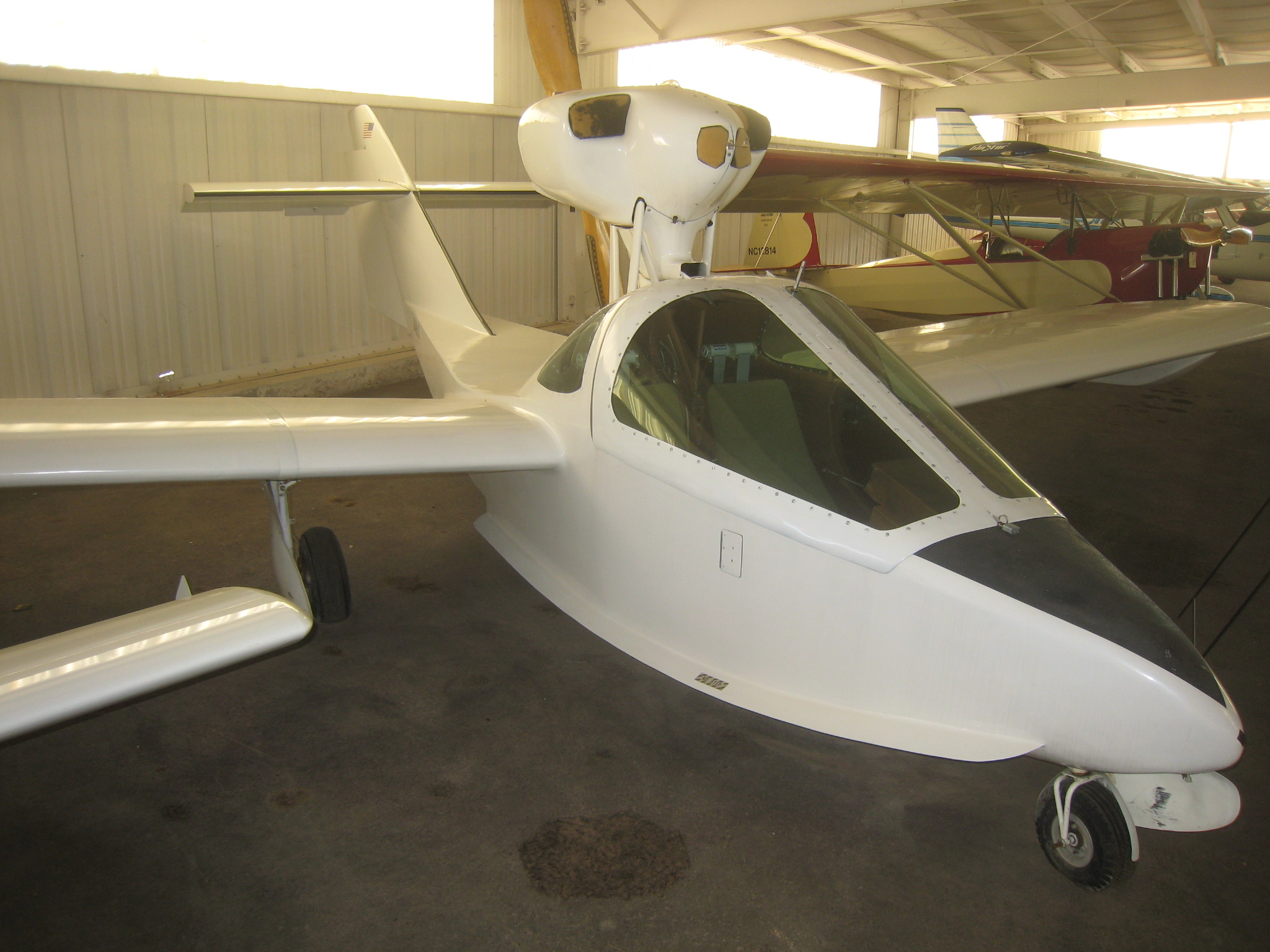
Osprey II

The Osprey Osprey 2, also known as the Pereira Osprey 2 after its designer, is an amphibious sport aircraft designed for homebuilding. Plans have been sold since the mid-1970s. George Pereira designed the Osprey 2 to address the two most frequent criticisms of his Osprey I aircraft: its lack of a passenger seat and its inability to operate from dry land. An exercise that began as a series of modifications to the original design in January 1972 eventually turned into a complete redesign of the aircraft, with the resulting Osprey 2 flying in April 1973.

== Design and development ==
Like the original Osprey, the Osprey 2 is a mid-wing cantilever monoplane with a flying boat hull and a single engine mounted pusher-fashion in a nacelle mounted above the fuselage on struts. A passenger seat is provided side-by-side with the pilot and the cabin is fully enclosed. Retractable tricycle undercarriage is provided for land operations, the main units of which fold into the undersides of the wings. Construction throughout is of wood and skinned in plywood. Some of the hull contours are formed with polyurethane foam covered in fiberglass.

The aircraft is designed so that it may be constructed by amateur builders with restricted space available – Pereira's prototype was built in a workspace 16 ft × 26 ft (4.8 m × 7.9 m) and took 1,300 hours to complete. To simplify construction, no molds are required, and even the canopy is formed by a simple bend in an acrylic sheet without any compound curves.

Osprey markets the aircraft as sets of plans rather than kits, and had sold over 1,000 copies by 1985. Over 500 examples have been completed and flown.

== Aircraft on display ==
- EAA AirVenture Museum
- Pima Air & Space Museum
- Aerospace Museum of California

== Specifications ==
Data from jane's All the World's Aircraft 1985–86, p.606

General characteristics

- Crew: One pilot
- Capacity: 1 passenger
- Length: 20 ft 6 in (6.25 m)
- Wingspan: 26 ft 0 in (7.92 m)
- Height: 6 ft 0 in (1.83 m)
- Wing area: 130 sq ft (12.0 m^{2})
- Empty weight: 970 lb (440 kg)
- Gross weight: 1,560 lb (707 kg)
- Powerplant: 1 × Lycoming O-320 , 150 hp (112 kW)

Performance

- Cruise speed: 130 mph (209 km/h, 110 kn)
- Range: 500 mi (800 km, 430 nmi)
- Rate of climb: 1,000 ft/min (5.1 m/s)

== See also ==
Aircraft of comparable role, configuration, and era

- ICON A5
- Larkin Skylark
- Progressive Aerodyne SeaRey
- Volmer VJ-22 Sportsman

Related lists

- List of flying boats and floatplanes
