= Sweet Dreams (aircraft) =

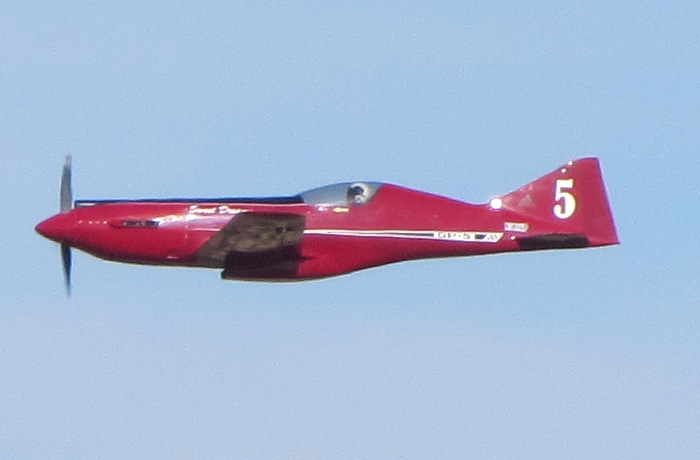

General information
- Other name: Osprey GP-5
- Type: Unlimited/Sport/Super-Sport/Sport-Gold class racing aircraft
- Manufacturer: George Pereira, Gary Childs and George Backovich
- Registration: N501GP

History
- First flight: 2007
- Last flight: 8 September 2014
- Fate: Crashed, killing pilot Lee Behel, due to structural failure of a wing

The GP-5 Sweet Dreams was a Super Sport Class racing airplane designed by George Pereira, owner of Osprey Aircraft. It was originally built by Gary Childs, who sold it to another builder, who in turn sold it to George Backovich. Backovich enlisted the help of designer Pereira to complete it in 2007, after changes to its automotive engine conversion, and switching the propeller manufacturer.

The aircraft was specifically built to race in the Unlimited class at the Reno Air Races. Changes to the Unlimited class rules made the GP-5 no longer eligible for that class, so it was entered in the Sport class instead. Further rule changes excluded the GP-5 from competing in that class until the Super Sport class emerged. The Super Sport class was merged with the Sport class becoming, effectively, an Unlimited class for aircraft with engines less than 1,000 cu in (16.39 L) displacement.

Sweet Dreams was entered in the Reno 2010 Sport class, but engine failure during practice runs resulted in the need to find a better engine/propeller/gearbox combination. Eventually the GP-5 competed in the 2012 Sport-Gold class at Reno finishing fourth.

On 8 September 2014, during a qualifying heat at the 2014 Reno Air Races, pilot Lee Behel was killed when Sweet Dreams crashed due to an inflight wing failure.

== Specifications (GP-5) ==
General characteristics

- Crew: 1
- Powerplant: 1 × Hasselgren_Engineering,_Inc SBC , 625 hp (466 kW)

Performance

- Maximum speed: 315 kn (363 mph, 584 km/h)
