= Patrol Air Cushion Vehicle =

Hovercraft

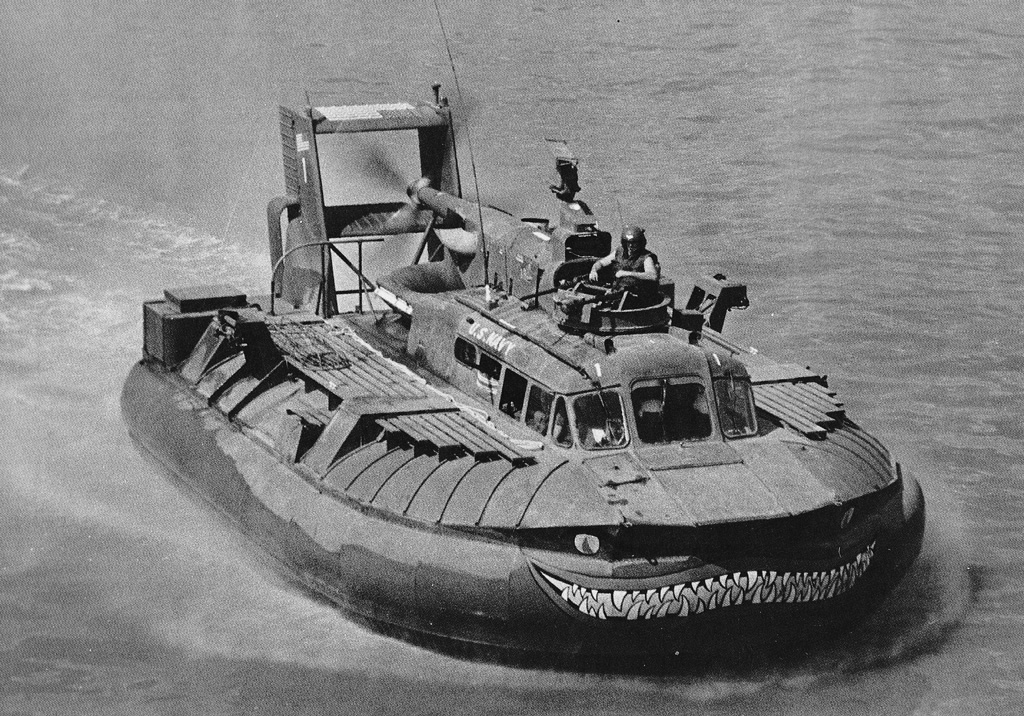
- A Navy PACV in Vietnam

Class overview
- Name: PACV
- Builders: British Hovercraft Corporation, Bell Aerosystems
- Operators: US Navy; US Army; US Coast Guard
- Cost: $1 million
- Built: 1965
- In commission: 1966–1970
- Completed: 6
- Lost: 3 (Note: Two Army ACVs were lost in combat in Vietnam and one Coast Guard ACV sank in an accident)

General characteristics
- Type: Hovercraft
- Tonnage: 15,660 pounds (7.10 tonnes)
- Length: 38 feet 10 inches (11.84 m)
- Beam: 23 feet 9 inches (7.24 m)
- Height: 16.5 feet (5.0 m) on cushion
- Installed power: 900 horsepower (670 kW) (Navy PACV), 1,100 horsepower (820 kW) (Army ACV)
- Propulsion: GE 7LM100-PJ102 gas turbine
- Speed: 60 knots (110 km/h; 69 mph); 70 knots (130 km/h; 81 mph) in Coast Guard service
- Range: 165 nautical miles (306 km; 190 mi); 300 nautical miles (560 km; 350 mi) in Coast Guard service
- Endurance: 7 hours
- Troops: 12
- Crew: 4
- Sensors & processing systems: Decca 202 radar; XM-3 people sniffer
- Armament: twin .50 cal M2 machine gun, 2x 7.62 mm M60 machine guns (Note: Some PACVs were also armed with a 40 mm Mk 18 or M5 automatic grenade launcher and/or a 7.62 mm minigun)
- Armor: None (PACV); 1,000 lbs. armor around crew cabin, engine, and fuel tanks (ACV only)

The Patrol Air Cushion Vehicle (PACV), also known as the Air Cushion Vehicle (ACV) in Army and Coast Guard service, was a United States Navy and Army hovercraft used as a patrol boat in marshy and riverine areas during the Vietnam War between 1966 and 1970. Six hovercraft were built, three for the Army and three for the Navy.

The military developed the PACV because its lack of draft meant that it could operate unimpeded in the shallow and reed-choked waters widespread in South Vietnam, most notably in the Mekong Delta and Plain of Reeds. The PACV was also found to be valuable because of its unusually high speed of 60 knots (110 km/h; 69 mph), faster than other watercraft in the conflict. However, it faced major drawbacks, including its high cost of $1 million (equivalent to 13 Patrol Boat, Rivers) and unreliability. During the conflict, two of the Army's three hovercraft were destroyed by the Viet Cong. The PACVs in Vietnam were considered "unsuccessful" in evaluations and were withdrawn in 1970. Following their service in Vietnam, the Navy PACVs returned to the United States where they were used by the Coast Guard, where another sank in an accident.

== Development ==
The PACV was based on the Bell Aerosystems SK-5 hovercraft; a licensed version of the British Saunders-Roe (later, British Hovercraft Corporation) SR.N5 hovercraft. The SK-5 was adapted for American military use in 1965. Three were purchased by the US Navy for operations in the emerging Vietnam War. Training of PACV crews was performed in the waters off Coronado, California near San Diego. Design of the Army ACVs began in 1966 and was completed

== Design ==
Two different designs were made: one for the Navy and one for the Army. The Navy's hovercraft, called Patrol Air Cushion Vehicles, more closely resembled the civilian SK-5s that they were based on while the Army craft had more extensive modifications. Each hovercraft was 38 ft 10 in (11.84 m) long, with a beam of 23 ft 9 in (7.24 m) and a height of 16 ft 6 in (5.03 m) when floating on its air cushion. It weighed 15,660 pounds (7.10 tonnes) fully loaded. Army and Navy PACVs had a crew of 4—driver, radar operator, and gunners—and could carry up to 12 troops, many of whom rode on the outside of the vehicle.

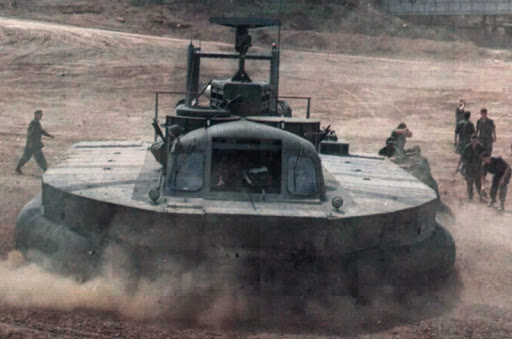
Army ACV 903 undergoing pre-deployment testing shortly after being built

Both designs were powered by a General Electric 7LM100-PJ102 gas turbine engine. The engine, its 304-gallon (1,150 litre) fuel tank, an auxiliary power unit, and the Westland transmission were located amidships. The engine powered both the three-blade variable-pitch propeller for thrust and the 7-foot (2.1 m) diameter centrifugal fan for lift. The transmission served to link the engine and lift fan so that the fan could provide lift and thrust. Twin rudders and elevators sat behind the fans. As a hovercraft, the PACV could skim over water, including shallow and reed-choked waters, flat land, and ice. The PACV/ACV was very fast compared to contemporary watercraft, being capable of speeds up to 60 knots (110 km/h; 69 mph). It had a range of 165 nautical miles (306 km; 190 mi) and endurance of seven hours

The Army hovercraft, called Air Cushion Vehicles, had more extensive modifications. They had heavier armor and reinforced, load-bearing decks. Army ACVs carried 1,000 pounds (450 kg) of armor—roughly equal to that of an M113 armored personnel carrier. The armor was thickest around the engine, transmission, and fuel tanks, providing protection from .50 caliber rounds fired at 200 yards (180 m), while the armor around the crew compartment could only block .30 caliber rounds fired at 100 yards (91 m). To save weight, many crews removed the armor around the crew compartment, and an Army evaluation recommended that it be removed altogether because of it "did not provide any protection to the crew," especially against heavier weapons such as recoilless rifles, artillery, and RPGs.

The communications package consisted of a six-station intercom system, UHF radios, and a radio security set. The boats were shipped with AN/ARC-54 FM radios. However, these proved unreliable, with an operational ready rate of only 35 percent. Army units sought to replace them with VRC-125s. While it is not known if this replacement occurred, one ACV did receive a VRC-46 radio. The hovercraft carried a Decca 202 radar with a dish antenna, which could detect targets within 24 miles (39 km). Some Army ACVs were fitted with XM3 Personnel Detectors (better known as XM-3 "people sniffers"), which could detect human emissions including carbon and ammonia. This equipment was used to find hidden enemies. Dog teams were also sometimes carried to help detect enemies. The radar was found to be very effective, including for navigating in low-visibility and foggy conditions.

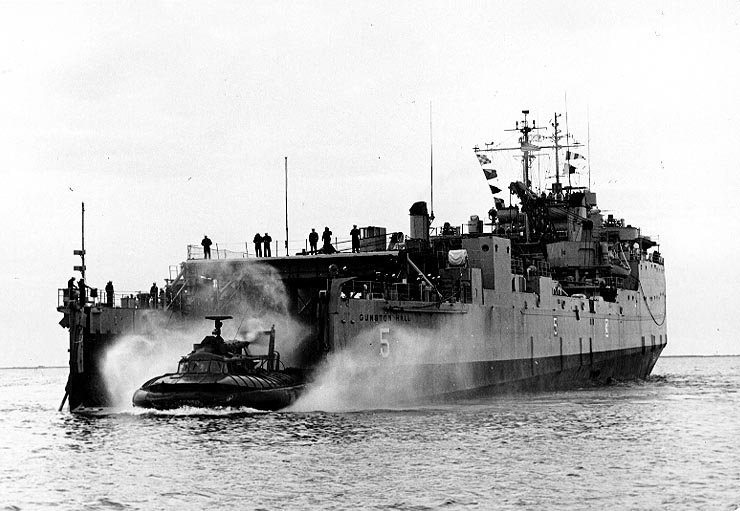
Dock Landing Ship USS Gunston Hall launches a PACV in 1967

The PACV was armed with twin .50 caliber M2 Browning machine guns in a roof-mounted turret in the front and two 7.62mm M60 machine guns, one port and one starboard. The Army initially equipped their hovercraft with a minigun and 40 mm M5 automatic grenade launcher as well. Only one ACV was outfitted with a grenade launcher, however, and the miniguns were removed to make space for more troops and cargo because it was found to be effective only for suppressive fire.

The Army ACVs had other improvements over the Navy PACVs beyond their additional armor, namely a wider cockpit, more horsepower, two gun positions instead of one, and a flat deck on top of the skirt for troops to ride on.

== Operational history ==
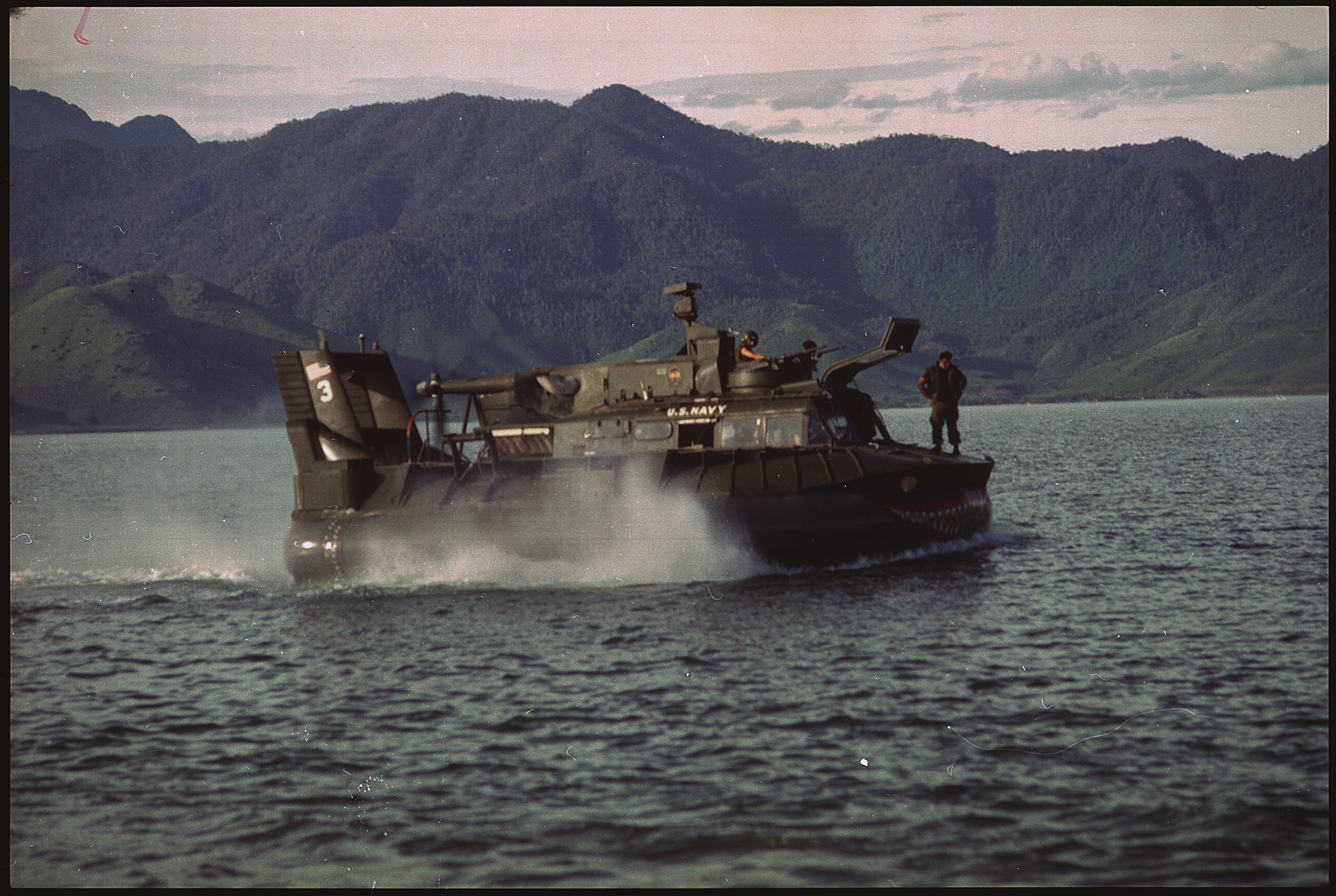
A PACV in Cau Hai Bay near Hue in 1968

PACVs were first deployed to Vietnam in May 1966 as PACV Division 107, Task Force 116, where they were used by the Navy for riverine patrol missions in the Mekong Delta and on the Mekong River. Often called "Pac Vees", they were armed with a .50 caliber machine gun mounted on a rotating platform in the front and two side-mounted M60 machine guns. In addition, the crew, and often US Army Special Forces and ARVN Rangers, riding on the side panels, employed assorted small arms such as M16 rifles and M79 grenade launchers as well as various other rifles, .45 pistols, light and medium machine guns, and grenades, although using small arms was dangerous because spent casings could fall into the propeller. The PACV was used to prevent Viet Cong infiltration from the sea and tidal areas along river mouths and deltas. It was especially useful in shallow marshy areas, especially the Mekong Delta, where other patrol boats such as the Patrol Boat, River or Patrol Craft Fast (Swift boat) could not go.

The PACV's relatively light weight of only seven tonnes meant that it could be easily carried by a CH-54 helicopter. This allowed it to be airlifted between forward operating bases or transported back to base when it suffered damage. The PACV could also be split into sections and then transported in Air Force transport planes, which was how they were brought to Vietnam.

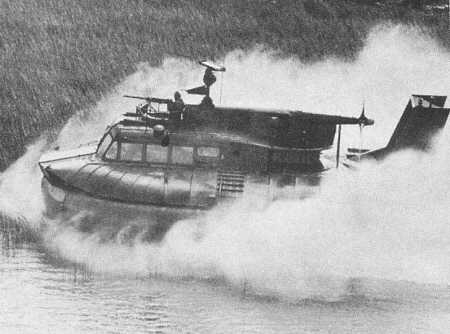
PACV cruising full speed through a swamp

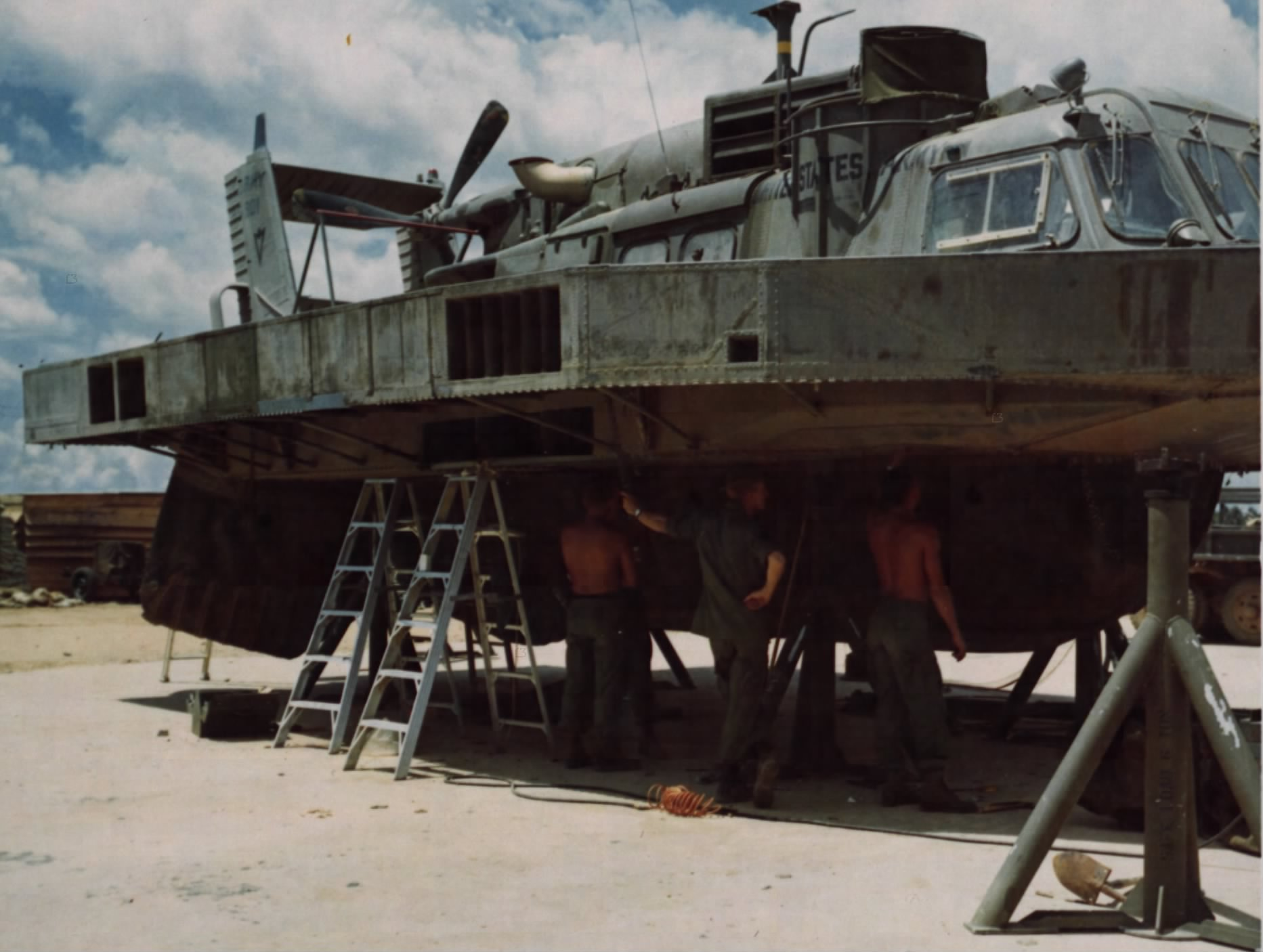
Men of the 9th Infantry Division repair a damaged PACV, 18 July 1968

Navy PACVs were deployed in Operations Game Warden and Market Time, the Navy's operations to deny Viet Cong access to resources in the Mekong Delta and prevent North Vietnamese weapons, fighters, and supplies from entering South Vietnam, respectively. The PACVs were deemed unsuitable for Operation Game Warden because of their "mechanical unreliability" and the limitations imposed on them by terrain. As a result, they were removed from the operation and transferred to another Navy unit, CTF 117. They were also found unsuitable for Market Time operations after serving in that operation from 20 September to 17 October 1966, due to their high noise, low visibility, high cost, and limited utility on the high seas or in narrow waterways. In November 1966, the Navy PACVs were used to great effect in Operation Quai Vat (Vietnamese for "Monster", which was what the Viet Cong called the PACVs). In the operation on the Plain of Reeds, conducted jointly with Vietnamese Civilian Irregular Defense Group (CIDG) troops and Army helicopters and special forces, the PACV force brought its speed and firepower to bear on the Viet Cong, killing at least 23 of them, destroying 70 of their sampans and an equal number of their structures, taking many prisoners, and capturing their supplies. This demonstration of combat prowess in the marshy terrain in southwestern Vietnam formed the basis for stationing the Army ACVs in the Plain of Reeds along the South Vietnamese/Cambodian border. An Army evaluation found that in the Plain of Reeds, "any mission requiring ground operations can best be accomplished by ACV unts," particularly reconnaissance, light assaults, infantry transport, canal security, cordoning off areas to prevent escape, and patrolling. Though the loud noise of the PACVs was an issue, their speed made up for it in this otherwise difficult terrain, especially during the monsoon season. The PACV could clear rice paddy dikes and other solid obstacles up to 3 feet (0.91 m) high and negotiate slopes of up to 6 feet (1.8 m). However, the PACV did not perform well in the dry season, with an Army evaluation noting that "The wetter the season, the better for vehicle operations".

The Navy withdrew the PACVs for overhaul in January 1967 and redeployed them to Vietnam in early 1968. Also in 1968, the Army began employing its version of the PACV, the ACV. The Army acquired the vehicles and activated their unit, the 39th Cavalry Platoon, in January before deploying them to Vietnam in April. There were only three Navy PACVs and three Army ACVs during the whole Vietnam War. Two of the three ACVs (No. 901 and 902) were Assault Air Cushion Vehicles (AACV), weapons-heavy vessels configured for attack missions, while the other (No. 903) was a Transport Air Cushion Vehicle (TACV) configured for logistics missions. The TACV only carried the twin M60s, forgoing the .50 cal and other weapons to increase space in the cabin for carrying troops. Both AACVs were lost to Viet Cong attacks. Navy PACVs were based out of Cat Lo Naval Base and operated by Task Forces 116 and 117. The three Army ACVs were operated by the 39th Cavalry Platoon, 9th Division, and were based out of Ben Luc and Đồng Tâm Base Camp, although they often deployed from fire support bases.

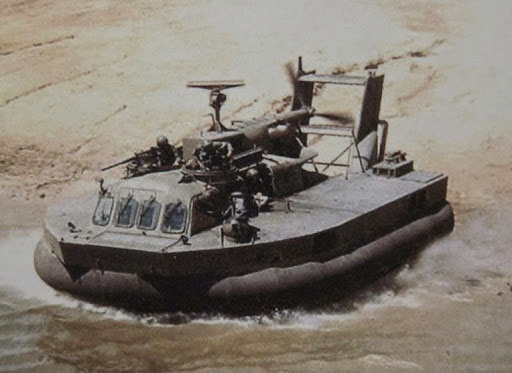
A US Army ACV patrolling the Mekong River

The Green Berets stationed in Moc Hoa became proponents of the PACVs, using them in many of their early operations. Search and destroy raids conducted out of Moc Hoa in November 1966 caught the Viet Cong by surprise and resulted in many Viet Cong deaths.

The PACV's speed, maneuverability, and firepower lent themselves to many types of missions, including patrolling, search and destroy, escorting other ships, raiding, reconnaissance, medical evacuation, transporting artillery pieces, and providing fire support to infantry. It was best suited for ambushes and raids, especially at night, when it could be easily concealed behind reeds and swamp grass. Although it was too loud to be very effective at surprise attacks, it could use its speed to raid Viet Cong bases and escape before they could react. The PACV was found to be most effective when employed in combined arms operations alongside helicopters, artillery, and other watercraft; patrol missions conducted in concert with air cavalry or Hurricane Aircat airboats were found to be especially effective. The PACV's low profile and radar also meant that it was used as a stealthy stationary radar station when its engines were off. However, Army evaluations found that the ACV had insufficient firepower, being unable to damage armored or fortified targets, and recommended that it be outfitted with heavier weapons such as TOW missiles, 20mm autocannons (such as the M139 or M61 Vulcan), or 106mm M40 recoilless rifle. They also found that it could be too loud to be used effectively for patrol and interdiction missions. Fuel resupply was another frequently cited issue for longer missions, especially given that no adequate method of refueling in the field existed.

The PACV was frequently compared to a helicopter because of its speed, terrain crossing ability, maintenance requirements, and cost. Army ACV units operated similarly to air cavalry.

Operating these highly specialized vehicles required pilots and maintenance personnel undergo considerable training, with pilots requiring 75–100 hours of flight experience before participating in combat. Training requirements meant that the Army had to set one craft aside for training for 14 days every month. Troops riding in and on the PACVs also needed training to use them safely: during evaluation, one soldier died when he fell into the hovercraft's intake, and another lost his hand to the propeller.

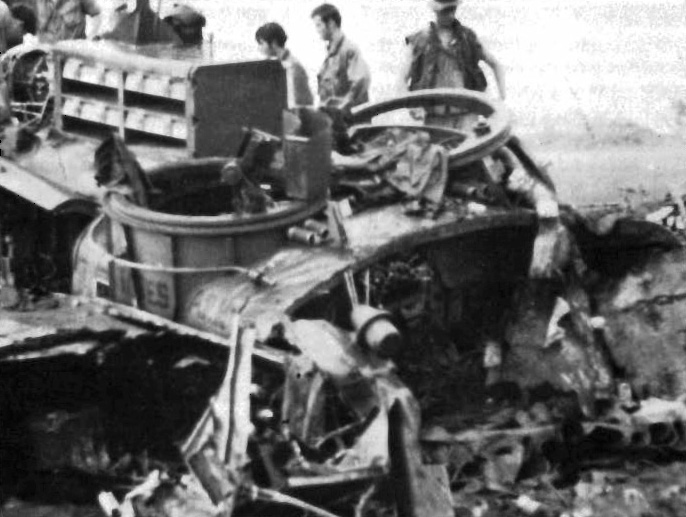
An Army ACV destroyed on 3 August 1970 by a mine. Three men died in the explosion.

Another downside of the PACV was the degree of maintenance it required: each hour of operation required 20 hours of maintenance, double the 10-hour average for contemporary military helicopters. (Note: A 1968 Army evaluation gives a lower figure of 2.1 hours of maintenance per hour of operation, although it also cites the PACV's maintenance requirements as a major downside.) An Army evaluation found that the PACV had an operationally ready rate of 55.7 percent, and all three Army ACVs were only operational during June 1969. This maintenance requirement, which was made even worse when the vehicles suffered damage, combined with the insufficient firepower to lead an Army evaluation to conclude that "there is no hope of the [PACV/ACV] unit fighting to a satisfactory conclusion in any large engagement." The PACV was also very expensive, costing about $1 million each, (Note: Equivalent to $7.75 million in 2019) as much as 13 Patrol Boat, Rivers. (Note: The Patrol Boat, River cost $75,000 ($593,000 in 2018 dollars).)

Because of their high profile and degree of threat, the PACVs and ACVs in Vietnam became major targets. The Viet Cong used ambushes and naval mines against the PACVs. Mines proved especially effective: Army ACV 902 was destroyed by a tripwire-triggered mine on 9 January 1970. Though no one onboard was killed, 14 men were injured and the attack slowed the pace of ACV operations because of Army regulations stipulating that the hovercraft work in pairs to protect each other. When ACV 901 was destroyed by a command-detonated mine on 3 August 1970, killing three, the ACVs were deactivated. The 39th ACV Platoon ceased operations on 31 August 1970 and officially left Vietnam in September, transferring their sole surviving ACV to the Army Transportation Museum in Virginia. Navy PACVs returned to the continental United States that August as well. In total, Navy PACVs saw more than 4,500 hours of operation.

== Postwar ==
=== US Coast Guard service ===
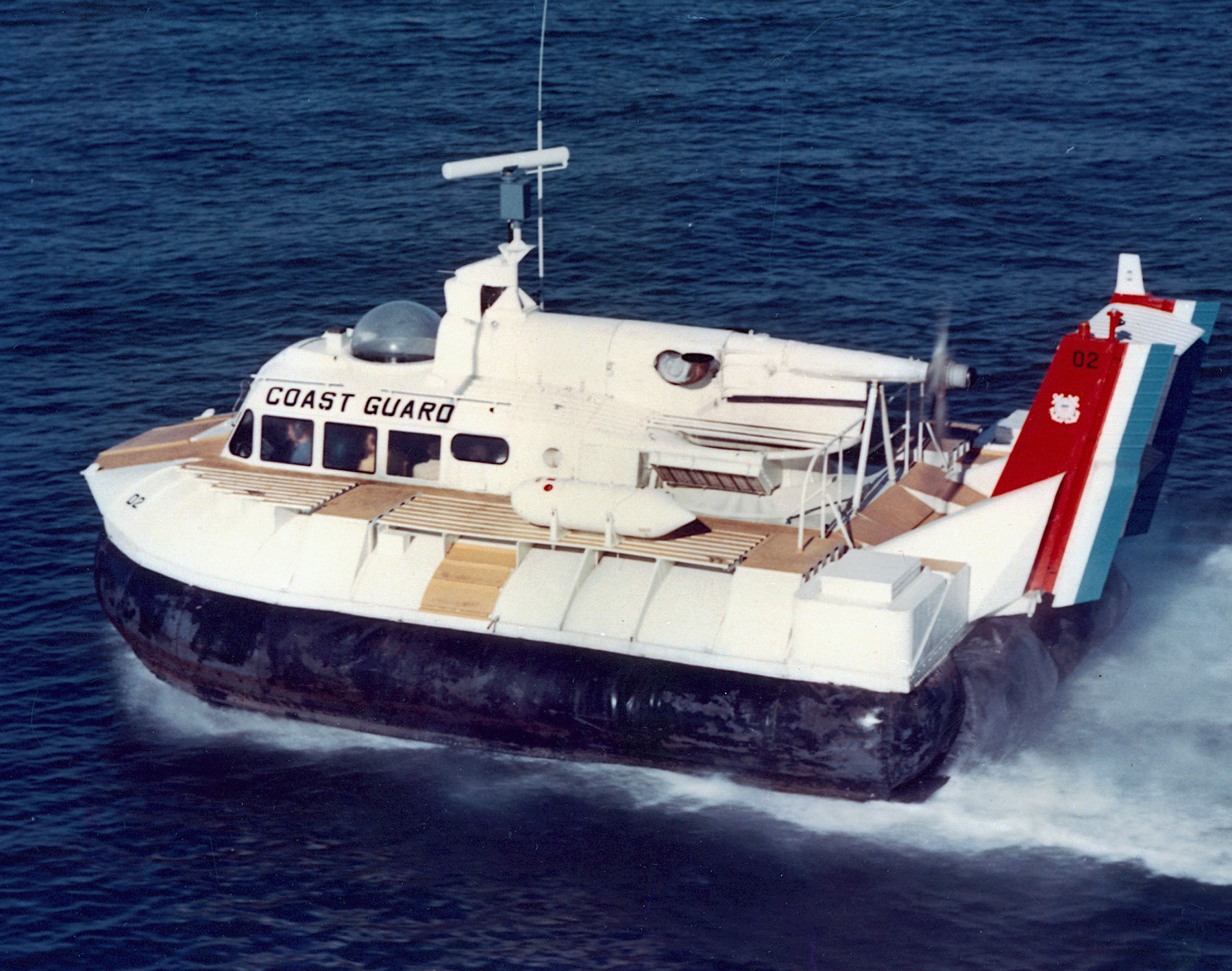
A Coast Guard ACV underway

Following their withdrawal in 1970, the Navy PACVs were transferred to the U.S. Coast Guard for evaluation. The Coast Guard used PACVs, which they called Air Cushion Vehicles (ACVs), through 1975, when they cancelled the ACV program due to budget constraints. Two were stationed at Fort Point, San Francisco and the third was used for Arctic Trials in Point Barrow, Alaska, though they were also tested in the Great Lakes and Chesapeake Bay. The Coast Guard PACVs were modified to meet their requirements by replacing the .50 cal gun mount with an observation dome and adding a KAAR LN66 radar and search-and-rescue equipment. Coast Guard PACVs were crewed by 3—operator, radar operator and navigator, and search-and-rescue crewman—and could carry 6 passengers and half a ton of cargo. Because it was lighter than the military version, the Coast Guard ACV could go up to 70 knots (81 mph; 130 km/h) and had a range of 300 nautical miles (350 mi; 560 km).

The ACVs in Coast Guard service were used primarily for search-and-rescue missions because of their speed and range. In over 185 search-and-rescue missions, they towed boats up to 44-foot (13 m) long and recovered survivors from the water and then rushed them to the shore. However, they were also used to service buoys, resupply and repair remote lighthouses and lightships, enforce laws, clean up oil spills, and ferry personnel and supplies. For minor repairs to buoys, the ACV shortened what was normally a full day mission by a fully crewed ship to a 2-3 hour one by an ACV with three crew members. The ACV was fast enough that it was able to respond to search-and-rescue calls while servicing buoys, something that was not possible for regular Coast Guard cutters. However, servicing structures in choppy weather on the open sea was found to be dangerous. The ACV proved particularly effective in the Arctic because it could traverse water and ice equally well at high speeds, although crews did encounter some issues relating to windshield icing.

At least one ACV was active in San Francisco Bay 24/7, and a special hangar for the ACVs was built at the Coast Guard Station at Fort Point from August 1970 to 1972. (Note: The episode "Deathwatch" of The Streets of San Francisco was filmed in 1972 and features an ACV in the climactic scene.) The San Francisco ACVs were evaluated for use as a crash/fire rescue vehicle at Oakland International Airport in 1972 and were found to be successful. One of the San Francisco-based ACVs was showcased by the Coast Guard at the U.S. International Transportation Exposition at Dulles International Airport in 1972, where it was inspected by tens of thousands of international visitors. Over the first two years of evaluation, the Coast Guard ACVs accrued over 1,500 hours of operating time.

As part of the evaluation, the ACV at Point Barrow was transferred to Traverse City, Michigan for refurbishment and then stationed at St. Ignace Coast Guard Station on Lake Huron. It sank on 23 November 1971 after only 26 hours of operation in Lake Huron, after the cabin was breached by a rock and the engine inexplicably failed, leading the craft to take on water and sink. After this sinking, one of the two San Francisco ACVs was then transferred to the Great Lakes. Another was transferred to the East Coast, where it performed aids to navigation survey/inspection and search-and-rescue operations on Chesapeake Bay, while the third remained in San Francisco Bay. The Chesapeake ACV was found to be particularly valuable for search-and-rescue operations in marshy or shallow waters. In the final Coast Guard evaluation, Commander Thomas Lutton wrote that "The ACV has dramatically and repeatedly demonstrated its capability to effectively perform a wide range of Coast Guard missions." However, the Coast Guard was in the middle of a large upgrade of its other boats and cutters at the time and so did not have the money to acquire ACVs. As such, the two surviving ACVs were transferred to US Army Mobility Equipment Research and Development Center in Fort Belvoir, Virginia, on 25 April 1975.

=== Survivors ===
- The sole surviving Army ACV (No. 903) was transferred to the U.S. Army Transportation Museum in Fort Eustis, Virginia, where it is still on display as of 2018.
- The only surviving US Navy PACV (No. 004) is preserved at the Yanks Air Museum in Chino, California.

== See also ==
- Hurricane Aircat
- LACV-30
- Landing Craft Air Cushion
- List of patrol vessels of the United States Navy
