= Piccadilly Lilly II =

American heavy bomber built in 1945

Boeing B-17G Flying Fortress Piccadilly Lilly II
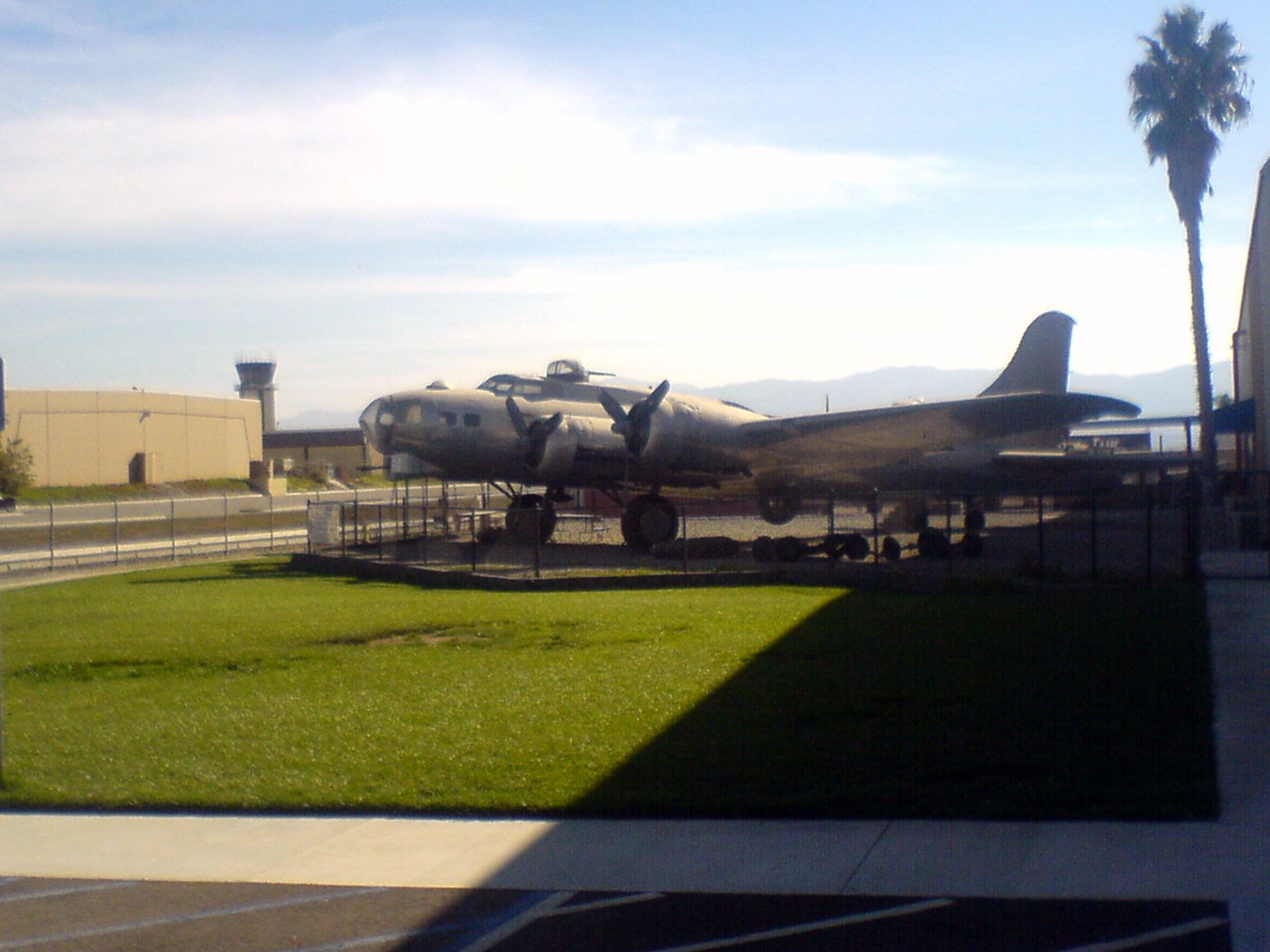
- The aircraft on display in 2007

General information
- Type: Boeing B-17G-90-DL Flying Fortress
- Manufacturer: Douglas Aircraft Company
- Registration: N3713G
- Serial: 44-83684

History
- Manufactured: 1945
- Preserved at: Planes of Fame in Chino, California; 33.98127°N 117.63931°W

Piccadilly Lilly II is a B-17 Flying Fortress currently on display at the Planes of Fame air museum in Chino, California. Built in 1945 as a B-17G and assigned serial number 44-83684, this plane was possibly the last aircraft assigned to the Eighth Air Force / 447th Bomb Group, but perhaps not delivered. It was the last active B-17 in the United States Air Force, and retired in 1959 after nine years as a DB-17P drone director. Following its military career, the plane appeared in various television shows and movies.

== History ==
=== Military use ===
B-17G serial number 44-83684 was built in May 1945 in Long Beach, California, by Douglas Aircraft under license from Boeing. She was accepted into service on May 7, 1945, and placed into storage on May 11, 1945, since the War in Europe had ended on May 8, 1945. She remained in storage through June 21, 1950, when her designation was changed from B-17G to DB-17G. She then went on to serve from 1950 through 1956 with the 3200th and 3205th Drone Group and Proof Test Wing at Eglin AFB, Holloman AFB and Eniwetok Atoll. Her mission was as a drone controller and was used to monitor the Greenhouse Series of nuclear testing at Eniwetok Atoll in the 1950s.

The plane's designation was changed again in November 1956 from DB-17G to DB-17P and was used as a drone controller at Holloman AFB with the 3225th Drone Squadron from 1956 through 1959. Her last mission was on August 6, 1959, when she controlled a QB-17G 44-83717 drone as a target for a Falcon air-to-air missile fired by an F-101B Voodoo jet fighter. A few days later, she was officially retired in a ceremony at Holloman AFB as the last of 12,731 B-17s to serve with the U.S. Army Air Forces / U.S. Air Force.

=== Post-military use ===
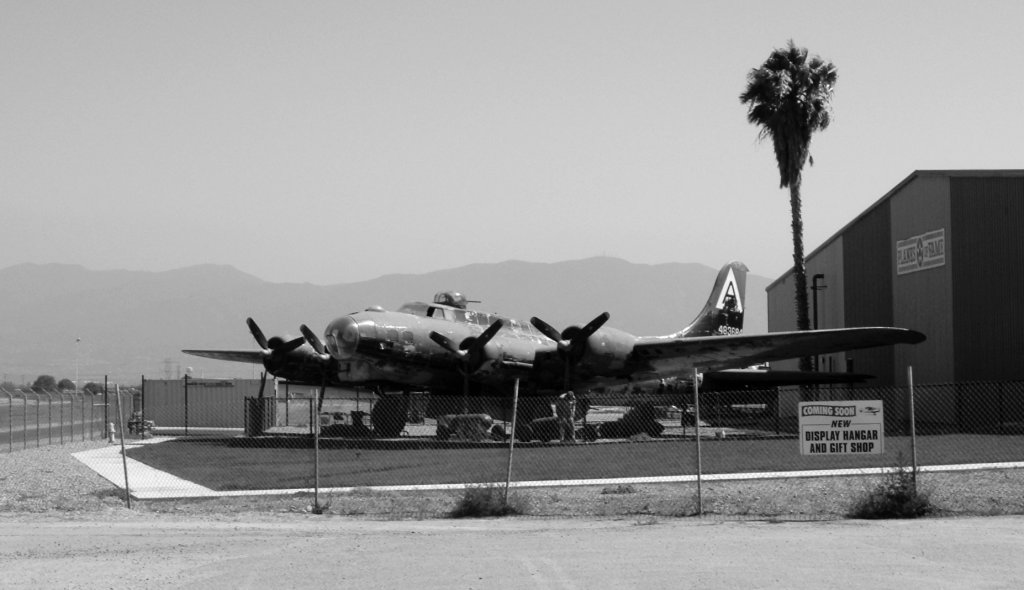
Piccadilly Lilly II in 2005

The plane became a part of the Planes of Fame collection on September 24, 1959, which was then located in Claremont, California. Planes of Fame founder Edward T. Maloney put her to work right away appearing on TV's The Dick Powell Theater in a program about the famed 100th Bomb Group ("the Bloody Hundredth"). She later became known as Piccadilly Lilly II when she was used in the popular 1960's TV series 12 O'Clock High. She was redressed to represent the numerous aircraft which comprised the mythical 918th Bomb Group. She also appeared in The Thousand Plane Raid as well as Black Sheep Squadron. She was flown by Planes of Fame from 1959 through 1971. She was grounded in 1971 and has been on display since then in Chino, California. The plane is assigned civil registration N3713G by the Federal Aviation Administration (FAA).

== Restoration ==
In late 2008, the museum assembled a volunteer restoration team to accelerate the process of bringing B-17G serial number 44-83684, Piccadilly Lilly II, back to flight condition. In 2009, significant progress was made with respect to the short-term goals of 1) enhancing the visitor experience and 2) systematically repairing and mitigating on-going degradation of structural components. Efforts have focused on the restoration of various crew stations so that visitors can more easily put themselves in the shoes of a young crew member at 25,000 feet (7,600 m) on a bombing run over enemy territory in late World War II.

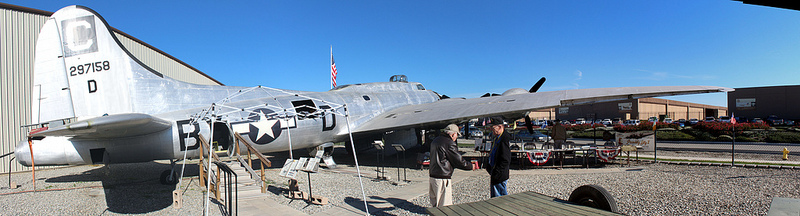
Piccadilly Lilly II under restoration in January 2013

The ball turret has been restored and a machine gun (with new ammo box) mounted in one of the waist gunner positions. New gun barrels were fabricated and added to the tail and chin positions and a fully refurbished, modified top turret has been installed. Both the ball turret and top turret can be manually operated. New signage (part of an Eagle Scout project) directs visitor attention to, and provides information about, various features of the aircraft. Crew station equipment, particularly in the radio compartment and tail gunner positions are being restored, replaced with new surplus items, or if necessary, fabricated in preparation for reinstallation when structural repairs are completed in those positions. The tail cone has been removed and structural repairs in it are nearing completion after the tedious task of stripping all old paint was completed. The same is true of the radio compartment where structural repairs are underway following the laborious task of stripping paint. All equipment from the nose has been removed from the aircraft. Stripping paint from the nose and performing much needed repairs there will follow completion of the tail gunner and radio operator positions. Wooden components have been rebuilt or refabricated, including the floor in the waist, an electrical junction box in the bomb bay, two ammo boxes (the first two of several), the tail gunner seat, the radio operator's desk (using mostly original wooden components), and the navigator's desk with the restoration and re-fabrication of interior wooden doors is still in progress. All props have been stripped and prepared for painting plus the tail wheel assembly and main landing gear have been cleaned and repainted. Restoration of peripheral equipment such as bombs and bomb carts is also nearing completion.

In addition to the structural repairs in the radio compartment and tail gunner position, numerous repairs have been made to the horizontal and vertical stabilizers and related fairings. The vertical stabilizer is ready for remounting. Radio mounting brackets and landing light housings have been refabricated from scratch.

When completed, the plane will be one of the very few Flying Fortresses in the world in flying condition. In 2010, the total cost of restoration was estimated to be about $1 million.

Photos taken in 2019 show the plane wearing the livery of two other B-17s: 42–102605 on the left side and 42–97158 on the right side.
