= Edward T. Maloney =

American historian

- Born: May 21, 1928
- Died: August 19, 2016 (aged 88)
- Writing career
- Subject: Aviation history

Edward T. Maloney (May 21, 1928 – August 19, 2016) was an American aviation historian based in Southern California.

== Life ==
During World War II, he joined the Civil Air Patrol. He later attended UCLA before transferring to Claremont Men's College, where he graduated in 1952.

Maloney began building model airplanes when he was 12 years old and by May 1953 he had a collection of over 200 of them.

By early 1961, he was chairman of the Pomona Exchange Club.

He assembled much of the collection of historic airframes displayed at the Planes of Fame Museum at Chino Airport, Chino, California.

Maloney believed that today's scrap is tomorrow's history, and in 1946 began collecting odd airframes for a future museum. His first item was reportedly a Mitsubishi J8M rocket-powered interceptor.

Maloney opened his first aviation museum at Claremont, California, on January 12, 1957, and then moved to Ontario International Airport in Ontario, California, in the 1960s. His collection included several military aircraft including a rare P-26 Peashooter, a P-51A, a Hanriot HD.1, a Heinkel He 162, the Northrop N9M flying wing testbed, the nose section of a B-36 Peacemaker bomber. It also includes the last B-17 Flying Fortress bomber in United States Air Force operation, the drone-director Piccadilly Lilly II (44-83684). This B-17 starred in the 12 O'Clock High television series from 1964 to 1966. Interactive displays included a vintage World War II gunnery training machine.

In 1969, Maloney was forced to move his collection from the Ontario Airport hangar, and chose its present location at Chino Airport.

Maloney was inducted in the EAA Warbirds of America Hall of Fame in 2001.

== Personal life ==
Maloney married Alice Louise Bromley on 26 November 1949 and had four children. His daughter, Karen, married Steve Hinton. His son, Jim, was killed in the crash of a PT-22 on 21 May 1983. He died on 19 August 2016.
