= Construction Battalion Maintenance Unit 302 =

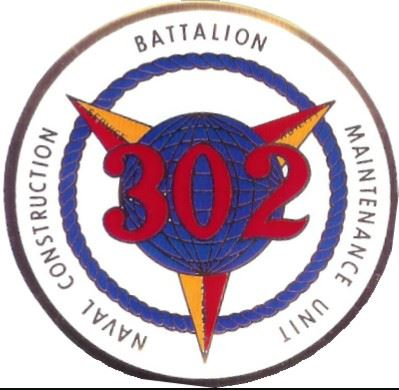
- CBMU 302 insignia
- Country: United States
- Branch: USN
- Homeport: Cam Ranh Bay, Republic of Vietnam
- Anniversaries: 31 March 1967 commissioned July 1994 decommissioned
- Engagements: Vietnam War; Operation Provide Comfort

Construction Battalion Maintenance Unit THREE ZERO TWO (CBMU-302) of the U.S. Navy was commissioned on 31 March 1967. Along with a sister unit, CBMU-301, was also commissioned. They were the first CBMUs commissioned since the two that came and went with the Korean War. The official commissioning ceremony of CBMU-301 and CBMU-302 was held at the U.S. Naval Construction Battalion Center, Port Hueneme, CA on 7 April 1967. LT Mel Harper was the first commanding officer.

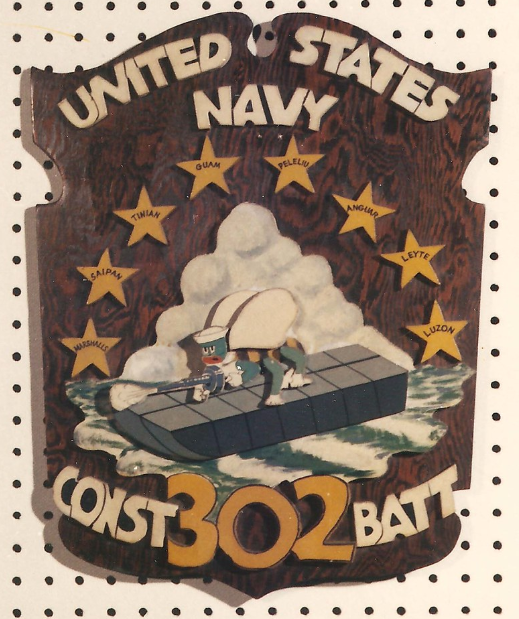
302 CB WWII unit insignia. (Seabee Museum)

== History ==
On 16 August 1967, CBMU-302's Advance Party of fifty men were deployed to Cam Ranh Bay, Republic of Vietnam (RVN).

On 15 September 1967, the main body of the battalion flew to the U.S. Naval Support Facility, Cam Ranh Bay, Vietnam. Two Details were soon deployed to Nha Trang and Qui Nhơn to support Navy units there. During this time, the battalion was waiting for the arrival of a ship that contained the unit's building supplies, vehicles, and construction equipment. The ship arrived 7 October 1967, with offloading proceeding immediately.

The main mission of CBMU-302 was to perform base maintenance and public works functions at the various U.S. Navy and Vietnamese Navy sites in the lower two-thirds of the country. CBMU-302 also sent out short-term special mission teams to perform specific tasks. These small groups were called Special Teams.

In September 1969, the battalion's mission was expanded to include the Dependent Shelter Construction Program. This effort involved the construction of permanent structures to house Vietnamese Navy Sailors and their families at naval facilities in II, III, and IV Corps. In September 1970, CBMU-301 began leaving Vietnam for decommissioning (they too were engaged in the Dependent Shelter Program in I Corps). At that time, CBMU-302 moved up into I Corps to take over CBMU-301's job sites (notably at Da Nang with a further site at Tan My Island near Hue and eventually one at Chu Lai). By now, the Dependent Shelter Program became the principal mission for CBMU-302. The remote units of the Dependent Shelter Program to which those Seabees and non-construction U.S. Navy personnel were assigned were soon referred to as Naval Construction Action Teams (NAVCATs). CBMU 302 had 23 NAVCATS total with 15 active at its peak. Teams were numbered 1–23. They were VADM Zumwalt's wholesale expansion of the Seabee Team theory submitted in November 1968 to Gen Abrams.

Given the huge expanded role of both battalions due to the Shelter program, general labor personnel were needed since there were not enough trained Seabees available. U.S. Navy Sailors from the other three Navy communities (Airmen, Seamen, Firemen) were assigned to both units. Having limited, or no construction skills, these men quickly learned their jobs of mixing mortar, laying block, placing concrete, stringing electrical lines, carpentry, etc. Their efforts was needed and appreciated, especially considering they were serving in a combat zone. In the end the good intentions of the Shelter Program were lost on RVN sailors who did not want to move their family's into government housing that they saw as a potential target for the Viet Cong.

During the battalion's time in Vietnam, it:

- Was the first CB to operate in the three lower divisions of the Republic of Vietnam (Corps Tactical Zones II, III, IV)
- Became the largest Seabee battalion since WWII
- In Oct 1970, the only CB to operate in all four Corps Tactical Zones at the same time
- Was the only CB to have Seabees authorized to wear a shoulder patch for being members of a Naval Construction Action Team.
- Was the longest serving CB in Vietnam with over 4.5 years service.

In April 1971, the battalion's headquarters relocated from Cam Ranh Bay to the large Army base at Bien Hoa.

CBMU-302 was the last Seabee battalion to leave the Vietnam war zone, folding its colors at its base-camp in Bien Hoa, RVN on 22 January 1972 then redeploying back to Port Hueneme, CA. During the unit's short stay in Port Hueneme, it was downsized and fitted out with new personnel for its new role of maintenance for a single navy base.

April 1972 CBMU-302 deployed with one officer and twenty-five enlisted men to Subic Bay Naval Base in the Republic of the Philippines. CBMU-302 performed construction and maintenance on base and served the local communities with civic action projects and educational programs.

CBMU-302 constructed Camp Jefferies to support Construction Battalion Detachments deployed to the Subic Bay and Cubi Point Naval Air Station. CBMU-302 personal maintained Camp Jeffries to allow Battalion Detachment personnel to focus on construction activities. This provided on the job training for CBMU-302 personnel who would be deploying to Detail Paradise on Diego Garcia. CBMU-302 provided facilities support to the USN Base at Yokohama and Yosuka, Japan when local workers went on strike in 1975. Local national workers went on strike for several days in Subic Bay, Pi. during 1979. CBMU-302 personnel operated critical facilities to include power plants, telephone exchanges, water and sewage treatment plants in support of US Navy fleet operations. Seabees from CBMU-302 provided support to Operation New Life following the fall of South Vietnam by building facilities on Grande Island to house, feed, and provide necessary services to the refugees. Facilities were also constructed at the lower MAU Camp and All Hands Beach. Repairs to the upper MAU facilities were also made in the mid 80's. Camp Jeffries was closed March 1992.

The unit was transferred to Guam from Subic Bay to perform the same overall mission of facilities support. CBMU-302 was decommissioned in Guam in 1994.

== Vietnam deployments ==
The first teams deployed were called Mobile Construction Details or 'Dets' This is a list of locations and the Corp Tactical zone it is located in.

Detail	Location	Region
Det. Alpha	Qui Nhơn	2
Det. Bravo	Nha Trang	2
Det. Charlie	Cat Lo	3
Det. Delta	Đồng Tâm	4
Det. Echo	Sa Đéc	4
Det. Foxtrot	Binh Thuy	4
Det. Golf	Cam Ranh Bay	2
Det. Hotel	An Thoi Naval Base	4
Det. India	Bến Lức	4
Det. Sierra	Nhà Bè	3
Det. Sparks	Nha Trang	2
Det. Juliet	Đồng Tân	4

Starting in 1970, President Richard M. Nixon started the Vietnamization program. This resulted in CBMU-302s participation in the Dependent Shelter Construction Program. To accomplish this large task the Navy reassigned sailors from the Fleet. These men came from ships, shore installations, air stations, etc. They were assigned to detachments called Navy Construction Action Teams or NAVCATs. With the decommissioning of CBMU-301, some of their men wanted to remain in Vietnam to finish out their assignment. Their unfinished projects were turned over to CBMU-302. The following is a list of locations and which Corp Tactical zone it was located in.

Team	Location	Region
NAVCAT-1	Da Nang	1
NAVCAT-2	NSF – Cam Ranh Bay	2
NAVCAT-3	VNNTC – Cam Ranh Bay	2
NAVCAT-4	Thu Duc	3
NAVCAT-5	Ben Luc	4
NAVCAT-6	An Thoi	4
NAVCAT-7	Dong Tam	4
NAVCAT-8	Cuu Long	2
NAVCAT-9	Nha Trang	2
NAVCAT-11	Hon Khoi	2
NAVCAT-12	Binh Ba Is./ Cam Ranh Bay	2
NAVCAT-13	Rach Dua/ Chu Lai	2
NAVCAT-14	An Khan	3
NAVCAT-15	Qui Nhơn	2
NAVCAT-16	NAF Cam Ranh Bay/ Block Plant	2
NAVCAT-17	Rach Soi	4
NAVCAT-18	Saigon/ Block Plant	3
NAVCAT-19	Tân Mỹ Base	2
NAVCAT-20	Nam Canh	4 (Nam Canh – Wikipedia tiếng Việt)
NAVCAT-21	Cou La Rae Is.	3
NAVCAT-22	Chợ Mới	4
NAVCAT-23	Poulo Obi	3

== Commanding officers ==
- LT Melvin H. Harper, CEC; Apr 1967 – Sept 1968, Cam Ranh Bay, RVN
- LCDR Herman. W. Filbry, CEC; Sept 1968 – Aug 1969, Cam Ranh Bay, RVN
- LCDR Heywood H. Harrell, CEC; Aug 1969 – Aug 1970, Cam Ranh Bay, RVN
- CDR Henry Keppel, CEC; Aug 1970 – Aug 1971, Cam Ranh Bay, RVN
- CDR. D. Gordan Wilson, CEC; Aug 1971 – Feb 1972, Bien Hoa, RVN
- Lt. Walter Tomiak, CEC; Feb 1972 – Oct 1973 Bien Hoa, RVN.
- LT James W. MacLaughlin; CEC; Oct 1973 – 1975, Subic Bay, PI.
- LT William Davis, CEC; 1975 – 1978, Subic Bay, PI.
- LT Douglas K. Ault, CEC; 1979 – 1981, Subic Bay, PI.
- LT/LCDR Samual S. Williams, CEC; 1981 – 1983, Subic Bay, PI.
- LCDR Jon C. Wyman, CEC; 1983 – 1985; Subic Bay, PI.
- LT R. J. Clark, CEC; 1985 – 1987; Subic Bay, PI.
- LT J. Smythe. CEC; 1987–1990, Subic Bay, R.P
- LT M. R. Libonate, CEC; 1990 – 1992; Camp Covington, Guam
- LT Keith S. Hamilton, CEC; 1994 – 22 July 1994, Camp Covington, Guam

== Unit awards ==
Vietnam Service 11 awards

- Navy Unit Commendation: with two bronze stars, (3 awards) Vietnam
- Navy Meritorious Unit Commendation with bronze star (2 awards)
- Republic of Vietnam Gallantry Cross with Palm Unit Award
- Vietnam Civil Actions Medal (individual award)
- Vietnam Service Medal: – 11 awards
- Vietnam Campaign Medal service ribbon with 60– Device : (11 campaign award periods)
- Joint Meritorious Unit Award :
- Navy Expeditionary Medal
- National Defense Service Medal Vietnam
- National Defense Service Medal
- Humanitarian Service Medal :
- Humanitarian Service Medal :
- Navy and Marine Corps Sea Service Deployment Ribbon (7 awards)
- Navy and Marine Corps Overseas Service Ribbon (15 awards)
- Philippine Republic Presidential Unit Citation

== See also ==
- Admiral Ben Moreell
- Amphibious Construction Battalion One (ACB-1)
- Amphibious Construction Battalion TWO (ACB-2)
- Civil Engineer Corps United States Navy
- Naval Construction Battalion aka Seabee
- Naval Amphibious Base Little Creek
- Naval Amphibious Base Coronado
- Naval Construction Battalion Center (Gulfport, Mississippi)
- Naval Construction Battalion Center Port Hueneme
- Naval Mobile Construction Battalion 1
- Naval Mobile Construction Battalion 3
- Naval Mobile Construction Battalion 4
- Naval Mobile Construction Battalion 5
- Naval Mobile Construction Battalion 11
- Naval Mobile Construction Battalion 25
- Naval Mobile Construction Battalion 133
- Operation Provide Comfort
- Seabees
- Seabees in World War II
