= SK-5 =

SK-5 may refer to

- Casio SK-5, a sampling machine
- Bell SK-5, a licence built version of the SR.N5 hovercraft
