= Cat Lo Naval Base =

Former joint naval base in Vietnam

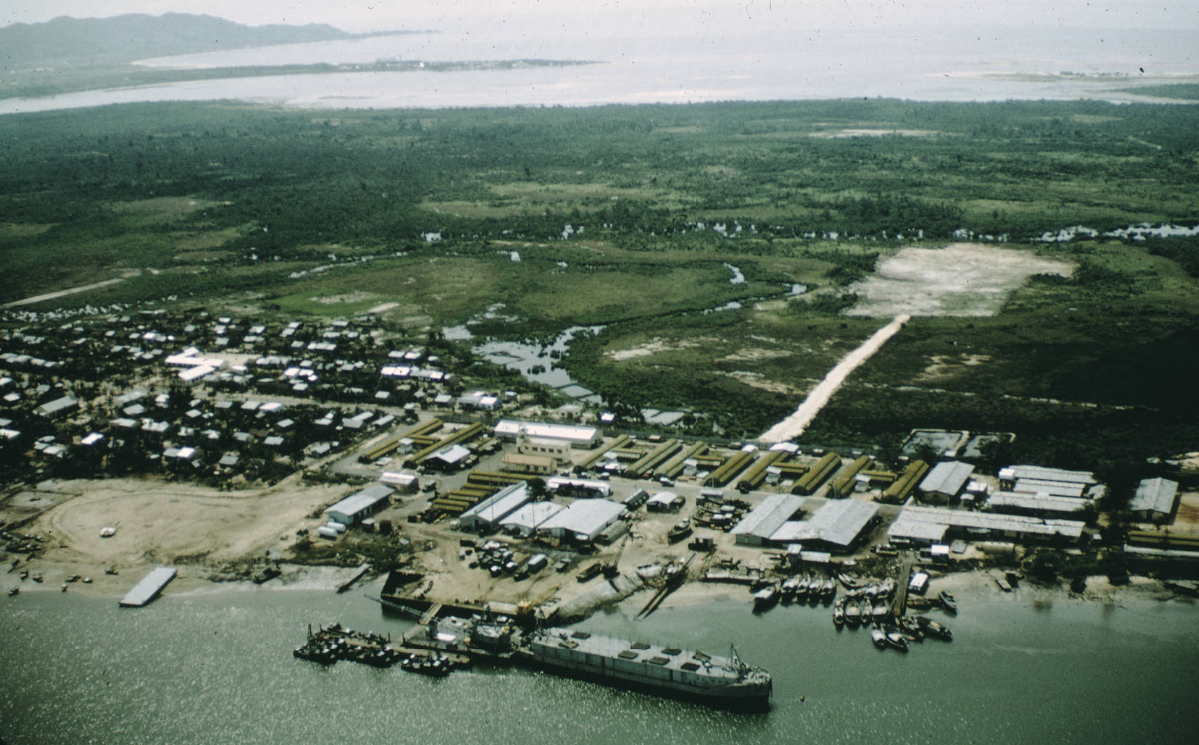
- Cat Lo, 26 September 1967

Site information
- Type: Navy

Location
- Coordinates: 10.4125°N 107.127°E

Site history
- Built: 1966
- In use: 1966–1975
- Battles/wars: Vietnam War

Garrison information
- Occupants: Division 13, Coast Guard Squadron One

Cat Lo Naval Base is a former United States Navy, U.S. Coast Guard, and Republic of Vietnam Navy (RVNN) base approximately 10 kilometres (6.2 mi) northeast of Vũng Tàu in southern Vietnam that was used during the Vietnam War.

== History ==
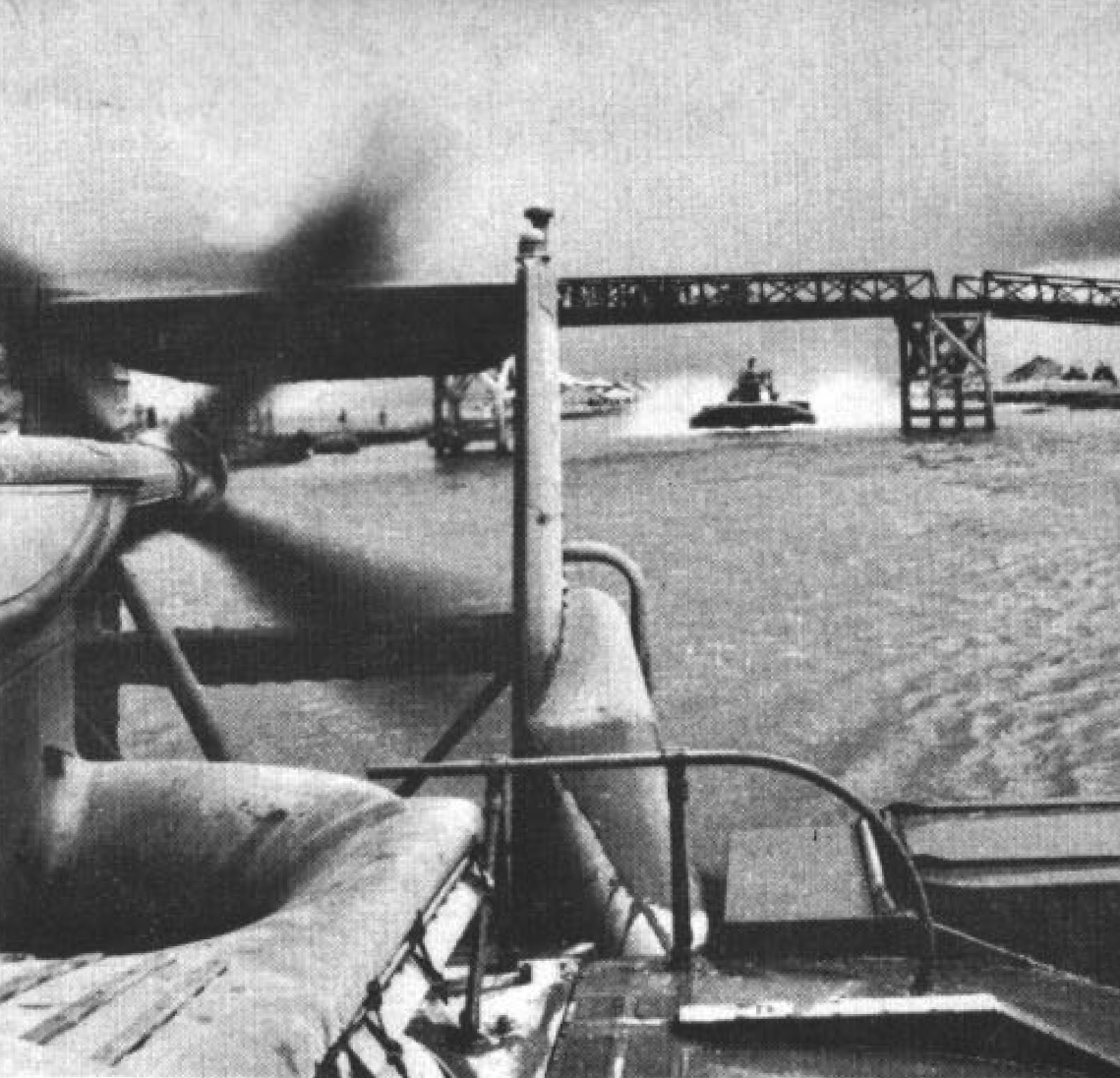
Navy PACV hovercraft returning to Cat Lo c.1966

In October 1965, the U.S. Navy selected Cat Lo as the base for Swift Boat Squadron 1, Division 103 with 14 Swift Boats to be based there with berthing, messing and basic repair facilities. Dredging to build the base facilities eventually took 3 years and it housed over 600 personnel. Construction Battalion Maintenance Unit 302 Detachment C was based at Cat Lo during the base construction.

On 22 February 1966, the newly established Division 13, Coast Guard Squadron One began operations from Cat Lo.

In early 1966 PBRs of River Divisions 53 and 54 began operations from Cat Lo. PACV Division 107 operating the experimental Patrol Air Cushion Vehicle also operated out of Cat Lo during their first deployment to the Vietnam War.

It was home to a radio transmitter that broadcast AFN.

The base was handed over to the RVNN on 28 April 1971.
