= Miles & Atwood Special =

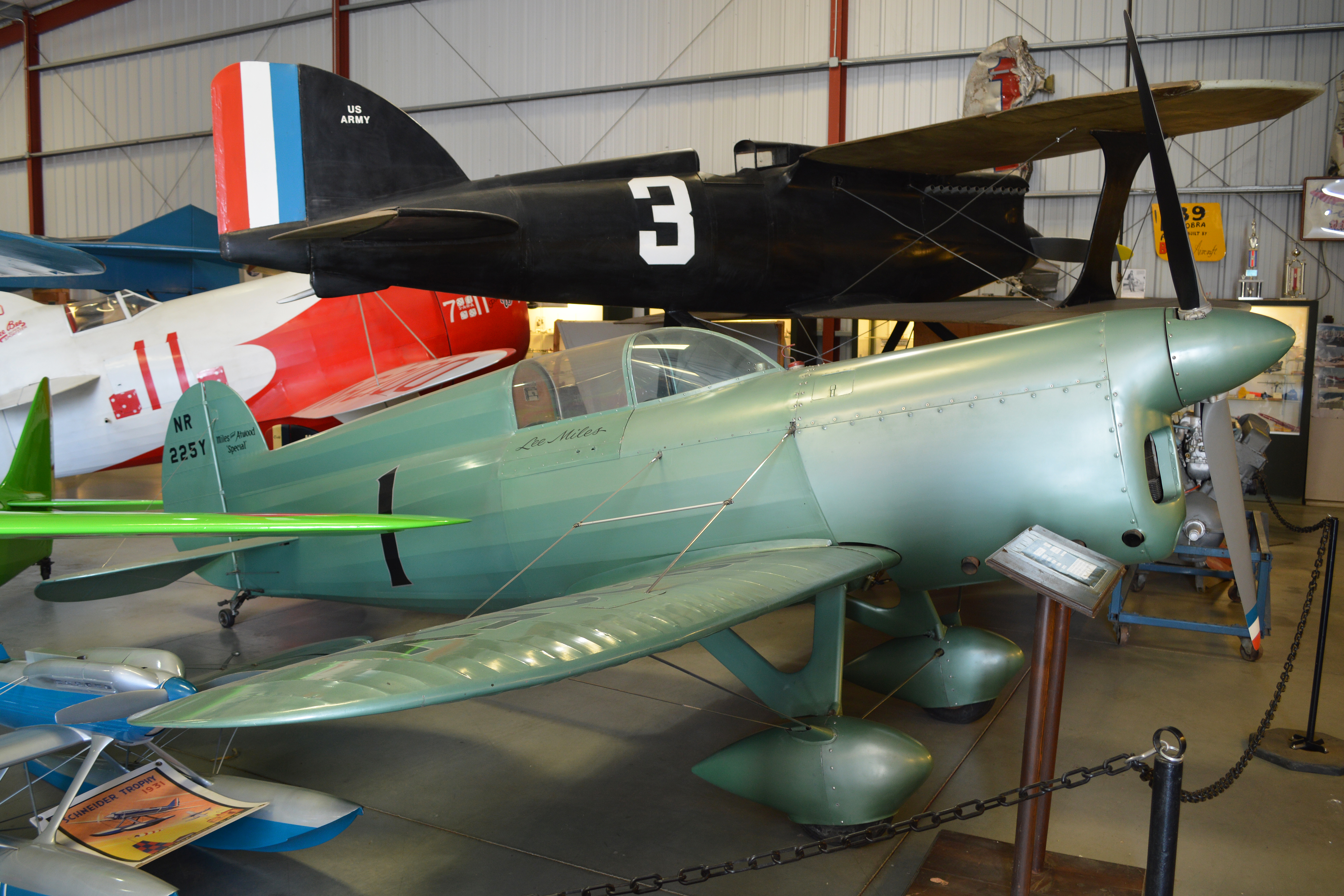
- Miles and Atwood Special replica at the Planes of Fame Air Museum

General information
- Type: Air racing
- National origin: United States
- Designer: Lawrence W Brown
- Number built: 1

The Miles & Atwood Special is a racing aircraft developed during the interwar period

== Development ==
The Miles & Atwood Special is a single seat, low-wing, open cockpit, racing aircraft with conventional landing gear. It was built by Leon Atwood and Lee Miles.

The aircraft uses solid wood spars. Fabric was attached using a relatively new process using screws with fabric tape covering, rather than conventional rib-stitching. The aircraft raced with a green livery waxed to a high gloss. Lee Miles died when a flying wire broke in a 1937 qualifying race.

== Operational history ==
- National Air Races - Set a world speed record for an aircraft under 770 lb (349 kg) over 62 mi (100 km) course at 206 mph (332 km/h).
- Won 1933 Greve Trophy
- Chicago Air Race - Straight Line speed record for aircraft with less than 375 cubic inch displacement of 225 mph (362 km/h).
- In February 1934, the Miles & Atwood Special won the Shell Trophy
- Sixth place in 1935 Greve race

== Specifications (Miles & Atwood Special) ==
Data from History's Most Important Racing Aircraft

General characteristics

- Crew: 1
- Length: 16 ft 9 in (5.11 m)
- Wingspan: 16 ft 8 in (5.08 m)
- Powerplant: 1 × Menasco C-4-S , 185 hp (138 kW)
