= Chino Airport =

Airport in San Bernardino County, California

- IATA: CNO; ICAO: KCNO; FAA LID: CNO

Summary
- Airport type: Public
- Owner: County of San Bernardino
- Location: Chino, California
- Elevation AMSL: 650 ft (200 m)
- Coordinates: 33°58′29″N 117°38′12″W
- Website: cms.sbcounty.gov
- Interactive map of Chino Airport

Runways
Direction	Length		Surface
Direction	ft	m	Surface
3/21	4,919	1,499	Asphalt
8L/26R	4,858	1,481	Asphalt
8R/26L	7,000	2,134	Asphalt

Statistics (2016)
- Aircraft operations (year ending 9/30/2016): 164,588
- Based aircraft: 590
- Source: Federal Aviation Administration

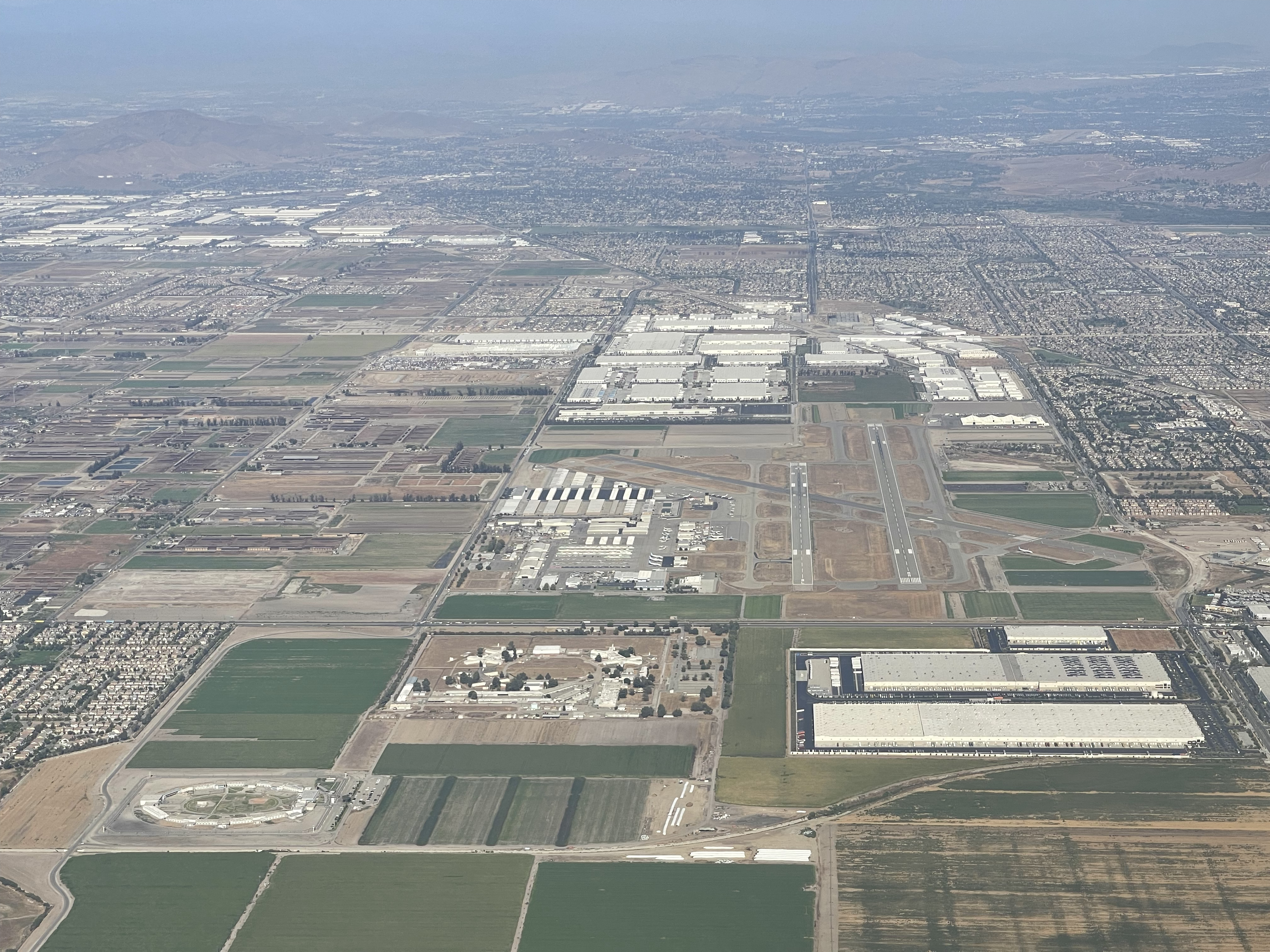
An aerial view of Chino Airport and its immediate surroundings.

Chino Airport (IATA: CNO, ICAO: KCNO, FAA LID: CNO) is a county-owned airport about three miles southeast of Chino, in San Bernardino County, California, United States. The Federal Aviation Administration's National Plan of Integrated Airport Systems for 2007–2011 classified it as a reliever airport, due to its proximity to the Ontario International Airport and the John Wayne Airport (in Orange County).

== History ==
Cal-Aero Academy was an independent flying school at Chino Airport when World War II started. The U.S. Army Air Forces contracted with the school to provide basic and primary flight training for Army Air Cadets. The Abbott and Costello film Keep 'Em Flying was filmed at the base.

During the war, Cal-Aero operated the training base with Stearmans and BT-13s. The name "Cal-Aero" is preserved at the airport and it can be seen on several buildings.

Starting in early 1945, training aircraft surplused by the cessation of pilot training programs, and post-war, hundreds of combat aircraft were flown into Chino for disposal. This agricultural area was employed as a vast parking lot for warplanes. Soon, the entire area was filled with everything from T-6s to B-24 Liberators. Most planes met an undignified end in portable smelters which were brought there to melt down the warplanes into aluminum ingots.

During the mid-1960s, the field was used as the location setting for the TV series 12 O'Clock High, as the fictitious Archbury Army Air Field, which was home base to the (equally fictitious) 918th Bomb Group. The airfield itself and a number of World War II-era buildings were used for exterior shots.

Chino Airport is the home of two aircraft museums, the Planes of Fame and the Yanks Air Museum, and the airport is one of the centers of aircraft restoration and preservation with several different companies that do this work at the airport.

== Accidents and incidents ==
- On November 6, 2007, a Beechcraft King Air impacted trees 3/4 of a mile past the departure end of runway 26R after takeoff in poor visibility. Both occupants were killed.
- On June 13, 2013, a private jet crashed into an empty office building near a hangar. Maintenance workers were testing the jet engines when the plane jumped over the chocks and the workers lost control. Since the building was empty, no one was seriously hurt, but the jet was destroyed.

== Facilities ==
Chino Airport covers 1,097 acres (444 ha) and has three asphalt runways:

- 3/21: 4,919 x 150 ft (1,499 x 46 m)
- 8L/26R: 4,858 x 150 ft (1,481 x 46 m)
- 8R/26L: 7,000 x 150 ft (2,134 x 46 m)

== General aviation ==
In the year ending September 30, 2016, the airport had 164,588 aircraft operations, an average of 451 per day: 99% general aviation and less than 1% air taxi. At that time, 590 aircraft were based at the airport: 424 single-engine, 86 multi-engine, 64 jet, and 16 helicopters.

FBOs:

- Encore Jet Center
- Threshold Aviation Group

== See also ==
- List of airports in California
- California World War II Army Airfields
