= SR.N5 =

1964 hovercraft model by Saunders-Roe

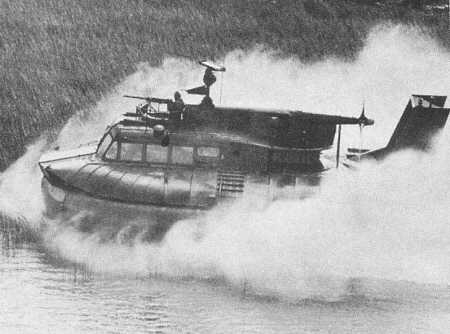
- US Navy PACV (SK-5) in Vietnam

Class overview
- Name: SR.N5 Warden class
- Builders: British Hovercraft Corporation
- Preceded by: SR.N3
- Built: 1964-1968
- Completed: 14

General characteristics
- Type: Hovercraft
- Displacement: 17,500 lb (7.9 t) maximum
- Length: 39 ft 5 in (12.01 m)
- Beam: 22 ft 9 in (6.93 m)
- Height: 16 ft 9 in (5.11 m) (skirt inflated)
- Propulsion: 1 × 900 shp (671 kW) Rolls-Royce Gnome turbine engine for lift and propulsion
- Speed: 70 knots (130 km/h; 81 mph) (Note: with 6 inch clearance under skirt)
- Range: 240 nmi (440 km) (3 hr 30 min) at 15,800 lb (7,200 kg) weight
- Capacity: 6,600 lb (3,000 kg) load including crew and fuel
- Troops: 16
- Notes: from Flight

The Saunders-Roe SR.N5 (or Warden class) was a medium-sized hovercraft which first flew in 1964. It has the distinction of being the first production-built hovercraft in the world.

A total of 14 SR.N5s were constructed. While Saunders-Roe had developed and produced the type, an additional seven vehicles were also manufactured by Bell Aerosystems under licence in the United States, designated as the Bell SK-5. A number of SK-5s were operated by the US military, this includes a number which became Patrol Air Cushion Vehicles (PACV), and saw action during the Vietnam War. The SR.N5 was subsequently developed into a "stretched" variant, which was designated as the SR.N6; this model had a much expanded payload capacity and went on to be produced in greater numbers than the SR.N5.

== Development ==
During the late 1950s and early 1960s, British inventor Sir Christopher Cockerell had, in cooperation with British aircraft manufacturer Saunders-Roe, developed a pioneering new form of transportation, in the form of the experimental SR.N1 vehicle, which became widely known as the hovercraft. By 1964, Saunders-Roe had commenced design work on multiple hovercraft designs; in addition to the relatively huge SR.N4 and studies into a prospective 2,000 ton freighter, there was also interest in developing smaller hovercraft as well.

In 1963, American manufacturer Bell Aerosystems successfully negotiated for the exclusive rights to market the SR.N5 in the North American market, as well as a licence to locally produce the type from Westland Aircraft, the parent company of Saunders-Roe. In North America, the type was marketed under the designation of Bell SK-5. Seven SR.N5s were directly sold to Bell; the type was militarised into the Patrol Air Cushion Vehicle (PACV) and adopted by the US military. Japanese conglomerate Mitsubishi also secured its own license to independently build the SR.N5.

Construction of the first SR.N5 occurred during 1963; it performed its first flight on 11 April 1964. That same month, the first SR.N5 commenced sea trials; as a result of experiences gathered from these early test runs, various changes were made to the design. Specifically, the fin area was increased while a new system for ducting plenum thrust was also adopted, which improved the craft's low speed handling.

In response to customer feedback, which showed interest in a stretched variant of the SR.N5 that would be capable of carrying a much greater payload, Saunders-Roe quickly commenced work on such a project. According to the company's own projections, an increase of the SR.N5's payload by 110 per cent would only reduce performance by 10 per cent as the increased payload was in part offset by the expanded cushion area, which meant that cushion pressure would not need to be substantially increased instead. To validate and demonstrate the concept, the ninth SR.N5 to have been produced was remanufactured into such a configuration, the first of the type to be lengthened in this manner. This stretched variant was subsequently designated SR.N6 and put into production.

== Design ==
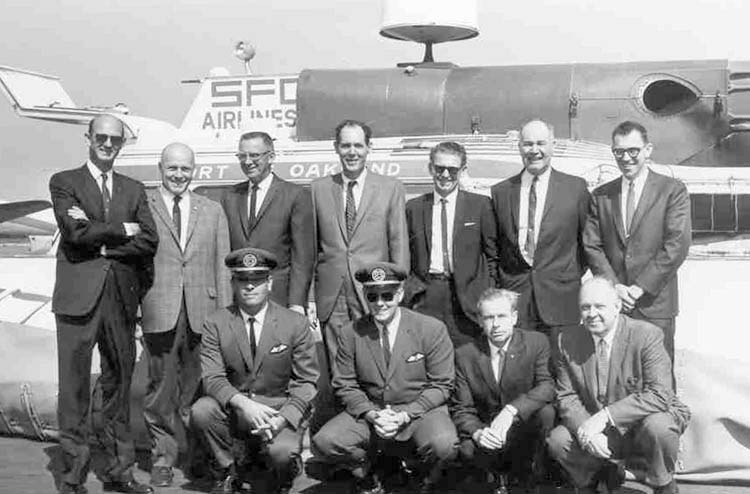
Crew and officials gathered in front of an SR.N5 in the livery of SFO Airlines

The SR.N5 is an early production hovercraft that was primarily designed for passenger service. In a typical civilian configuration, the SR.N5 possessed a gross weight of seven tonnes and could carry up to 20 passengers.

It was piloted from a forward-seated position at the front of the main passenger cabin. The pilot would exercise control over the direction of the craft via a series of control surfaces that was located immediately behind the variable pitch propeller. Early on, pilots were normally aviators who had been recruited from the Royal Air Force and Fleet Air Arm, however it has been claimed that experienced mariners would often be more skilled at operating the type, if not taking more time to adapt to its atypical form of propulsion, in part due to their familiarity at safely navigating within uncontrolled maritime environments. Around 20 per cent of the operating costs of the type have been attributed to maintenance of the 4 ft flexible skirt, which reportedly lasted for up to 500 hours, while similar cost levels have been reported for fuel.

The SR.N5 featured an improved skirt design over preceding hovercraft, featuring fingers and forward puff ports; these changes resulted in improved forward control and reduced skirt wear; fingers had not been present upon the initial version of the skirt used prior to 1966. The endurance of the fingers would be progressively improved over time, issues with salt spray negatively affecting both the engine and propeller were also encountered early on. An initial experience of some components having short overhaul lifespans or being unreliable was encountered during early days. During the early years of not only the SR.N6 but other hovercraft as well, the hovercraft skirt remained an unresolved area of difficulty during this era.

The SR.N5 was powered by a single marinised model of the Bristol Gnome turboshaft engine; this drove both a single rear-facing 9 ft (2.74 m) diameter 4-bladed Dowty Rotol variable-pitch propeller along with a 7 ft (2.13 m) diameter centrifugal lift fan. The Gnome engine was an expensive component for operators, leading to some establishing their own internal overhaul facilities and making arrangements with other Gnome operators, including the Royal Navy, to reduce costs from relying on costly services from Rolls-Royce Limited. American SK-5s were rebuilt to use the General Electric 7LM100-PJ102 gas turbine engine in place of the Gnome powerplant.

The Saunders-Roe SR.N6 (also known as the Winchester class) was based on the SR.N5 design to carry 110% more payload, making it more economical to run passenger services.

== Operational history ==
=== Civilian service ===
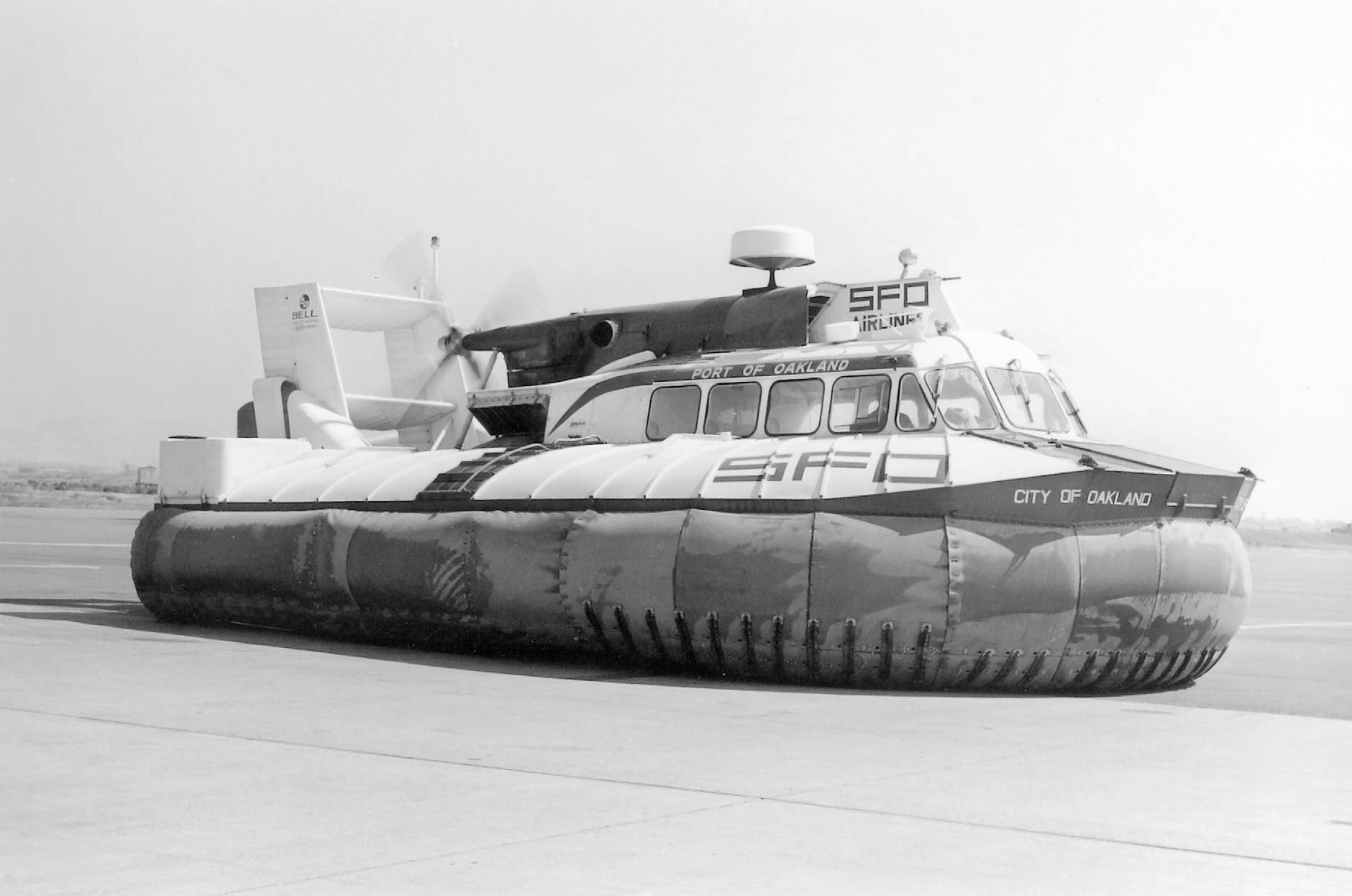
SK-5 City of Oakland operated by SFO Airlines

The SR.N5 was the world's first commercially successful hovercraft; it was placed onto various routes around the world.

At least two of the Bell-built SK-5s were placed into civilian service. San Francisco and Oakland Helicopter Airlines (SFO Airlines) operated the SK-5 for scheduled passenger services in the San Francisco Bay Area during the mid 1960s as a supplement to its helicopter airline service. According to a report compiled by the U.S. Department of Transportation, the Bay Area service, which was operated on a trial basis, had proved popular with the travelling public while the SK-5 itself was found to be well-suited to over-water routes; its operations were negatively impacted by high operating costs and reliability issues, as well as by regulations that prevented a variable fare structure being adopted.

=== Military service ===
A total of four SR.N5s entered service with the Interservice Hovercraft Trials Unit at RNAS Lee-on-Solent (HMS Daedalus) for trials and operational missions. Assigned the military aircraft registration numbers XT492, XT493, XT657, and XW246, these were deployed in the United Kingdom, Malaysia, Thailand, Aden, Libya, and Belgium. Two were subsequently converted to SR.N6s. XT492 is prominently featured in the final episode of the 1971 Doctor Who serial The Sea Devils.

Three Bell SK-5s saw service with the United States Navy, while another three with the United States Army; the type participated in the Vietnam War during the late 1960s. Following the conflict, the United States Coast Guard also operated multiple second-hand SK-5s on a trial basis.

The Boat Company of the Royal Brunei Malay Regiment (forerunner of the Royal Brunei Navy) and the Canadian Coast Guard each had one SR.N5.

== Preservation ==
By 2013, only a single SR.N5 was reportedly still intact; having been primarily used as an overseas demonstrator, it had been withdrawn during the 1980s and preserved at the Hovercraft Museum at Lee-on-the-Solent.
