= Yanks Air Museum =

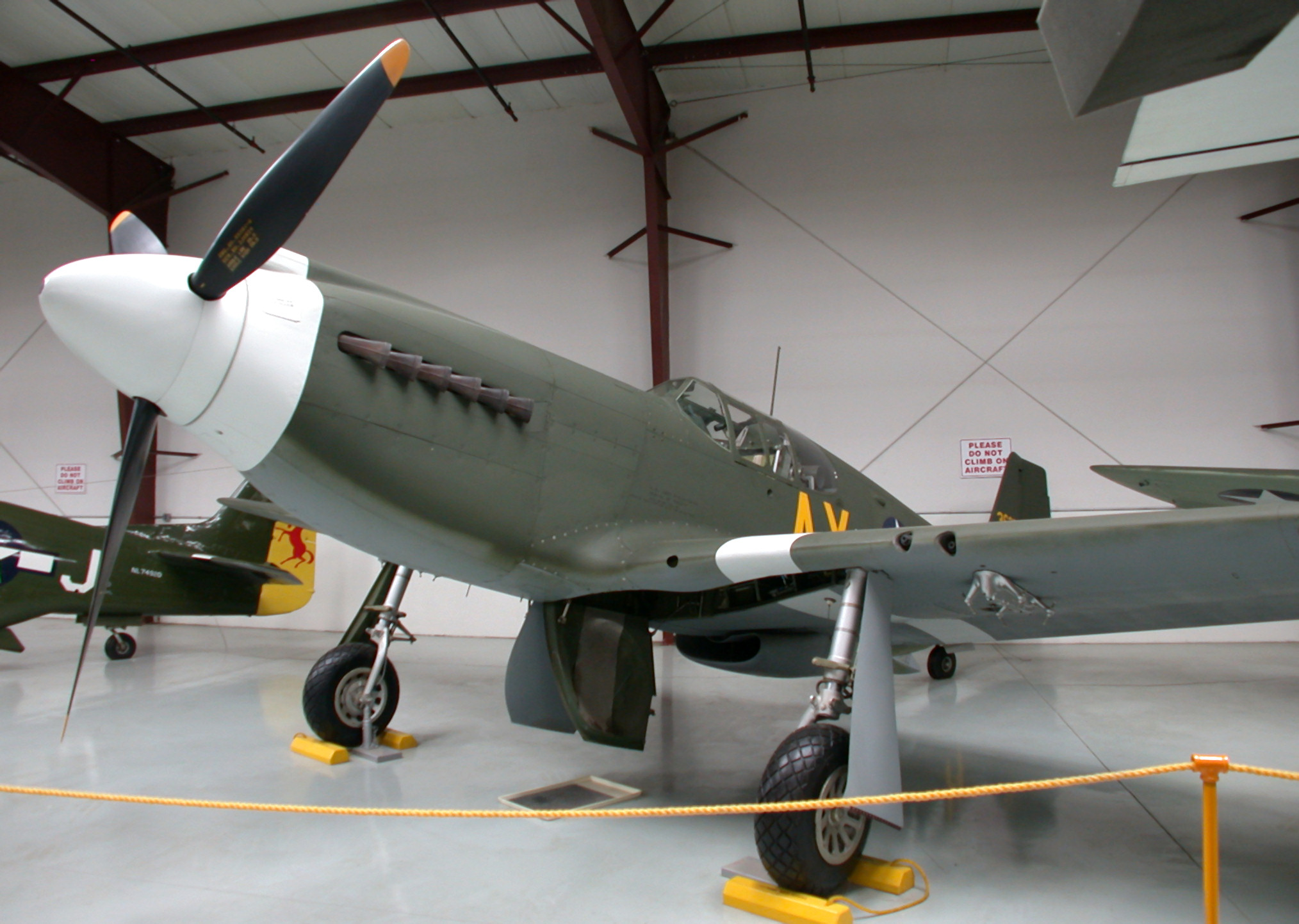
- Preserved North American P-51A Mustang on display

- Location in California
- Established: 1972
- Location: Chino Airport, Chino, California
- Coordinates: 33°58′45.36″N 117°38′47.81″W
- Type: Aviation museum
- Founder: Charles Nichols
- Website: yanksair.com

The Yanks Air Museum is an aviation museum located at Chino Airport in Chino, California, established in 1972.

== Mission ==
Yanks Air Museum is dedicated to exhibiting, preserving and restoring American aircraft and artifacts in order to show the evolution of American aviation.

== History ==
A pair of F-14s at the museum were seized by the U.S. Navy in 2007 over concerns that the aircraft were not sufficiently demilitarized before being acquired.

=== 2024 plane crash ===
On 15 June 2024, a twin-engine Lockheed 12 Electra owned by the museum crashed on take-off during a Father's Day event. Two people, including the operator of the museum, Frank Wright, were killed. According to the FAA, the National Transportation Safety Board will investigate the incident.

== Facilities ==
=== Chino facility and exhibits ===
Yanks Air Museum houses one of the largest and most historically significant collections of American aircraft including the World War II fighters, dive and torpedo bombers. The aircraft collection begins with the 1903 Wright Flyer (only replica in collection) and continues through the 1980s era represented by the F-15 Eagle, F-16 Fighting Falcon and Blue Angels F/A-18 Hornet. The collection exceeds 190 aircraft, with some being the last survivors of their type. Yanks restores all aircraft to airworthy condition, and in the restoration of these rare aircraft only original factory specifications and materials are used.

The Chino facility encompasses 176,000-square-foot (16,400 m^{2}) under roof and covers 10 acres (40,000 m^{2}). In addition to the display hangars, public access is permitted, on a supervised basis, to the main restoration hangar and boneyard where historic aircraft are in various stages of restoration. Some of the aircraft will not be flown due to their rarity, but are restored to fully airworthy condition.

=== Greenfield project ===
Work is now underway to create a second Yanks Air Museum facility in Greenfield, California. The facility will include 440 acres (1.8 km^{2}), the campus will be centered on the new 250,000-square-foot (23,000 m^{2}) museum facility. An active airport will support both museum flight operations and the private aviation needs of museum visitors and local aviators. Other features include an advanced-technology education center, a hotel and spa, winery, restaurants, service facilities, shops and a recreational vehicle park.

The project was announced in March 1992 and an environmental impact statement was presented to the county planning commission in 1997. However, it was delayed until 2002 when the museum reached an agreement with the county. The county then granted the museum a second extension on construction in 2008. After further delays, the museum announced it was restarting work on the project in 2019.

== Collection ==
A total of 190 aircraft are displayed, covering the period from 1903 through 1984 including the Inter-War period that includes the Ryan Brougham, American Eagle A-101 and Swallow TP.

Rare types on display from World War II include the P-51A Mustang, Curtiss P-40 Warhawk, Lockheed P-38 Lightning, P-47M Thunderbolt, North American B-25 Mitchell, Douglas SBD Dauntless, Curtiss SB2C Helldiver and Grumman F6F Hellcat. Many of them were built in Southern California.

Aircraft collection

- Aeronca C-2 Sport N647W
- Aeronca C-3 N15287
- Aeronca K Scout N18877
- Aeronca 65CA Super Chief N33853
- American Eagle A-101
- Beechcraft D-17S Staggerwing (UC-43)
- Beechcraft Bonanza
- Beechcraft BQM-126
- Bell AH-1F Cobra
- Bell OH-13E Sioux
- Bell P-39N Airacobra
- Bell P-63A Kingcobra
- Bell UH-1H Huey
- Bellanca 300-A Viking
- Boeing B-52F Stratofortress (cockpit section only)
- Brunner Winkle Bird BK
- Canadian Home Rotors Safari
- Canadair Sabre 6 (N/A F-86E)
- Canadair Sabre 6 (N/A F-86F)
- Cessna 172A Skyhawk
- Cessna AW
- Cessna T-37 Tweet
- Cessna T-50 Bobcat (UC-78)
- Chotia Gypsy
- Command-Aire 3C3
- Consolidated PB4Y-2 Privateer (Navy version of the B-24 Liberator)
- Consolidated PBY Catalina
- Convair C-131 Samaritan (R4Y-1)
- Convair F-106B Delta Dart
- Curtiss JN-4D Jenny
- Curtiss JNS Jenny
- Curtiss C-1 Robin
- Curtiss C-2 Robin
- Curtiss C-46F Commando
- Curtiss CW-1 Junior
- Curtiss O-52 Owl
- Curtiss P-40E Warhawk
- Curtiss SB2C-3 Helldiver
- Douglas A-4A Skyhawk
- Douglas A-4C Skyhawk
- Douglas A-4E Skyhawk
- Douglas AD-4N Skyraider
- Douglas C-47A Skytrain
- Douglas KA-3B Skywarrior
- Douglas SBD-4 Dauntless
- Ercoupe 415-D
- Fairchild C-123K Provider
- Fairchild PT-26 Cornell
- Fieseler 103 V-1 Rocket
- Fleet 7B Fawn
- General Dynamics F-16B Fighting Falcon
- General Dynamics F-111D Aardvark
- Grumman A-6E Intruder
- Grumman E-2C Hawkeye
- Grumman F-11F Tiger
- Grumman F-14A Tomcat
- Grumman F6F-3 Hellcat
- Grumman F6F-5 Hellcat
- Grumman F9F-2 Panther
- Grumman F9F-6 Panther
- Grumman F9F-8P Cougar
- Grumman FM-2 Wildcat
- Grumman G-21A Goose
- Grumman G-44 Widgeon
- Grumman HU-16B Albatross
- Grumman TBF-1C Avenger
- Hawker P.1101 Hunter T-7
- Hawker Siddeley GR.3 Harrier
- Kellett KD-1 Autogyro
- Kreider-Reisner C-2 Challenger
- Learjet 23
- Lockheed EC-121T Super Constellation
- Lockheed F-5G Lightning
- Lockheed F-80C Shooting Star
- Lockheed F-104A Starfighter
- Lockheed F-104C Starfighter
- Lockheed T-33A
- Lockheed UC-40D Electra Junior
- LTV A-7B Corsair II
- Martin 4-0-4 (cockpit section)
- McCulloch HUM-1 (MC-4A)
- McDonnell Douglas F-15A Eagle
- McDonnell Douglas F-4C Phantom II
- McDonnell Douglas F-4J/S Phantom II
- McDonnell Douglas F/A-18 Hornet
- McDonnell Douglas F/A-18 Hornet (cockpit section)
- Moth Aircraft DH.60GMW Gipsy Moth
- Noorduyn Norseman
- Naval Aircraft Factory N3N-3
- North American B-25J Mitchell
- North American F-100C Super Sabre
- North American FJ-1 Fury
- North American P-51A Mustang
- North American P-51D Mustang
- North American T-6D/SNJ-5 Texan
- Northrop T-38A Talon
- Northrop F-5 Tiger II
- Piasecki HUP-3 Retriever
- Porterfield 35-70 Flyabout
- Republic F-84E Thunderjet
- Republic F-84F Thunderstreak
- Republic F-105D Thunderchief
- Republic P-47D Thunderbolt
- Republic YP-47M Thunderbolt
- Ryan B-1 Brougham N6956
- Schultz ABC
- Schweizer SGS 2-12
- Sikorsky CH-3E
- Sikorsky HH-52A Seaguard
- Sikorsky R-4B Hoverfly
- Sikorsky S-58B
- Standard J-1
- Stearman 4D
- Stearman YPT-9B Cloudboy
- Stinson L-5E Sentinel
- Swallow TP
- Taylor J-2 Cub
- Thomas-Morse S-4C Scout
- Travel Air 2000
- Vickers PBY-5 Super Catalina
- Vought F4U-4 Corsair
- Vought OS2U-3 Kingfisher
- Vultee BT-13B Valiant
- Waco 10 GXE
- Waco CG-4A Hadrian
- Waco UEC
- Wright Flyer (replica)
- Yokosuka MXY-7 Ohka 11

== See also ==
- Planes of Fame Air Museum, another air museum located at Chino Airport
- List of aerospace museums
