= Planes of Fame Air Museum =

Aviation museum in Arizona and California

Planes of Fame
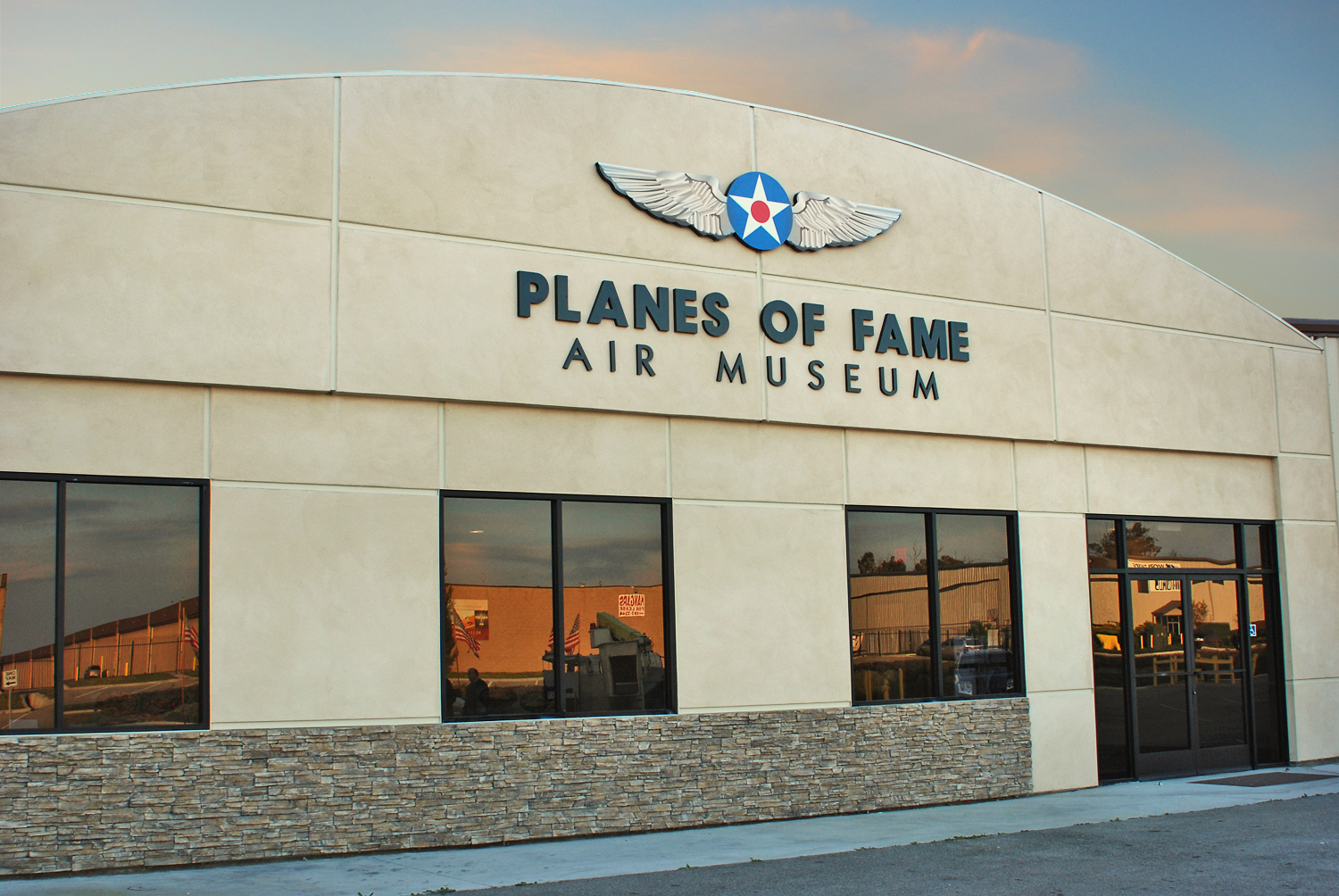

- Location within the Los Angeles metropolitan area
- Established: 12 January 1957
- Location: Chino, California
- Coordinates: 33°58′53″N 117°38′23″W
- Type: Aviation museum
- Collection size: 150+ planes
- Founder: Edward T. Maloney
- President: Steve Hinton
- Website: www.planesoffame.org

Planes of Fame Air Museum is an aviation museum at Chino Airport in Chino, California.

== History ==
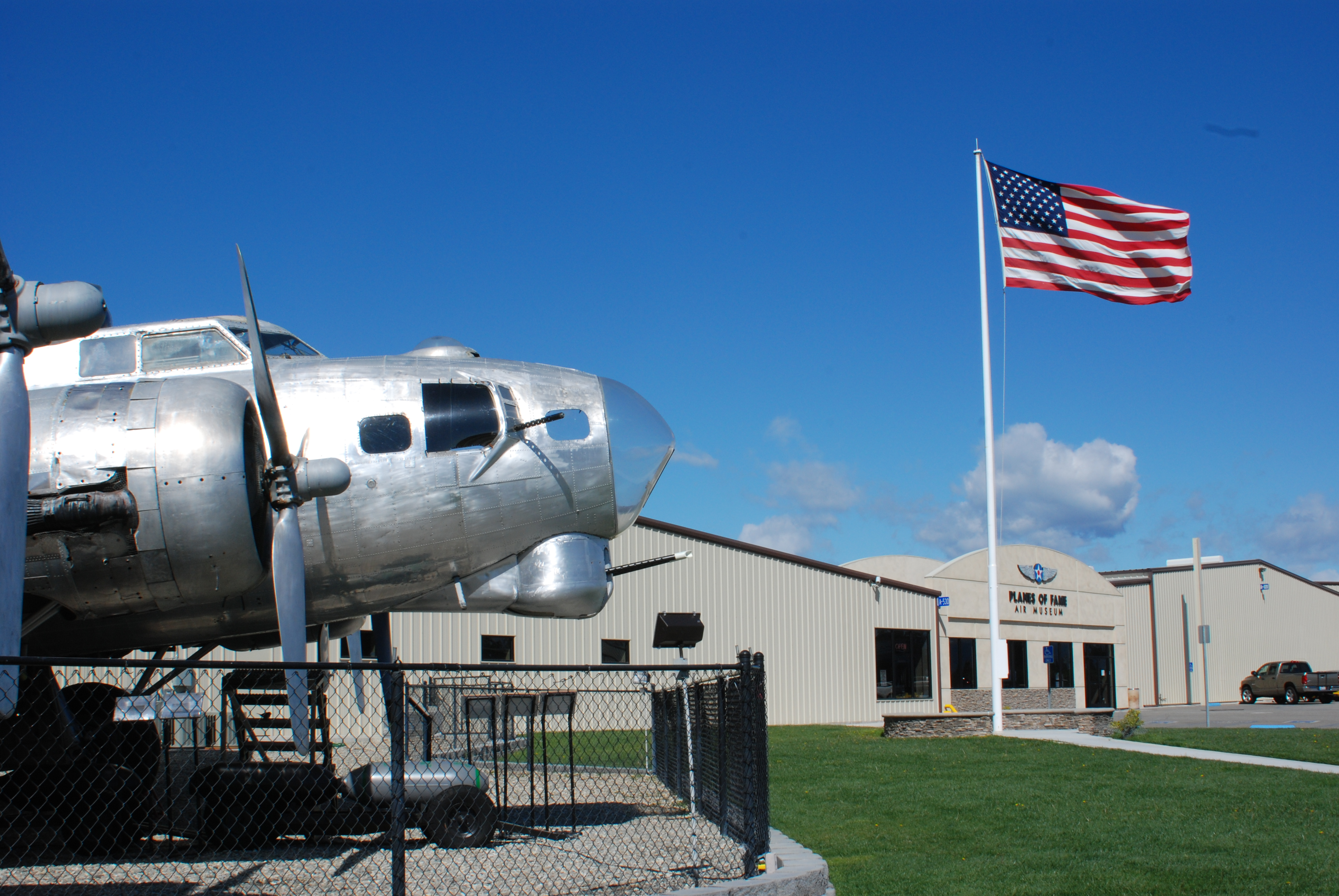
The museum's Boeing B-17G Flying Fortress undergoing restoration to flight.

=== Establishment in Claremont ===
The Air Museum was founded by Edward T. Maloney on 12 January 1957, in Claremont, California, to save historically important aircraft. By February 1959, when it acquired the last F-86A in the California Air National Guard, the museum had 14 aircraft. As the museum quickly acquired airplanes, its location proved too small and in 1960 it approached Long Beach, California about leasing a hangar at Long Beach Municipal Airport. Two years later, it suggested relocating to Torrance Airport.

=== Move to Ontario ===
By 1962, the museum's collection of 72 aircraft had outgrown its original home. In February of that year, it began renovating a hangar leased by the Southern California Aircraft Corporation at Ontario International Airport in Ontario, California and made a request to the city to sublease the building. The city was skeptical, questioning the museum's quality, but eventually approved the request in early April after the museum agreed to maintain the property. A month later the flyable portion of its collection started arriving there. (Note: The original location was maintained to display the non-flying aircraft. However, plans called for it to be eventually vacated.) Following an initial opening to the public in July, the museum held a grand opening on 3 August 1963 with 27 aircraft on display.

After the expiry of SCAC's lease in 1966, the museum offered to take over the building. The city tentatively approved a one to three-year lease that June.

=== Move to Buena Park ===
In 1970, redevelopment of the airport at Ontario forced the museum to move again.

Three years prior, in December 1967, James Brucker, who had accrued a collection of vehicles from his business supplying Hollywood productions, opened the Movieland: Cars of the Stars Museum in Oxnard, California. Two years after that, construction was begun on a new location in Buena Park, California near Knott's Berry Farm. Plans called for the facility, called Movieland: Cars of the Stars and Planes of Fame Museum, to feature two 50,000-square-foot (4,600 m^{2}) buildings side by side and with a common entrance. The museum's 25 non-flyable aircraft were disassembled and trucked to the new building, which opened on 5 June 1970. (Note: This should not be confused with the similarly named, but unrelated, Movieland of the Air Museum which reopened at the Orange County Airport later that same month.)

Meanwhile, the airworthy aircraft were moved to Chino Airport, about 30 miles (48 km) away. (Note: This airport was formerly the home of Cal-Aero Academy, an Army Air Corps facility that trained more than 10,000 pilots before the end of World War II.) The last aircraft left the property on 12 November 1970.

=== Consolidation at Chino ===
When Movie World closed in 1973, the name "Planes of Fame" was transferred, along with the static planes, to the flying collection at Chino. (Note: By April 1973, the name of the combined museum had changed from "Movieland" to "Movie World".) (Note: The museum received a permit to allow it to rent its half of the building for industrial use in November 1974.) The following year, when the museum reopened, it was combined with the old "Air Museum" name to become the Planes of Fame Air Museum. After first leasing a building at the airport, it presented a plan to construct a 15,000 sq ft (1,400 m^{2}) hangar in October 1981. Around the same time, the museum began restoration on its N-9M flying wing.

In the early 1980s, Robert Pond was establishing Planes of Fame East at the Flying Cloud Airport in Eden Prairie, Minnesota.

A hangar to display the museum's Japanese aircraft was completed in December 1982 and opened in April 1984. The first step in a three phase plan, phase two involved an additional hangar and phase three would see a new office complex.

The museum imported an An-2 from Hungary in 1987 and a MiG-15 and MiG-17 from Poland in 1988. However, the following January, after the aircraft had passed through customs and been placed on display, they were determined to have been acquired in violation of government regulations about imports of military equipment from certain countries. The museum stated that it was unaware of the restrictions and began a petition to keep the airplanes. As a result of Congressional action, the museum received an exemption in November.

Steve Hinton became president and CEO of the museum in 1994, taking over from Ed Maloney. At the same time, a new foundation was formed to provide direction.

As more aircraft were restored and the collection grew, an additional display facility was opened in 1995 at Valle, Arizona. Located halfway between Williams, Arizona, and the south rim of the Grand Canyon, it houses more than 40 of the museum's aircraft, many flyable.

Planes of Fame East closed in 1997, with Bob Pond's personal collection being transferred to the Palm Springs Air Museum.

=== Expansion at Chino ===
An agreement signed in February 2000 allowed the museum to grow to 9.53 acres (0.0386 km^{2}). It subsequently announced plans for a 15,000 sq ft (1,400 m^{2}) hangar as the first part of a four phase expansion.

The Chino facility opened its 9,000 sq ft (840 m^{2}) Enterprise Hangar in 2002. Designed to resemble the hangar deck of a World War II aircraft carrier, it contains a number of items from the USS Enterprise (CV-6) donated by members of her crew and flight squadrons. It also houses many aircraft typical of those that served on the Enterprise during the war.

By the end of 2003, the third phase had begun with the construction of a third, 15,000 sq ft (1,400 m^{2}) hangar.

The Chino facility was further expanded in 2004–08, adding two new hangars, new offices, a gift shop, library, and the Hands-On Aviation youth education center. Display areas for jets and other aircraft of the Korean War, Cold War, and Vietnam War were added. In October 2009, another new hangar was dedicated, this one built by the 475th Fighter Group to store their memorabilia and house the museum's rare Lockheed P-38 Lightning.

An F-14 that the museum had received in trade from the Yanks Air Museum was seized by the U.S. Navy in March 2007. The aircraft had been insufficiently demilitarized when they were sold to a salvage company and there were concerns that an Iranian front company may have attempted to obtain parts from them.

The museum was the subject of a lawsuit brought by Yanks Air Museum and other tenants at Chino Airport in 2016 who argued that the museum's airshow interfered with other flight operations.

The Valle facility closed during the COVID Pandemic and has not reopened as of 2024.

=== Expansion to Santa Maria ===
The museum announced plans to open a new location at the Santa Maria Public Airport. It received planning permission for the 208,962 sq ft (19,413.2 m^{2}) facility in December 2024. It broke ground on the new location in February 2025.

== Exhibits ==
=== 475th Fighter Group ===
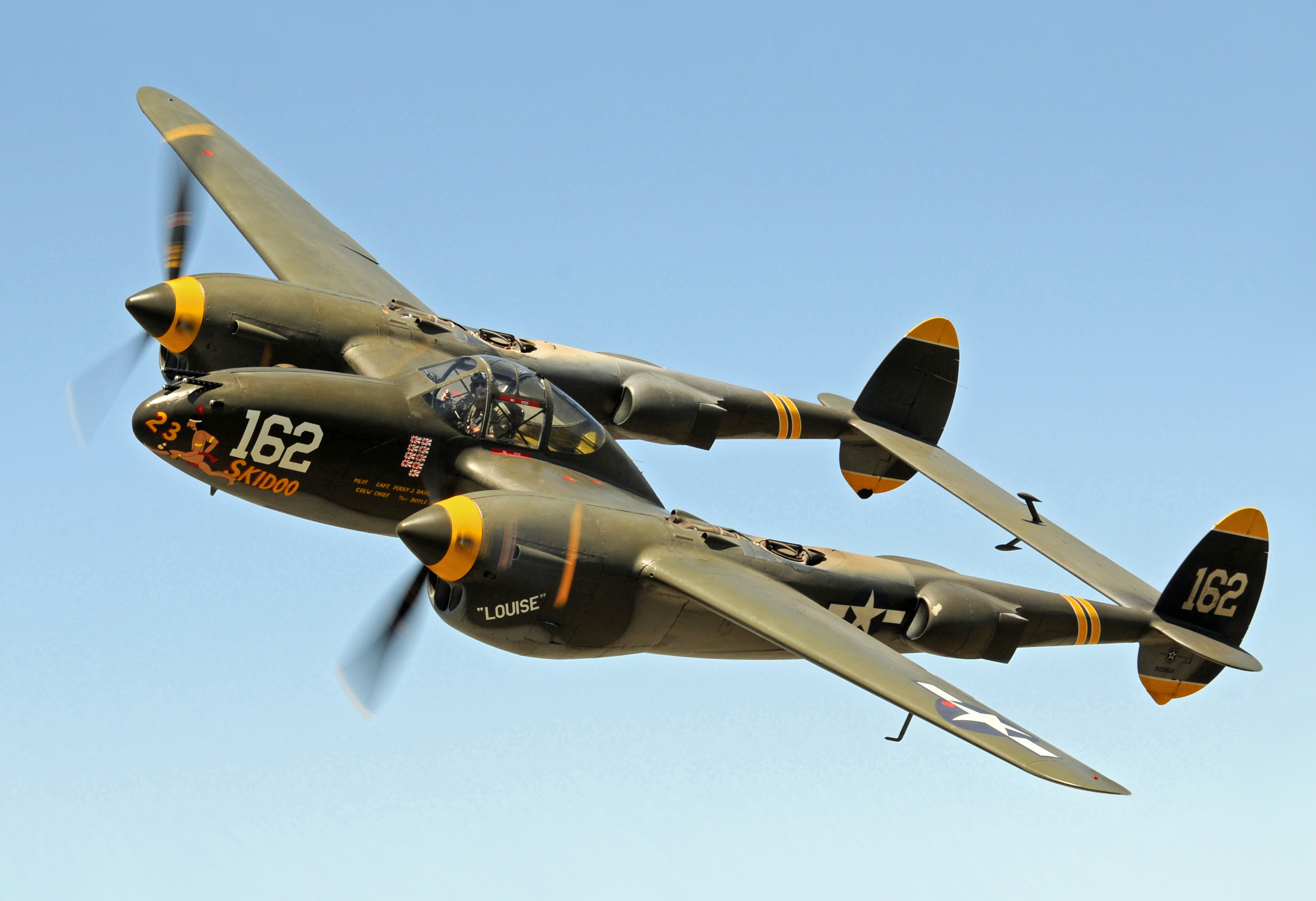
The museum's P-38 Lightning

In the late 1990s, members of the 475th Fighter Group (Satan's Angels) established a permanent home for the artifacts, photographs, records and memories of their U.S. Army Air Forces unit, which recorded 562 victories, received two Presidential Unit Citations, and produced 42 "Aces" in the South Pacific combat area. It was the first all-Lockheed P-38 group and the only one formed overseas in Australia.

This new museum was dedicated in October 1997, at the expanding March Field Air Museum complex at the former March Air Force Base near Riverside, California, where the first test flight of the P-38 took place. The March Field Museum chronicles the history of U.S. military aviation since 1917. Legally known as The 475th Fighter Group Historical Foundation, Inc., the museum was housed in a 1,250-square-foot (116 m^{2}) modern steel building reminiscent of a World War II military hangar.

In 2005, the museum's board decided to merge the museum into The Air Museum Planes of Fame. As of 2015, a 3,600 sq ft (330 m^{2}) hangar at Planes of Fame was under construction for the 475th.

== Collection ==
=== Aircraft ===
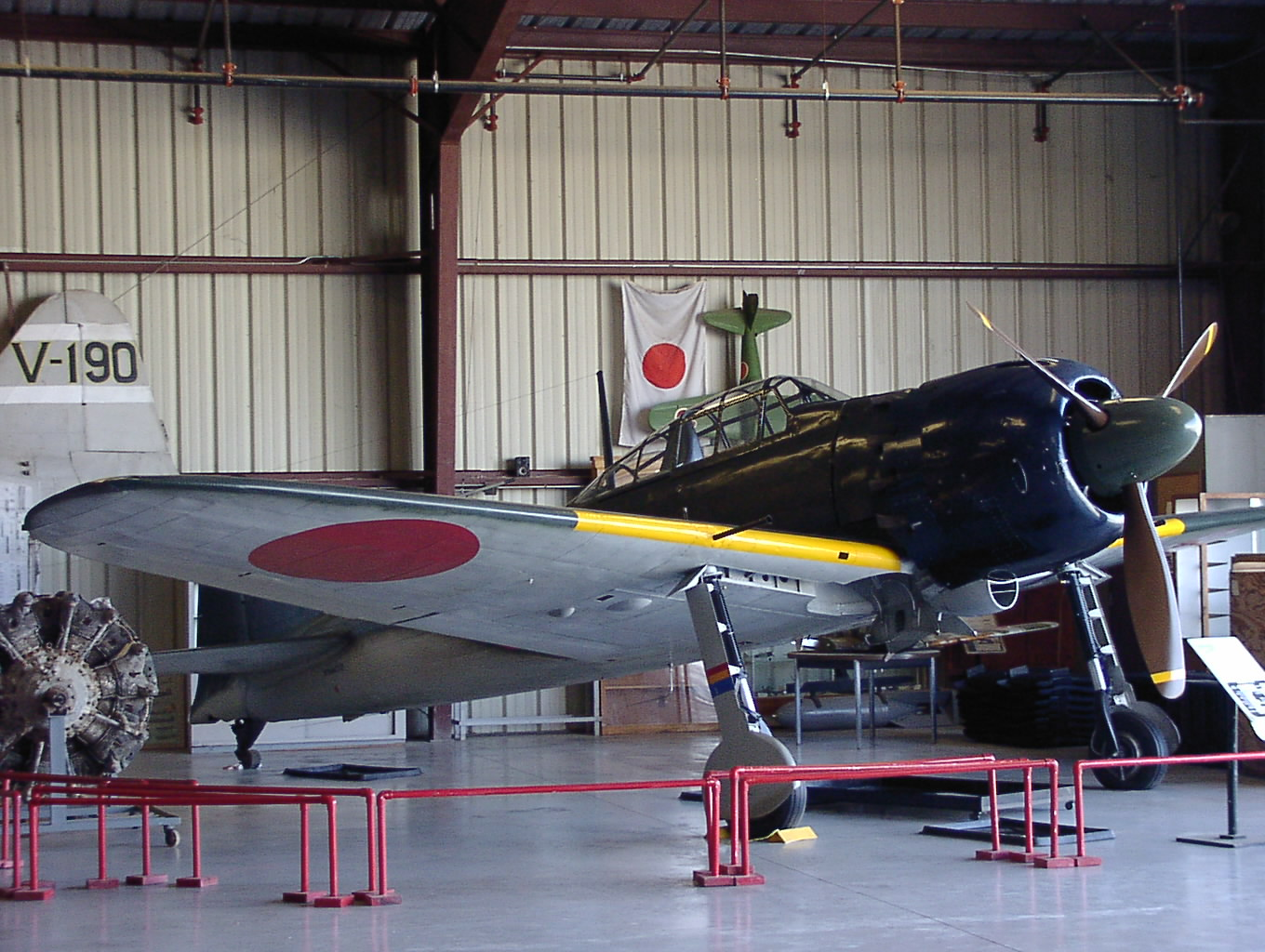
The museum's Mitsubishi A6M5 Zero

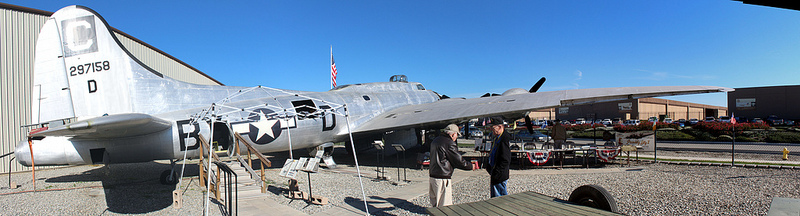
In January 2013, the restoration continued.

The museum's collection of Japanese aircraft is the largest of its type in the world. This collection includes the only authentic airworthy example of the Japanese Mitsubishi A6M Zero fighter in the world, with its original Sakae engine and an Aichi D3A featured in the movie Tora! Tora! Tora!.

Many other rare aircraft are maintained in flyable condition, such as a North American P-51A Mustang, a Boeing P-26A Peashooter, a Lockheed P-38J Lightning, and a Republic P-47G Thunderbolt.

Many of the museum's roughly 150 aircraft were built in Southern California, and about 30 are flyable. Others are under restoration in the full-time restoration facility.

As of May 2021 the complete collection consists of:

- Aero Industries Shoestring Midget Racer
- Aero L-29 Delfín – two
- Aichi D3A2 Val
- Bachem Ba 349 Natter – replica
- Bede BD-5 Micro
- Beech UC-45 Expeditor
- Bell P-39N Airacobra
- Bell X-2 – replica
- Bell YP-59A Airacomet
- Boeing B-17G Flying Fortress
- Boeing B-50A Superfortress – Lucky Lady II fuselage only
- Boeing FB-5 Hawk
- Boeing P-12E
- Boeing P-26A Peashooter
- Bristol F.2b Brisfit – two replicas
- Canadair CT-133 Silver Star
- Cessna 182D Skylane
- Cessna A-37 Dragonfly
- Cessna L-19 Bird Dog
- Colomban MC-12 Cri-Cri
- Convair CV-240-1
- Culver PQ-14B Cadet
- Curtiss C-46A Commando
- Curtiss Model D Pusher - replica
- Curtiss P-40N Warhawk
- Curtiss R3C-2 – replica
- de Havilland F.3 Vampire
- de Havillland FB.6 Vampire
- Deperdussin Coupe Schneider – replica
- Douglas A-4C Skyhawk
- Douglas A-4E Skyhawk
- Douglas A-4L Skyhawk
- Douglas AD-4N Skyraider
- Douglas C-47 Skytrain
- Douglas D-558-2 Skyrocket
- Douglas RB-26C Invader
- Douglas SBD-5 Dauntless
- EKW C-3605
- Erco 415-C Ercoupe
- Erco 415-E Ercoupe
- Fairchild 24-C8F Argus
- Fieseler Fi 156 D-1 Storch
- Fieseler Fi 103 – replica
- Fleet Model 2
- Focke-Wulf Fw 190 A-9
- Fokker DR.1 Dreidecker - replica
- Folland T1 Gnat
- General Motors TBM-3E Avenger
- Gloster Meteor T7
- Gloster Mk.4 Meteor
- Goodyear GZ-20 – gondola
- Granville Brothers R-1 Gee Bee – replica
- Grumman F-11F-1 Tiger
- Grumman F7F-3N Tigercat
- Grumman F8F-2 Bearcat
- Grumman F9F-5P Panther
- Grumman G-32A - replica
- Grumman OV-1A Mohawk
- Hanriot HD-1 Scout
- Hanson WH-1 Sumpn Else
- Hawker Mk. 58 Hunter
- Heinkel He 100 D-1 – replica
- Heinkel He 162 A-1 Volksjager
- Heinkel He 178 – replica
- Hiller H-23D Raven
- Hispano HA-1112-M1L Buchon
- Hispano HA-200A Saeta – two
- Horten H.IV
- Howard DGA-5 - replica
- Laister-Kauffman TG-4A
- Lancair 235
- Lockheed C-60 Lodestar
- Lockheed F-104G Starfighter
- Lockheed L-18 Lodestar
- Lockheed P-38J Lightning
- Lockheed P-80A Shooting Star
- Lockheed T-33A Shooting Star
- LTV A-7A Corsair II
- Luscombe 8A Silvaire
- Macchi M.39 - replica
- Martin 4-0-4
- Messerschmitt Bf 108 B-1 Taifun
- Messerschmitt Bf 109 E-7
- Messerschmitt Bf 109 G-10/U4
- Messerschmitt Me 163 Komet - replica
- Midget Racer Mr. D
- Mikoyan-Gurevich MiG-15 bis – two
- Mikoyan-Gurevich MiG-15UTI
- Mikoyan-Gurevich MiG-17F
- Mikoyan-Gurevich MiG-21R
- Miles & Atwood Special - replica
- Miss Cosmic Wind Midget Racer
- Mitsubishi A6M5 Zero
- Mitsubishi J2M3 Raiden
- Mitsubishi J8M1 Shusui
- Mong MS1 Sport
- Mooney M-18C Mite
- Nieuport 17 – replica
- North American AT-6D Texan
- North American B-25J Mitchell
- North American F-100D Super Sabre
- North American F-86E Sabre
- North American F-86F Sabre
- North American F-86H Sabre
- North American FJ-3 Fury
- North American L-17A Navion
- North American O-47A
- North American P-51A Mustang
- North American P-51D Mustang – three
- North American T-28B Trojan
- North American T-28C Trojan
- North American T-2A Buckeye
- Northrop Alpha
- Northrop F-89J Scorpion
- Oldfield Baby Great Lakes
- Pilatus P2-06
- Piper L-4H Grasshopper
- Pitts S-2B Special
- PZL-Mielec TS-11 bis B Iskra
- Rand Robinson KR-1
- Republic F-84B Thunderjet
- Republic F-84F Thunderstreak
- Republic P-47G Thunderbolt
- Republic RF-84K Thunderflash
- Rider R-4 Firecracker
- Rider R-6 8 Ball
- Rutan Long-EZ
- Ryan FR-1 Fireball
- Seversky AT-12 Guardsman
- Sopwith Pup - replica
- Stearman Model 75 Kaydet
- Stearman PT-17 Kaydet
- Stinson AT-19 Reliant
- Stinson L-13A Grasshopper
- Stinson L-5G Sentinel
- Supermarine S.6B – replica
- Team Mini-Max 1600R
- Vought F4U-1A Corsair
- Vought F8U-1 Crusader
- Vultee BT-13B Valiant
- Vultee BT-15 – Movie Conversion Aichi D3Y Val
- Wright 1903 Kitty Hawk Flyer – replica
- Yakovlev Yak-18A
- Yakovlev Yak-3U - replica
- Yokosuka D4Y3 Suisei
- Yokosuka MXY-7 Ohka

The museum was previously home to the world's only surviving Northrop N-9M flying wing, which was destroyed in a crash on April 22, 2019.

=== Ground vehicles ===
The Military Vehicle Corps, often referred to as the Motor Pool, is a small group within the Planes of Fame Air Museum. The Military Vehicles in their collection are primarily from World War II and are maintained and operated by a group of Museum volunteers. These vehicles are used in parades, public events (e.g. Marching Thru History), and WWII re-enactments. The following vehicles are some of those that are on display at Chino.

- M4A1 Sherman Tank
- 1941 WC-54 Dodge Ambulance
- GMC CCKW

== Events ==
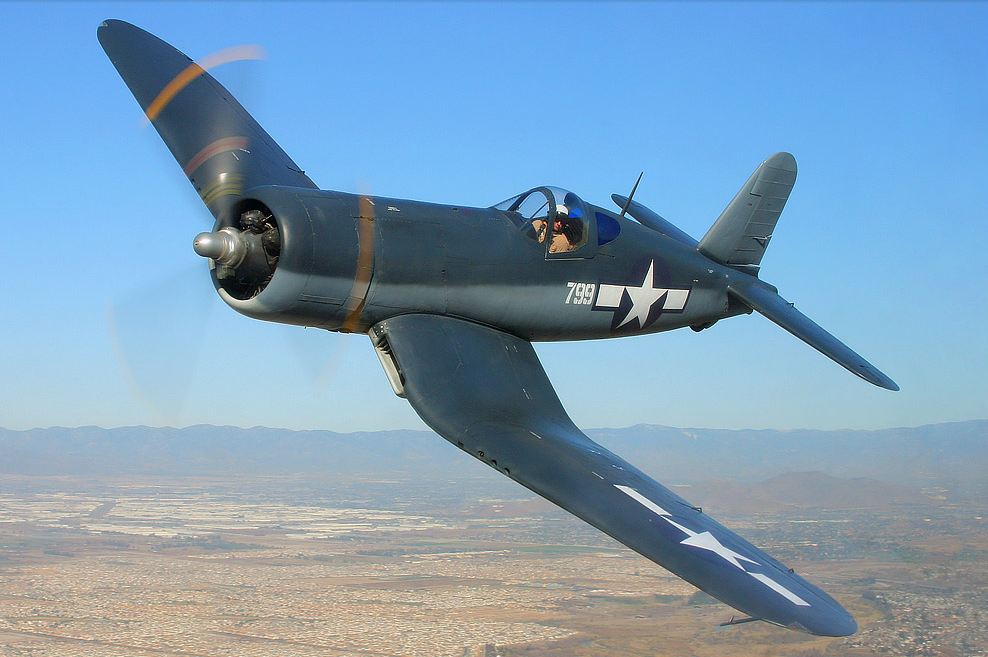
The museum's Vought F4U Corsair, a WWII combat veteran.

The museum holds a monthly mini-airshow around a certain theme, such as: "World War I Aviation", "Experimental Aircraft", "Korean War Aviation", "Airplanes In The Movies" and "Naval Aviation". Each mini-airshow starts with one or more talks or seminars given by people involved with the featured aircraft (such as combat pilots), followed by a flight demonstration of two or three aircraft related to that day's theme. Beginning in 2021 the museum changed the name of these monthly events to "Hangar Talk".

The museum flies all of its airworthy aircraft, as well as many other warbirds visiting from other museums or brought by private owners, during its annual airshow. This event is the largest gathering of warbirds in the western US. Many aircraft are rare or one of a kind. In 2022, the museum began a new event with the gathering of military vehicles and historical reenactors named "Wheels, Tracks, and Wings" held on June 18. The event expanded into a two-day event in 2023. For 2024, the event was renamed "Wings, Tracks, and Wheels" to be held on May 4–5 with over ten warbird aircraft expected to fly, special presentations, historical reenactors, military vehicles, and concluding with a M4A1 Sherman Tank demonstration.

== See also ==
- List of aerospace museums
