= Bến Lức =

Bến Lức Phường Bến Lức
- Ward
- Location within Vietnam
- Coordinates: 10°38′24″N 106°29′14″E
- Country: Vietnam
- Region: Mekong Delta
- Province: Tây Ninh
- Time zone: UTC+7 (UTC + 7)

Bến Lức is a ward (phường) of Tây Ninh Province, Vietnam.
