= 2005 in aviation =

This is a list of aviation-related events from 2005.

== Events ==
- The Dutch Transport Safety Board merges with Dutch military accident investigation authorities to for the Dutch Safety Board, which takes over the responsibility for aviation accident investigations in the Netherlands.
- The flight operations of Lauda Air, a wholly owned subsidiary of Austrian Airlines, merge with those of Austrian Airlines. The brand "Lauda Air" survives for charter flights operated by the Austrian Airlines Group.

=== January ===
- 18 January – The world's largest passenger plane, the Airbus A380, is unveiled in an elaborate ceremony in France.
- 29 January – Nonstop flights between mainland China and Taiwan take off for the first time since 1949.
- 30 January – A Royal Air Force Lockheed C-130K Hercules C3 is shot down in Iraq a few minutes after takeoff from Baghdad, killing all 10 people on board. It is the British military's largest loss of life in a single incident during Operation Telic.
- 31 January – The Belgium-based airline BelgiumExel ceases operations.

=== February ===
- 3 February – Kam Air Flight 904, a Boeing 737-242, crashes on Chaperi Mountain in Afghanistan's Pamir Mountains at an altitude of 11,000 feet (3,400 meters) during a heavy snowstorm, killing all 104 people on board.
- 9–13 February – The Aero-India show takes place in Bangalore, India.
- 17 February
  - Opening of a new international airport in Nagoya, Japan. It is the third Japanese international airport.
  - Several airlines will have to pay heavy compensation to passengers for flight delays and cancellations under a European regulation.
- 20 February – British Airways Flight 268, a Boeing 747-436 with 370 people on board, suffers an engine fire during climbout from Los Angeles International Airport in Los Angeles, California. The crew shuts down the engine and opts to continue the flight to its destination, Manchester in the United Kingdom, on three engines. Although the aircraft arrives safely, controversy ensues when the U.S. Federal Aviation Administration threatens to fine British Airways for flying an "unairworthy" plane across the Atlantic Ocean.

=== March ===
- Lufthansa acquired their first 11% of Swiss International Air Lines
- 5 March – Steve Fossett completes the first non-stop, solo circumnavigation of the world in the Virgin Atlantic GlobalFlyer, completing the trip in 67 hours and 2 minutes.
- 6 March – The rudder of Air Transat Flight 961, an Airbus A310-308 carrying 271 people bound from Varadero, Cuba, to Quebec City, Canada, detaches in flight. The aircraft returns to Varadero and makes an emergency landing at Juan Gualberto Gomez Airport without injury to anyone on board.
- 11 March
  - Jetsgo ceases all operations and declares bankruptcy protection.
  - China's first private airline, Okay Airlines, makes its maiden revenue flight.
- 14 March – TAP Portugal joins the Star Alliance.
- 16 March – Regional Airlines Flight 9288, an Antonov An-24RV (NATO reporting name "Coke") carrying oil workers on a non-scheduled passenger flight, crashes five kilometers (3.1 miles) from the runway while on approach to Varandey Airport in Nenetskiy Avtonomnyy Okrug, Russia, after the crew allows the aircraft's speed to drop and nose to rise until it stalls. The plane strikes a hill, crashes, and burns, killing 28 of the 52 people aboard (26 of the 45 passengers and two of the seven crew members). Malfunctioning airspeed and angle-of-attack indicators may have contributed to the crash.
- 17 March – A judge finds millionaire Sikh businessman Ripudaman Singh Malik and sawmill worker Ajaib Singh Bagri not guilty of conspiracy and murder in the 1985 Air India bombing that killed 329 people.
- 23 March – Baku Cargo Terminal was opened and started to operate.
- 28 March – Chicago Express Airlines, also known as ATA Connection, ceased operations.

=== April ===
- 2 April – A Royal Australian Navy Westland WS-61 Sea King helicopter engaged in humanitarian assistance after an earthquake on Sumatra crashes on a sports field on the island of Nias in Indonesia. The crash kills nine – six RAN members and three members of the Royal Australian Air Force (RAAF) – of the 11 personnel aboard; one RAN member and one RAAF member aboard the helicopter are injured but survive.
- 14 April – Flying a Eurocopter AS350 Écureuil at Istres, France, French pilot Didier Delsalle, a Eurocopter test pilot, sets three time-to-climb records for helicopters in the take-off-weight class of 1,000 to 1,750 kg (2,200 to 3,860 lb), climbing to 3,000 meters (9,800 feet) in 2 minutes 21 seconds, to 6,000 meters (20,000 feet) in 5 minutes 6 seconds, and to 9,000 meters (30,000 feet) in 9 minutes 26 seconds,
- 19 April – The middle section of the Obelisk of Axum is repatriated from Italy to Ethiopia by air from Leonardo da Vinci–Fiumicino Airport to Axum Airport in an Antonov An-124 Ruslan, the largest and heaviest piece of air freight ever carried up to this date.
- 21 April – Oneworld becomes the first airline alliance to enable its customers to fly throughout its members' network on electronic tickets only, with the completion of interline electronic ticketing (IET) links between all its member airlines.
- 27 April – The Airbus A380, the world's largest passenger airliner, made its maiden flight.

=== May ===
- 3 May – Airwork Flight 23, a Fairchild Swearingen Metroliner crashes in Taranaki, New Zealand, killing both crew members.
- 7 May – Australia experiences its worst air disaster since December 1968 when the Fairchild Swearingen SA227-DC Metro 23 VH-TFU, operated by Aerotropics, crashes into the ridge known as South Pap while on approach to land at Lockhart River Airport in Queensland, killing all 15 people on board.
- 13 May - Israel's Civil Aviation Administration becomes the Civil Aviation Authority of Israel.
- 14 May – The first helicopter landing on the summit of Mount Everest takes place, as French pilot Didier Delsalle, a Eurocopter test pilot, lands an unmodified Eurocopter AS350 B3 helicopter there at an altitude of 29,030 feet (8,850 meters) in 75-mph (121-km/h) winds. The landing and takeoff set the world records for the highest helicopter landing and takeoff in history. He repeats the feat following day.
- 29 May – Air Italy begins flight operations. Its inaugural flight is from Turin, Italy, to Budapest, Hungary.

=== June ===
- 4 June – Iraqi Airways makes its first scheduled domestic flight since the fall of Saddam Hussein's regime in 2003, carrying 100 passengers from Baghdad to Basra in a Boeing 737-200.
- 11 June – The Pacific Islands Civil Aviation Safety and Security Treaty, ratified by several member states of the Pacific Islands Forum, enters into force. It formally confirms the Pacific Aviation Safety Office, which had been formed informally in 2002.
- 17 June – The CarterCopter becomes the first rotorcraft to achieve mu-1 (μ=1), an equal ratio of airspeed to rotor tip speed, but it is badly damaged in a crash during a subsequent flight on the same day.

=== July ===
- 2–3 July – Steve Fossett and co-pilot Mark Rebholz recreate the first direct crossing of the Atlantic by the British team of John Alcock and Arthur Whitten-Brown on 14 June 1919 in a Vickers Vimy biplane.
- 16 July – Minutes after takeoff from Malabo International Airport outside Malabo on Bioko in Equatorial Guinea, an Equatorial Express Airlines Antonov An-24 (NATO reporting name "Coke") crashes into the side of a mountain near Baney, killing all 60 people on board.
- 26 July – The Irish airline EUjet ceases operations. It is placed into administration on 28 July.
- 27 July – United Eagle Airlines – the future Chengdu Airlines – begins flight operations.
- 29 July – The United States Army awards a contract for the purchase of 368 Armed Reconnaissance Helicopters (ARH) to Bell Helicopter Textron.
- 30 July – John Garang de Mabior, serving as both the first President of Southern Sudan and the First Vice President of Sudan, dies in the crash of the Ugandan presidential Mil Mi-172 helicopter in a mountain range in southern Sudan.

=== August ===
- 2 August – Air France Flight 358, an Airbus A340-300 with 309 people on board, bursts into flames after skidding off the end of a runway after landing at Toronto Pearson International Airport in Toronto, Ontario, Canada. The plane comes to a stop next to Highway 401. Everyone on board survives, although 43 are injured.
- 6 August – Tuninter Flight 1153, an ATR 72 heading from Italy to Tunisia, crashes into the Mediterranean Sea, killing 16 of the 39 people on board.
- 10 August – Copterline Flight 103, a Sikorsky S-76C+ helicopter flying from Helsinki, Finland, to Tallinn, Estonia, crashes into Tallinn Bay and sinks, killing all 14 people on board.
- 14 August – Helios Airways Flight 522: The Boeing 737-300 Olympia; crashes into a mountain north of Marathon and Varnavas, Greece. Killing all 121 passengers and crew.
- 16 August – West Caribbean Airways Flight 708, a McDonnell Douglas MD-82 operating on a charter flight, stalls at an altitude of 33,000 feet (10,000 meters) and crashes near Machiques in the mountains of northwestern Venezuela, killing all 160 people on board. It is the deadliest air disaster in the history of Venezuela, the deadliest involving a McDonnell Douglas MD-82, and the third-deadliest involving an aircraft of the McDonnell Douglas MD-80 series. It will turn out to be the deadliest aviation accident of 2005.
- 23 August – Attempting a landing in high winds and torrential rain at Pucallpa Airport in Pucallpa, Peru, TANS Peru Flight 204, a Boeing 737-244 Advanced, strikes tree tops and crashes in a swamp, killing 40 of the 98 people on board. Looters steal parts of the wreckage to sell for scrap.

=== September ===
- Northwest Airlines Cargo joins the Skyteam Cargo airline alliance.
- Intercontinental de Aviación ceases operations.
- 1 September – Norway's Accident Investigation Board for Civil Aviation and Railways –takes on the responsibility for the investigation of road accidents in Norway and is renamed the Accident Investigation Board Norway.
- 5 September – Mandala Airlines Flight 091, Boeing 737-2Q3Adv with 117 people on board, crashes into a heavily populated residential area seconds after taking off from Polonia International Airport in Medan, Indonesia, destroying dozens of houses and cars. The crash is the third deadliest in Indonesian history, killing 100 people aboard the airliner and 49 people on the ground. It injures the 17 survivors aboard the plane and 26 people on the ground. The governor of North Sumatra, Rizal Nurdin, and the former governor, Raja Inal Siregar, are among the dead.
- 21 September – JetBlue Airways Flight 292, an Airbus A320 makes an emergency landing at Los Angeles International Airport after its nose wheels gets stuck at a 90-degree angle. All 145 people on board survive.

=== October ===
- 1 October –Baltimore–Washington International Airport in Baltimore, Maryland, is renamed Baltimore-Washington International Thurgood Marshall Airport.
- 14 October – Air Jamaica Express ceases operations.
- 16 October – United States Secretary of Homeland Security Michael Chertoff officially approves the transfer of the U.S. Federal Air Marshal Service from U.S. Immigration & Customs Enforcement to the U.S. Transportation Security Administration.
- 22 October – Bellview Airlines Flight 210, a Boeing 737-200, crashes just after takeoff from Murtala Mohammed Airport in Lagos, Nigeria, killing all 117 people on board.
- 25 October – Visa Parviainen jumps from a hot air balloon over Lahti, Finland, in a wingsuit with two small turbojet engines attached to his feet, providing approximately 160 newtons (16 kgf, 35 lbf) of thrust each and running on JET A-1 kerosene fuel. Parviainen achieves approximately 30 seconds of horizontal flight with no noticeable loss of altitude.
- 29 October
  - Ghana International Airlines begins service with an inaugural flight from Accra, Ghana, to London.
  - Aer Lingus withdraws its last two Boeing 737 airliners from service. Henceforth, Aer Lingus operates an all-Airbus fleet.

=== November ===
- 6 November – Iraqi Airways makes a flight to Iran for the first time since the outbreak of the Iran–Iraq War in September 1980, with service between Baghdad and Tehran using an aircraft operated on its behalf by Teebah Airlines of Jordan.
- 14 November – Boeing launches the Boeing 747-8.
- 26 November – Launching from Mumbai, India, 67-year-old Indian aviator Vijaypat Singhania sets a new world altitude record for hot-air balloons, reaching 21,027 meters (68,986 feet) during a flight of about five hours in a Cameron Z-1600 balloon.
- 28 November – Boeing makes its last delivery of a Boeing 757 airliner, and Shanghai Airlines becomes the last customer to take delivery of one. Boeing had ceased production of the 757 in October 2004 after manufacturing 1,050 of the aircraft for 54 customers.

=== December ===
- 1 December - The Indonesian airline Awair changes its name to Indonesia AirAsia.
- 6 December – An Islamic Republic of Iran Air Force C-130E Hercules crashes into a ten-story apartment building in Tehran, Iran, killing all 94 people on the plane and between 22 and 34 people on the ground. The crash injures 90 other people on the ground.
- 7 December – Indian Airlines rebrands itself as Indian.
- 8 December – While landing in a snowstorm at Chicago Midway International Airport in Chicago, Illinois, United States, Southwest Airlines Flight 1248, a Boeing 737-7H4 with 103 people on board, goes into a skid on the runway. Its nose gear collapses, and it crashes through a barrier and comes to rest on a road crowded with automobile traffic, striking three cars. The accident kills a six-year-old boy in one of the cars and injures nine other people on the ground and three people aboard the aircraft.
- 10 December – Sosoliso Airlines Flight 1145, a McDonnell Douglas DC-9-32, crash-lands at Port Harcourt International Airport in Port Harcourt, Nigeria, and bursts into flames, killing 108 of the 110 people on board and injuring both survivors.
- 19 December – Chalk's Ocean Airways Flight 101, a Grumman G-73T Turbine Mallard flying boat, loses a wing due to metal fatigue and crashes into the Atlantic Ocean near Miami, Florida, killing all 20 people on board. It is the first fatal crash for Chalk's Ocean Airways, which had operated since 1917, but its fleet of Mallards is deemed not airworthy and grounded, and the airline goes out of business.
- 23 December – Azerbaijan Airlines Flight 217, an Antonov An-140-100, suffers an in-flight systems failure and crashes on the shore of the Caspian Sea near Nardaran, Azerbaijan, killing all 23 people on board.
- 31 December – According to the U.S. Federal Aviation Administration, there were 283 incidents of lasers striking aircraft flying over the United States during 2005.

== First flights ==
=== February ===
- AeroJames 01 Isatis

=== April ===
- 23 April – Cessna Citation Mustang
- 27 April – The first Airbus A380, registration F-WWOW, makes its maiden flight from Toulouse, France.

=== May ===
- 5 May – Dassault Falcon 7X

=== June ===
- 3 June — Issoire APM 30 Lion
- 15 June — CZAW Parrot
- 21 June – First captive flight of Boeing X-37 under the Scaled Composites White Knight

=== July ===
- 20 July – Grob SPn

=== September ===
- 30 September – ATG Javelin

=== November ===
- 27 November – Hongdu L-15

=== December ===
- 11 December – Pawnee Chief
- 22 December — CZAW SportCruiser

== Entered service ==
- December- F-22 Raptor with the 27th Fighter Squadron

== Deadliest crash ==
The deadliest crash of this year was West Caribbean Airways Flight 708, a McDonnell Douglas MD-80 which crashed near Machiques, Venezuela on 16 August, killing all 160 people on board. This particular accident took place in August 2005, which is one of the deadliest months in aviation to date, in which 351 people were killed in six major accidents.

== Retirements ==
- 27 July – Lockheed F-104 Starfighter was retired by the Italian Air Force, the final military user of the F104.
