= Air racing =

Air sport

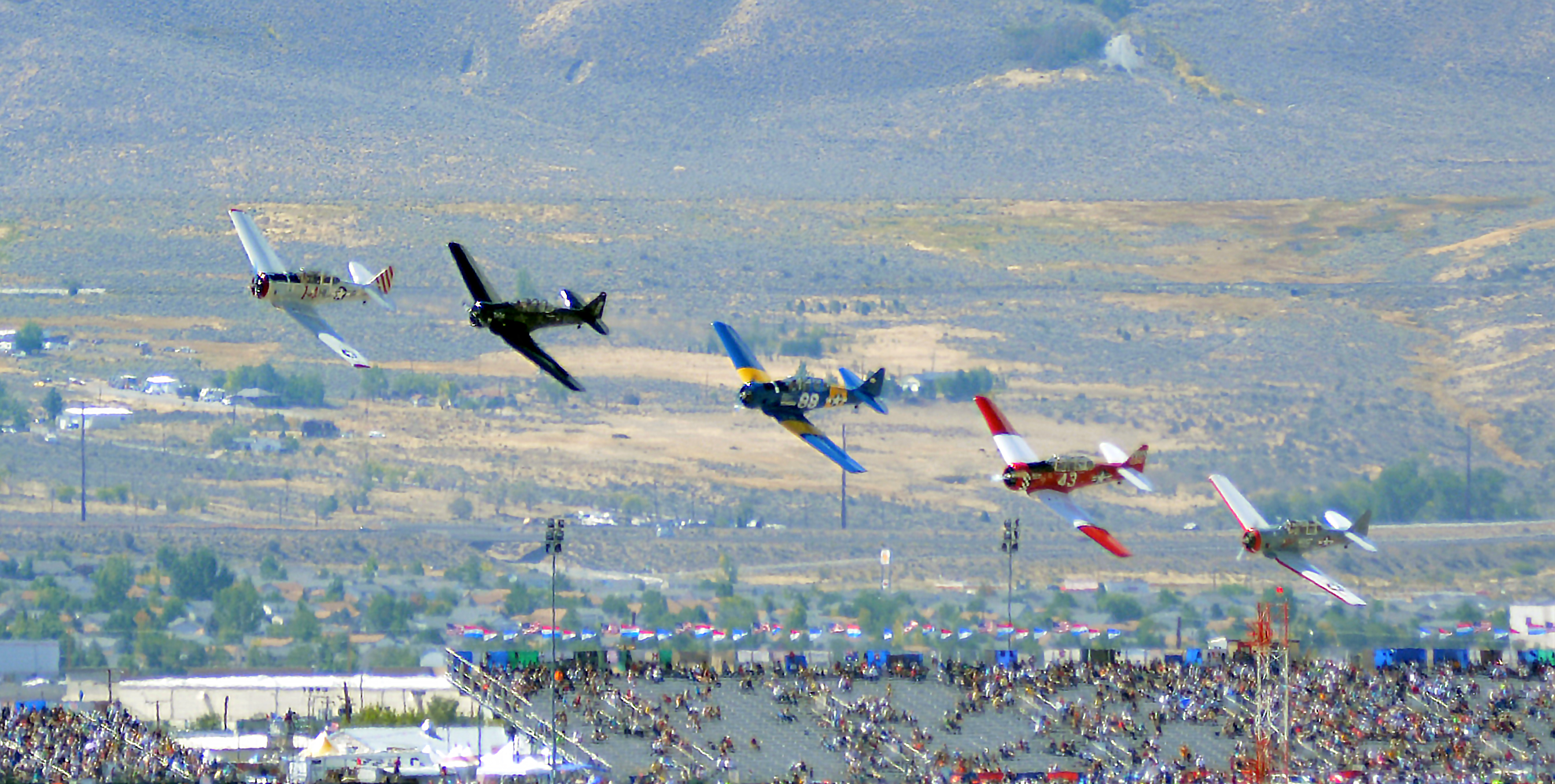
T-6 Gold Start passing the finish pylon at the 2014 Reno Air Races

Air racing is a type of motorsport that involves airplanes or other types of aircraft that compete over a fixed course, with the winner either returning the shortest time, the one to complete it with the most points, or to come closest to a previously estimated time.

== History ==
The first 'heavier-than-air' air race was held on 23 May 1909 - the Prix de Lagatinerie, at the Port-Aviation aerodrome (often called "Juvisy Airfield") in Viry-Châtillon south of Paris, France. Four pilots entered the race, two started, but nobody completed the full race distance; though this was not unexpected, as the rules specified that whoever travelled furthest would be the winner if no-one completed the race. Léon Delagrange, who covered slightly more than half of the ten 1.2-kilometre (0.75 mi; 0.65 nmi) laps was declared the winner.

Some other minor events were held before the Grande Semaine d'Aviation de la Champagne in 22–29 August 1909 at Reims, France. This was the first major international flying event, drawing the most important aircraft makers and pilots of the era, as well as celebrities and royalty. The premier event — the first Gordon Bennett Trophy competition — was won by Glenn Curtiss, who beat second-place finisher Louis Blériot by five seconds. Curtiss was named 'Champion Air Racer of the World'.

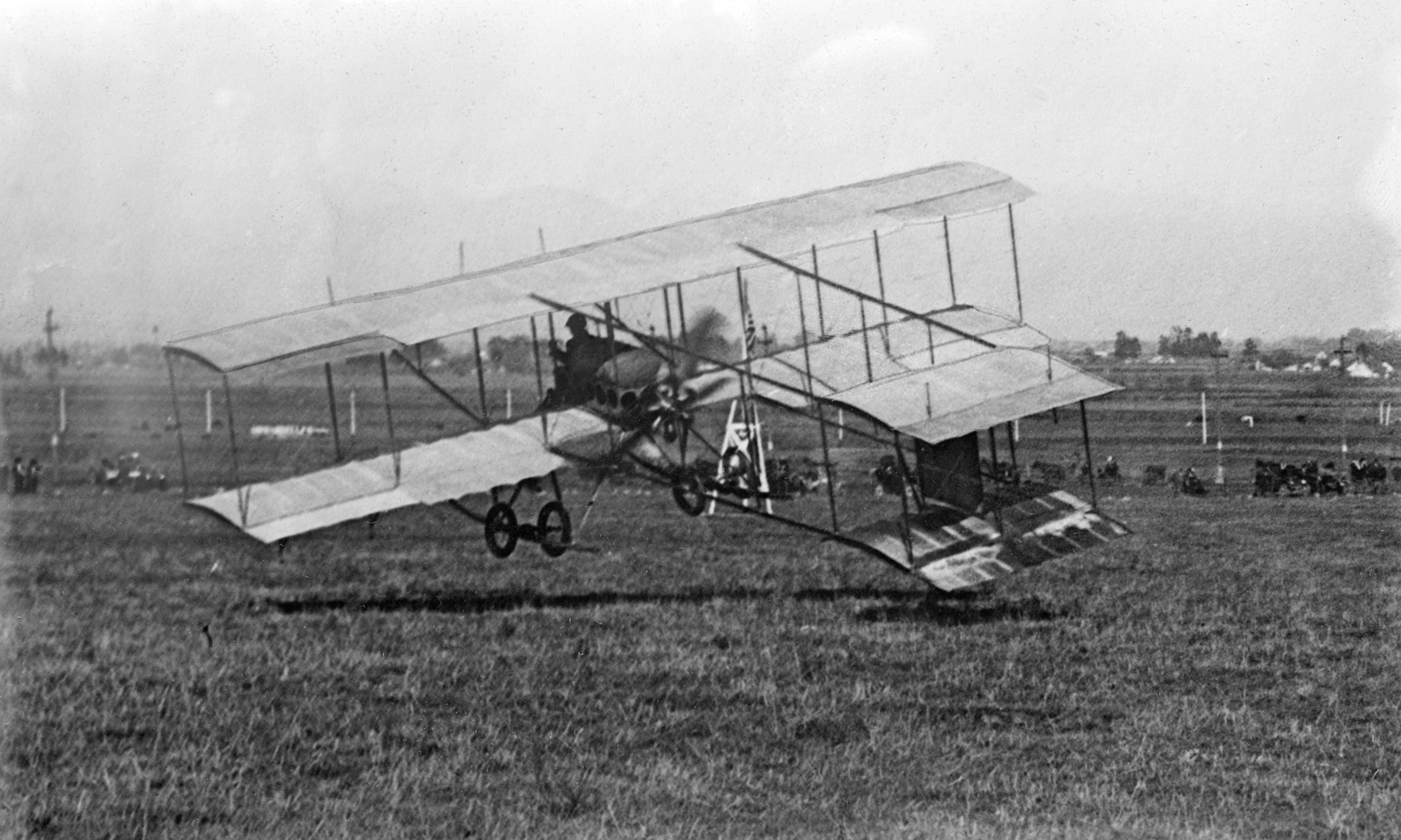
Louis Paulhan in a Farman III at the 1910 Los Angeles International Air Meet at Dominguez Field

The first air race in the United States was the 1910 Los Angeles International Air Meet at Dominguez Field, just south of Los Angeles, from 10 to 20 January 1910. The event was organised by pilots A. Roy Knabenshue and Charles Willard, who raised funding from railroad magnate Henry Huntington, and the Los Angeles Merchants and Manufacturers Association. William Randolph Hearst carried coverage of the event in his Los Angeles Examiner, and hired a hot air balloon with a promotional parse touting his newspaper. The event attracted 43 entrants, of which 16 appeared. It was there that aviation pioneer and military pilot Jimmy Doolittle, then thirteen, saw his first airplane.

In the years before the First World War, popular interest in aviation led to a large number of air races in Europe; including the 1911 Circuit of Europe race, the Daily Mail Circuit of Britain Air Race, and the Aerial Derby.

In 1913, the first Schneider Trophy seaplane race was held. When the competition was resumed after the war, it was significant in advancing aeroplane design, particularly in the fields of aerodynamics and engine design, and would show its results in the best fighters of World War II.

On 19 October 1919, the Army Transcontinental Air Race began along a 2,700 mi (2,346 nmi; 4,345 km) route from Long Island, New York to San Francisco, California, and back, which would see widespread carnage; including seven fatalities (two en route to the race). Of the 48 aircraft that started, 33 would complete the double crossing of the continent.

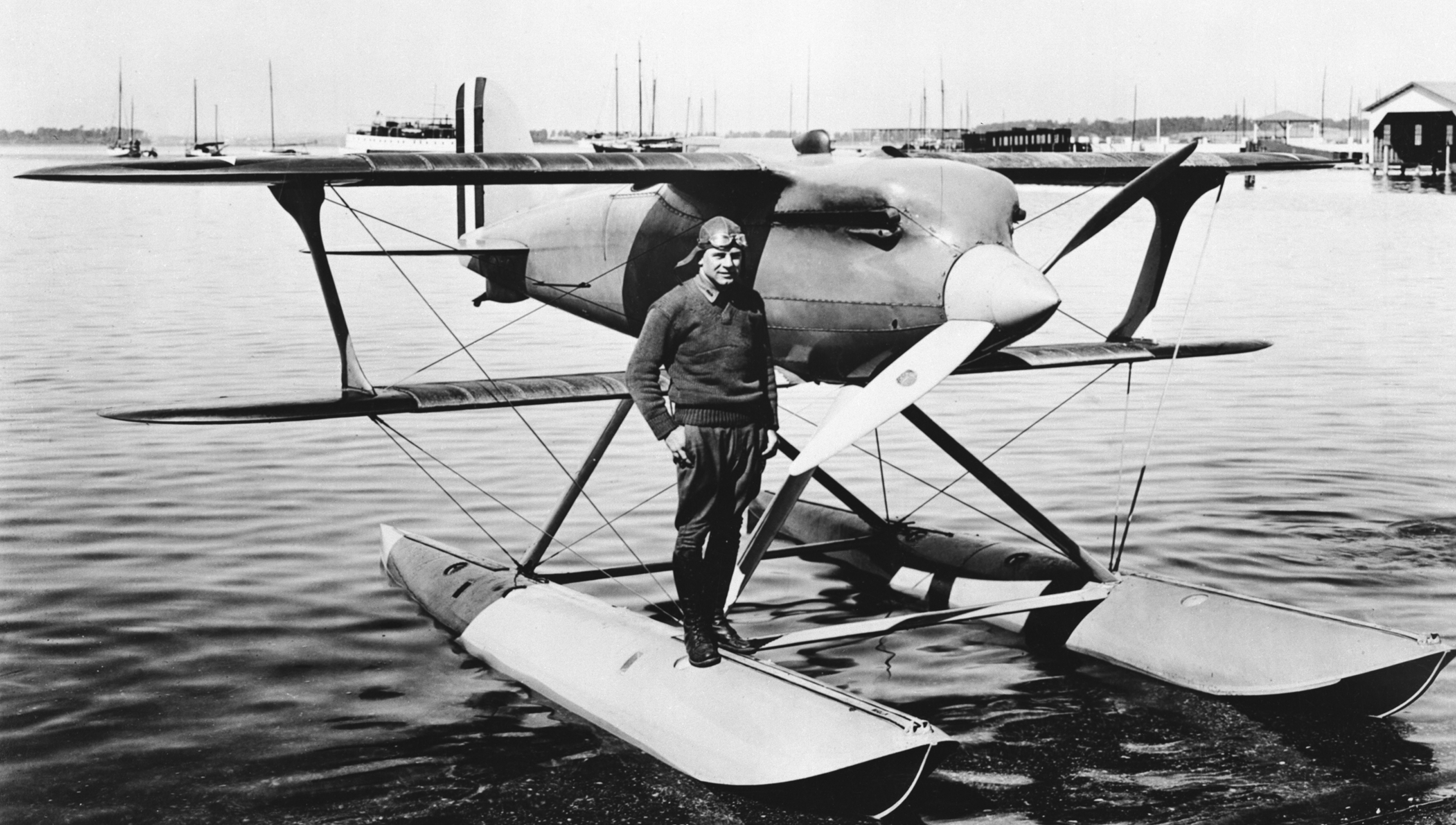
Jimmy Doolittle on his Curtiss R3C-2 Racer, the plane in which he won the 1925 Schneider Trophy Race

In 1921, the United States instituted the National Air Meets, which became the National Air Races in 1924. In 1929, the Women's Air Derby, nicknamed the 'Powder Puff Derby', became a part of the National Air Races circuit. The National Air Races lasted until 1949. The Cleveland Air Races was another important event. In 1947, an All-Woman Transcontinental Air Race, also dubbed the Powder Puff Derby was established, running until 1977.

In 1934, the MacRobertson Air Race from England to Australia took place, with the winning de Havilland Comet flown by C. W. A. Scott and Tom Campbell Black. From 1934 until 1938, the Flight Around Latvia competition took place.

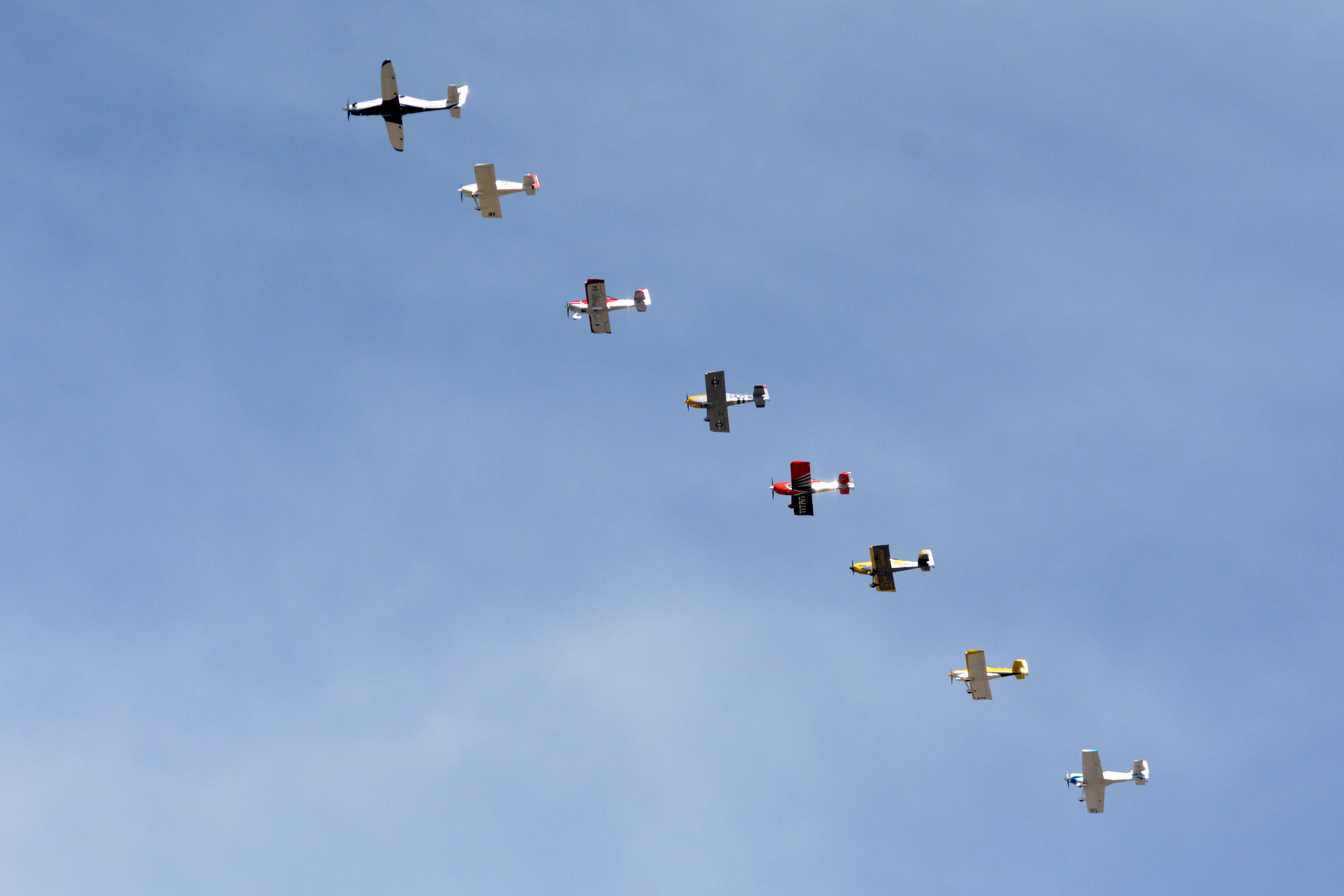
Start formation Sport Class 2014 Reno Air Races

In 1964, Bill Stead, a Nevada rancher, pilot, and unlimited hydroplane racing champion, organised the first Reno Air Races at a small dirt strip called the Sky Ranch, located between Sparks, Nevada, and Pyramid Lake. The National Championship Air Races were soon moved to the Reno Stead Airport, and have been held there every September since 1966. The five-day event attracts around 200,000 people, and includes racing around courses marked out by pylons for six classes of aircraft: Unlimited, Formula One, Sport Biplane, AT-6, Sport, and Jet. It also features civil airshow acts, military flight demonstrations, and a large static aircraft display. Other promoters have run pylon racing events across the US and Canada, including races in Las Vegas, NV in 1965, Lancaster, CA in 1965 and 1966, Mojave, California in 1970-71, and 1973–79; at Cape May, NJ in 1971, San Diego, CA in 1971, Miami, FL in 1973 and 1979, Moose Jaw, Saskatchewan in 1984; Hamilton Field, California, in 1988; at Dallas, TX in 1990, in Denver, CO in 1990 and 1992, in Kansas City in 1993, in Phoenix, Arizona in 1994 and 1995; and in Tunica, Mississippi in 2005. Numerous other venues across the United States, Canada, and Mexico have also hosted events featuring the smaller Formula One and Biplane classes.

In 1970, American Formula One racing was exported to Europe (Great Britain, and then to France), where almost as many races have been held as in the U.S.A. Also in 1970, the California 1000 Air Race started at the Mojave Airport with a 66 lap unlimited air race that featured a Douglas DC-7, with one aircraft completing the circuit.

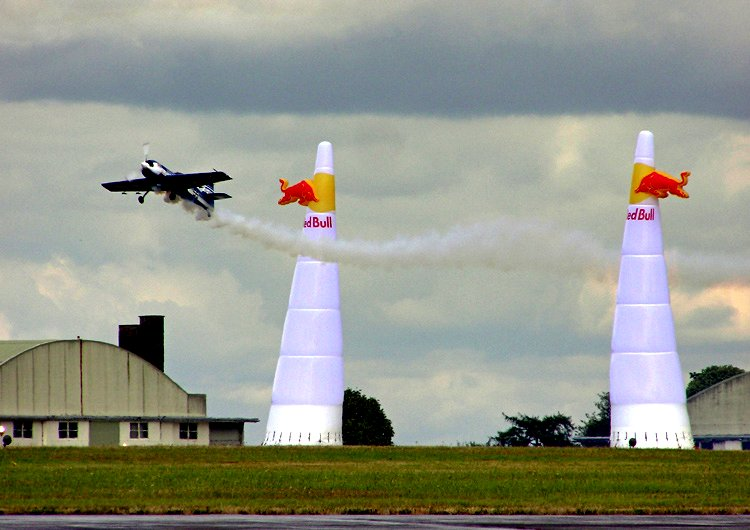
Air racing in England: the Red Bull Air Race heat held at Kemble airfield, Gloucestershire. The aircraft fly singly, and have to pass between pairs of pylons.

In 2003, Red Bull created a series called the Red Bull Air Race World Championship, in which competitors flew individually between pairs of pylons, while performing prescribed manoeuvres. Usually held over water near large cities, the sport has attracted large crowds and renewed media interest in air racing. The inaugural season had stops in Austria and Hungary. In 2019, Red Bull decided not to continue the Red Bull Air Race World Championship.

Aero GP has multiple aircraft racing together pik around pylons, and is based in Europe where it has held an air race each year since 2005.

In June 2005 against all odds and extreme pressure from the Reno Air Race Association not to start another race, entrepreneur Jeff Landers, a Memphis native, organized the Tunica Air Races in Tunica, Mississippi with Unlimited, T-6, and Sport classes represented. After the successful and safe race in 2005 RARA fought any and all efforts for the growth of this motorsport and any effort for a 2006 race there and one in Tucson Arizona.

Powered paragliding or paramotor races have been organised by the Parabatix Sky Racers made up of the world's top paramotor pilots. The first occurring on 4 September 2010 in an airfield in Montauban, Southern France. These are foot-launched ram-air wings powered by small two-stroke engines, and allow for much smaller race venues such as city parks or beaches, where the audience can see the pilots up close as they carry out spectacular manoeuvres swooping close to the ground-pylons during the race.

In November 2021, the first remotely-piloted eVTOL drag race between two Airspeeder craft took place. In 2022, The remotely-piloted racing series (Airspeeder EXA Series) began in 2022 with Zephatali Walsh named as the inaugural season champion. The aircraft, built by Alauda Aeronautics, use electric vertical take-off and landing (eVTOL) technology and are designed to be crewed by human pilots.

=== Historical Air Racing Series and Events ===
Event	1st Race	Final Race	Description	course	field	sanctioning body
Gordon Bennett Trophy	1909	1920	time trials	Pilon, rally (1920)	open	
Daily Mail aviation prizes	1910	1930	various events to encourage aviation	point to point & circuit	open	Daily Mail
Coupe Deutsch de la Meurthe	1912	1936	encourage aviation	cross-country circuit	open	Aéro-Club de France
Schneider Trophy	1913	1931	encourage seaplane development	triangle	seaplanes	Fédération Aéronautique Internationale (FAI)
Dole Derby	1927	1927	California to Hawaii	point to point	open	National Aeronautic Association (NAA)
Challenge International de Tourisme	1929	1934	encourage light aircraft development	technical trials & rally	light aircraft	Fédération Aéronautique Internationale (FAI)
Thompson Trophy	1929	1961	unlimited	pylon	open	National Aeronautics Association (NAA)
Women's Air Derby	1929	1929	unlimited	transcontinental (US)	female pilots	
Bendix Trophy	1931		unlimited	transcontinental (US)	open	
MacRobertson Air Race	1934	1934	commemorate 1934 Melbourne Centennial	intercontinental (UK to Australia)	open	Royal Aero Club (RAC)
Formula V Air Racing	1977		provide affordable racing	circuit	formula aircraft	Formula V Air Racing Association
Skyrace Tasmania	1994		Racing around a 7km and 14km circuit at the WW2 Aerodrome, Valleyfield, Tasmania as well as a Navigation race around Tasmania, Australia	Australian National Air Races		
Aero GP	2005		pylon races plus additional disciplines			
Air Race 1 World Cup	2014		International series of pylon races composed of International Formula One class aircraft			
National Championship Air Races, Reno	1964	2023	Ultimately included 7 classes: Unlimiteds/Warbirds, Jets, T-6, Sport, Biplane, Formula One, and STOL Drag.	Reno Air Racing Association		
Red Bull Air Race World Championship	2003	2019	Pylon races through inflatable gates with a knockout system	FAI		

== Current Air Racing Series and Events ==
Event	1st race	Description	Sanctioning Body
British Air Racing Championship	1952	handicapped air races	Royal Aero Club Records Racing and Rally Association
Hayward Air Rally	1965	Proficiency navigation and fuel planning competition, starting in Hayward, CA (KHWD), courses vary every year.	
Air Race Classic	1977	All women's cross country race, with handicapped speed planes; courses change every year with at min. 2100 NM routes, completed within 4 days; previously known as the All Women's Transcontinental Air Race (AWTAR) which in turn was popularly known as the Powder Puff Derby - founded after the first Women's Air Derby of 1929	
Schneider Trophy	1981	landplanes, revived commemoration of original races	Royal Aero Club Records Racing and Rally Association
Air Venture Cup		Cross country race held in the vicinity and just prior to EAA Airventure in Oshkosh, WI	
European Air Racing Championship	2000	handicapped air races	Royal Aero Club Records Racing and Rally Association
Parabatix Sky Racers	2010	Paramotor precision air races, pylon racing, interactive ground obstacles, one & two aircraft at a time	
Airspeeder	2022	eVTOL races with experimental electric aircraft, digital circuit tracks with one & two aircraft at a time.	
Air Race X	2023	Pylon races with a knockout system	
Las Cruces Air and Space Expo/SkyFiesta	2023	Sport Class	Sport Air Racing Council
National Championship Air Races, Roswell Air Races	2025	Successor to the Reno Air Races hosting 7 classes: Unlimiteds/Warbirds, Jets, T-6, Sport, Biplane, Formula One, and STOL Drag.	Reno Air Racing Association

== Classes (Closed Course Pylon Racing) ==
Restricting aircraft to a specific type or design creates a competition that focuses on pilot skill. Air racing events such as the Reno air races, incorporate multiple classes or aircraft. These may be defined by the race organiser, or by a sanctioned group. Some events are limited to a single class. A list of past and present classes is provided below:

Class	first race	primary description	sanctioning body
T-6	1946	Stock T-6/Harvard/SNJ with a P&W R-1340-AN-1 engine	
Biplane	1964	360 cubic inches (5,899 cubic centimetres) engines, mostly Pitts Specials	Professional Race Pilots Association biplane division
International Formula One	1970	200 cubic inches (3,277 cubic centimetres) engines	International Formula One Air Racing
Formula V	1972	98 cubic inches (1,606 cubic centimetres) Volkswagen engines	(defunct)
Sport Class	1998	Experimental propeller driven aircraft with a max weight of 1,750 kilograms per FAI C-1c.	Sport Class Air Racing
Unlimited/Warbird	1964	Heavy piston engine aircraft. Generally standard or modified WWII fighters, (P-51 Mustang, F8F Bearcat, Hawker Sea Fury, etc.) with a few notable purpose-built built aircraft (Tsunami, Pond Racer)	National Air-Racing Group (NAG)
Jet Class	2002	L-39, L-29 Provost, Iskra, and de Havilland Vampires	Racing Jets, Inc.

== Notable racing pilots ==
- Antoine de Saint-Exupéry
- Pancho Barnes
- Lowell Bayles
- André Beaumont
- Péter Besenyei
- Louis Bleriot
- Paul Bonhomme
- Alan Cobham
- Jacqueline Cochran
- Glenn Curtiss
- Geoffrey de Havilland
- Geoffrey de Havilland Jr.
- Jimmy Doolittle
- Amelia Earhart
- Roland Garros
- Eugene Gilbert
- Claude Grahame-White
- Gustav Hamel
- Harry Hawker
- Frank Hawks
- Alex Henshaw
- Steve Hinton
- Skip Holm
- Benny Howard
- Amy Johnson
- Hubert Latham
- Tony LeVier
- Johnny Livingston
- Mike Mangold
- Paul Mantz
- Jim Mollison
- John Moisant
- Blanche Noyes
- Adolphe Pégoud
- John Cyril Porte
- C. W. A. Scott
- Lyle Shelton
- Thomas Sopwith
- Louise Thaden
- Bobbi Trout
- Roscoe Turner
- Jules Védrines
- Jimmy Wedell
- Steve Wittman
- Charles Terres Weymann

== Racing airplanes ==
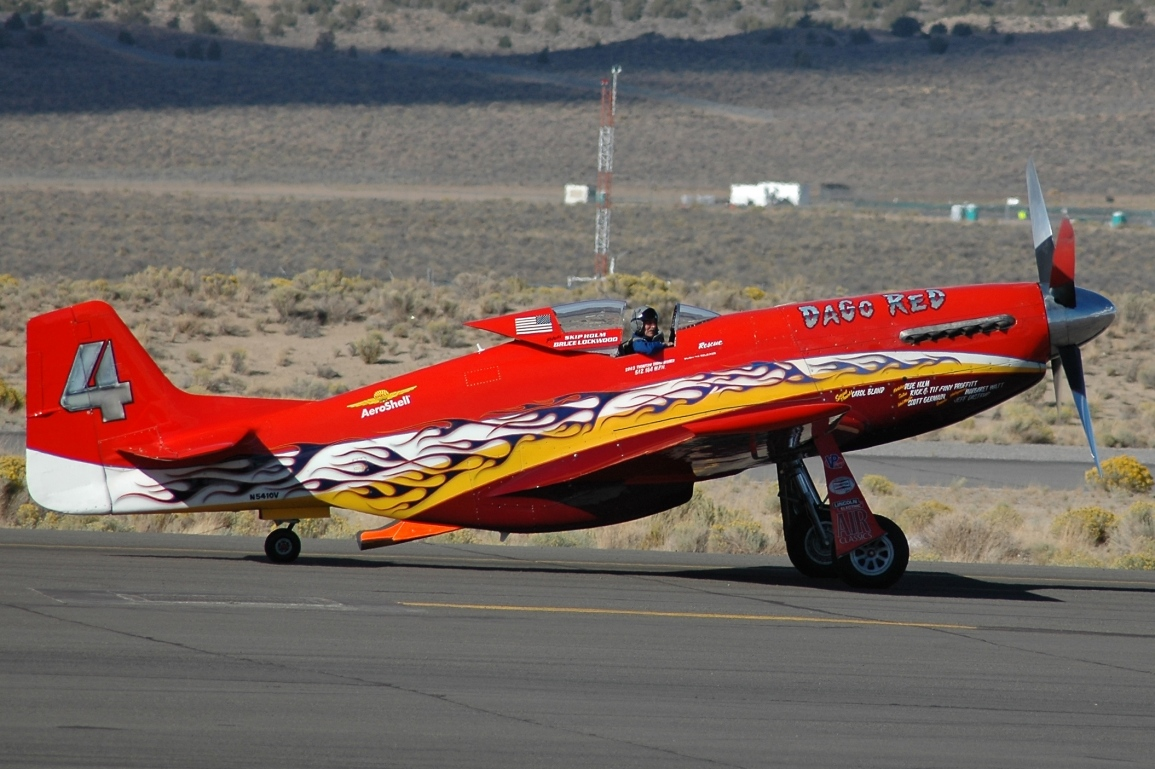
P-51D Mustang Dago Red

== See also ==
- Model aircraft#Competitions
- Drone racing
