= Flight 268 =

Flight 268 may refer to:

- Pakistan International Airlines Flight 268, crashed on 28 September 1992
- British Airways Flight 268, had an engine failure on February 20, 2005
