= 2022 in aviation =

This is a list of aviation-related events in 2022. Throughout the year, the aviation industry was recovering from the COVID-19 pandemic.

== Events ==
=== January ===
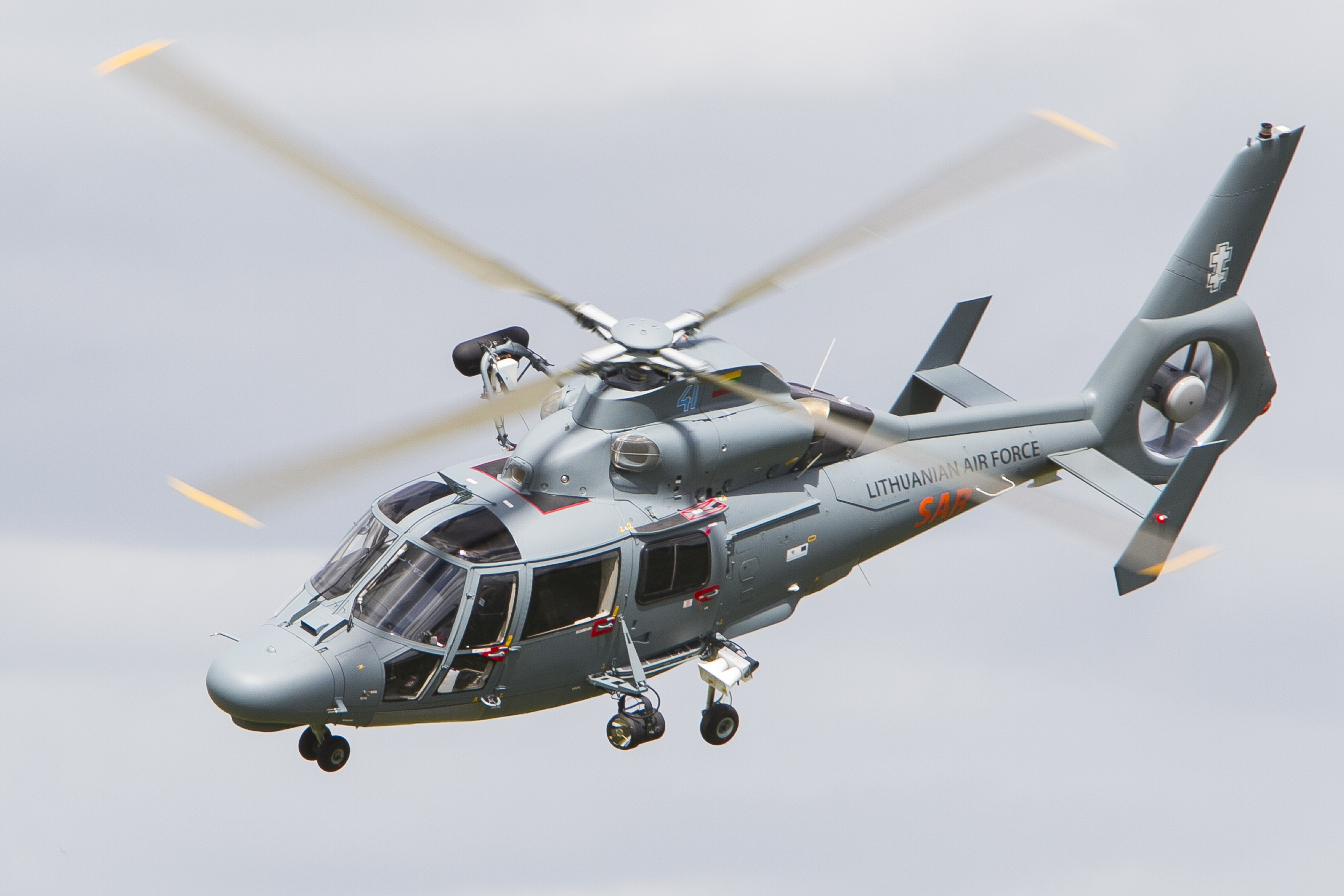
Airbus Helicopters delivered the last Eurocopter Dauphin helicopter on 21 January; more than 1,100 have been produced since 1972.

1 January
The Airbus group creates Airbus Atlantic, the world number two in aerostructures, combining the resources of Stelia Aerospace and two Airbus sites.
The Prime Minister of Denmark announces a goal to eliminate the use of fossil fuels for the country's domestic flights by 2030.

5 January
Protesters seize Almaty International Airport during the 2022 Kazakh unrest, halting flights, and Kazakh President Kassym-Jomart Tokayev appeals to Russian security forces to retake the facility.

6 January
The Royal Norwegian Air Force withdraws its F-16 fighter fleet from operational service. It becomes the first air force to have only F-35As as combat planes.

7 January
TASS reports that Collective Security Treaty Organization troops have occupied Almaty International Airport and restored order.

8 January
An Aviastar-TU cargo Tu-204 is destroyed by a fire at Hangzhou Airport in China, after arriving from Novosibirsk Airport in Novosibirsk, Russia. The two occupants, the pilot and co-pilot, are unharmed.

14 January
Boom Supersonic begins conducting engine runs using their Boom XB-1 supersonic demonstrator aircraft.

20 January
Belgian-British pilot Zara Rutherford becomes, at age 19, the youngest woman to fly solo around the world after a five-month journey which began in Kortrijk, Belgium on 18 August 2021.

21 January
Enstrom Helicopter Corporation ceases activities after almost 62 years of operations.
Airbus Helicopters delivers the last Eurocopter Dauphin helicopter, more than 1,100 of which have been produced since 1972.

27 January
A C295 equipped with Airbus's semi-morphing wings completes its first flight in Seville, Spain. With other new materials and technologies, Airbus aims to reduce CO_{2} emissions by up to 43% and NOx by up to 70% in a regional multi-mission configuration.

31 January
Boeing launches the 777-8 Freighter, with an order from Qatar Airways for 34 aircraft, with deliveries expected to start in 2027.

=== February ===
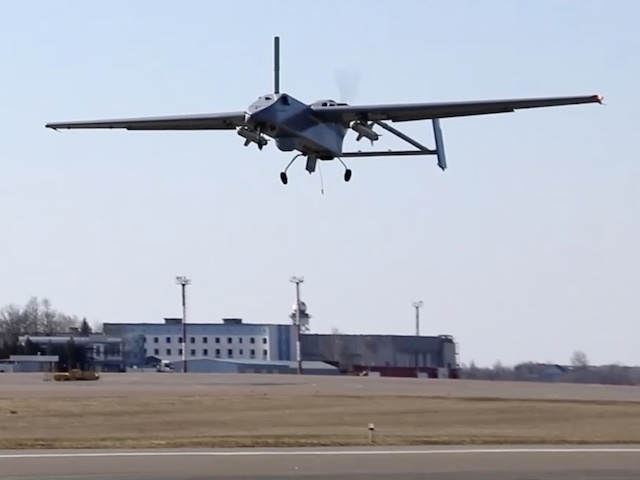
A UAV taking off from Gomel Airport (Belarus) during the 2022 Russian invasion of Ukraine

7 February
Frontier Airlines announces a planned merger with Spirit Airlines, in a $2.9 billion deal expected to close in the second half of 2022.
16 February
At the 2022 Singapore Airshow, Airbus gets two orders for the upcoming A350 freighter: a firm order from Singapore Airlines, for 7 aircraft to be delivered from 2025 onwards, and Etihad Airways, who signed a letter of intent for 7 aircraft.
22 February
Airbus announces a demonstration of a liquid hydrogen-fueled turbofan, with CFM International modifying a GE Passport, for a first flight expected within five years, mounted on an Airbus A380 prototype.
24 February
The airspace of Ukraine is closed, just a few hours before Russia begins the invasion of Ukraine, and flights flying to Ukraine are diverted to other airports.

25 February
EU sanctions against Russia include a ban on the sale of aircraft and spare parts. The sanctions also require lessors to terminate the leases on aircraft placed with Russian airlines.
27 February
All EU member states, as well as the UK and Canada, close their airspace to all Russian aircraft including both commercial and private aircraft. Russia issues a reciprocal ban, forcing many airlines to reroute or cancel flights to Asian destinations.
During the battle of Antonov Airport, the world's largest cargo plane, the Antonov An-225 Mriya, is destroyed by bombing and fire. Ukraine affirms its intent to rebuild the aircraft.

=== March ===
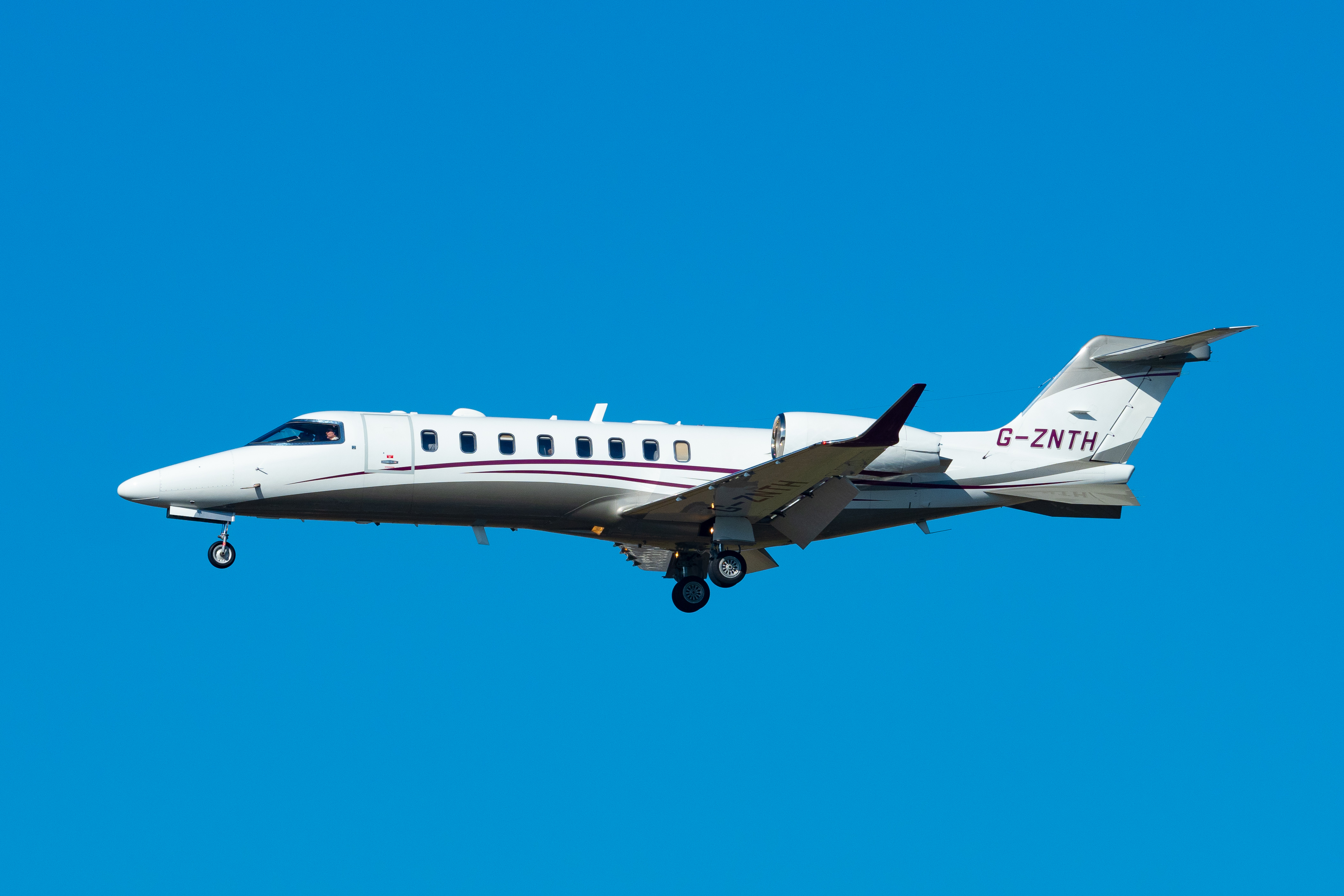
On 28 March, the final Learjet, a 75, is delivered after 60 years of production and more than 3,000 deliveries.

1 March
The United States closes its airspace to all Russian aircraft.
2 March
Airbus and Boeing both suspend maintenance support for Russian airlines.
7 March
Embraer announces its intentions to enter the cargo market by providing freighter conversions of E-190s and E-195s, entering service in 2024.
8 March
Aeroflot suspends all its remaining flights to international destinations (except for Minsk, Belarus) due to airspace restrictions and to counter the "risk" of aircraft being repossessed by lessors.
9 March
To avoid Russian airspace, Finnair adopts routes over the North Pole to Asia, the first time a polar route has been used in nearly 30 years.
14 March
The Cessna 408 SkyCourier receive its FAA type certification after 2,100 hours of flight tests.
Russian President Vladimir Putin signs a decree authorising Russian airlines to register in their own name aircraft leased from foreign companies, mainly Western ones. This nationalisation concerns approximately 500 airliners valued at over $10 billion.
17 March
US conglomerate Textron, parent of Beechcraft, Bell Textron and Cessna, announces the acquisition of Slovenian light aircraft manufacturer Pipistrel, producer of the Velis Electro, the first EASA certified electric aircraft, with a transaction due to close in the second quarter of 2022 to form the basis of a new eAviation division focused on "the development of sustainable aircraft".
21 March
China Eastern Airlines Flight 5735, a Boeing 737-800 crashes in the mountains of Guangxi near Guangzhou, killing all 132 people on board.
28 March
As Bombardier focuses on its larger Challenger and Global business jets, the final Learjet, a 75, is delivered after 60 years of production and more than 3,000 deliveries, while over 2,000 remain in service.

=== April ===
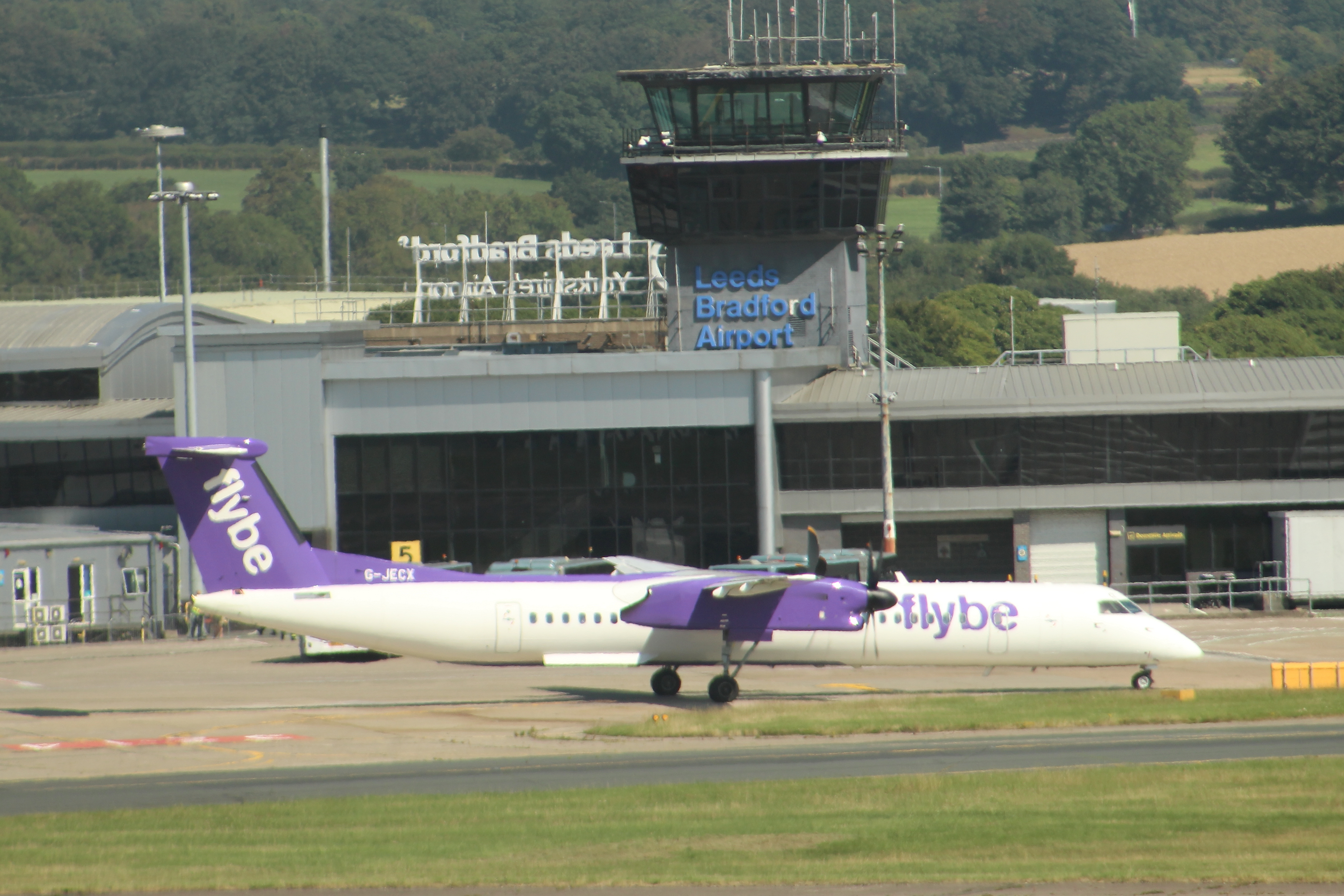
British regional airline Flybe (2022–2023) was relaunched on 13 April.

7 April
DHL Aero Expreso Flight 7216, a Boeing 757-200 freighter crash-lands after a runway excursion at Juan Santamaria International Airport, causing the aircraft to break in two. However, the crew members escape with minor injuries.
13 April
Newly relaunched British regional airline Flybe (2022–2023) makes its first flight from Birmingham to Belfast.
19 April
The U.S. government announces that the mask mandate will be no longer be enforced on domestic flights, but will still be enforced on select international flights.
28 April
Boeing Defense, Space & Security rolls out the first of 351 production T-7A Red Hawk training aircraft, a $9.2 billion contract for the USAF.
Due to budget cuts, NASA announces that the SOFIA airborne observatory project will end by October 2022, and the aircraft being used as SOFIA, one of the final Boeing 747SP aircraft in service, will be grounded.

=== May ===
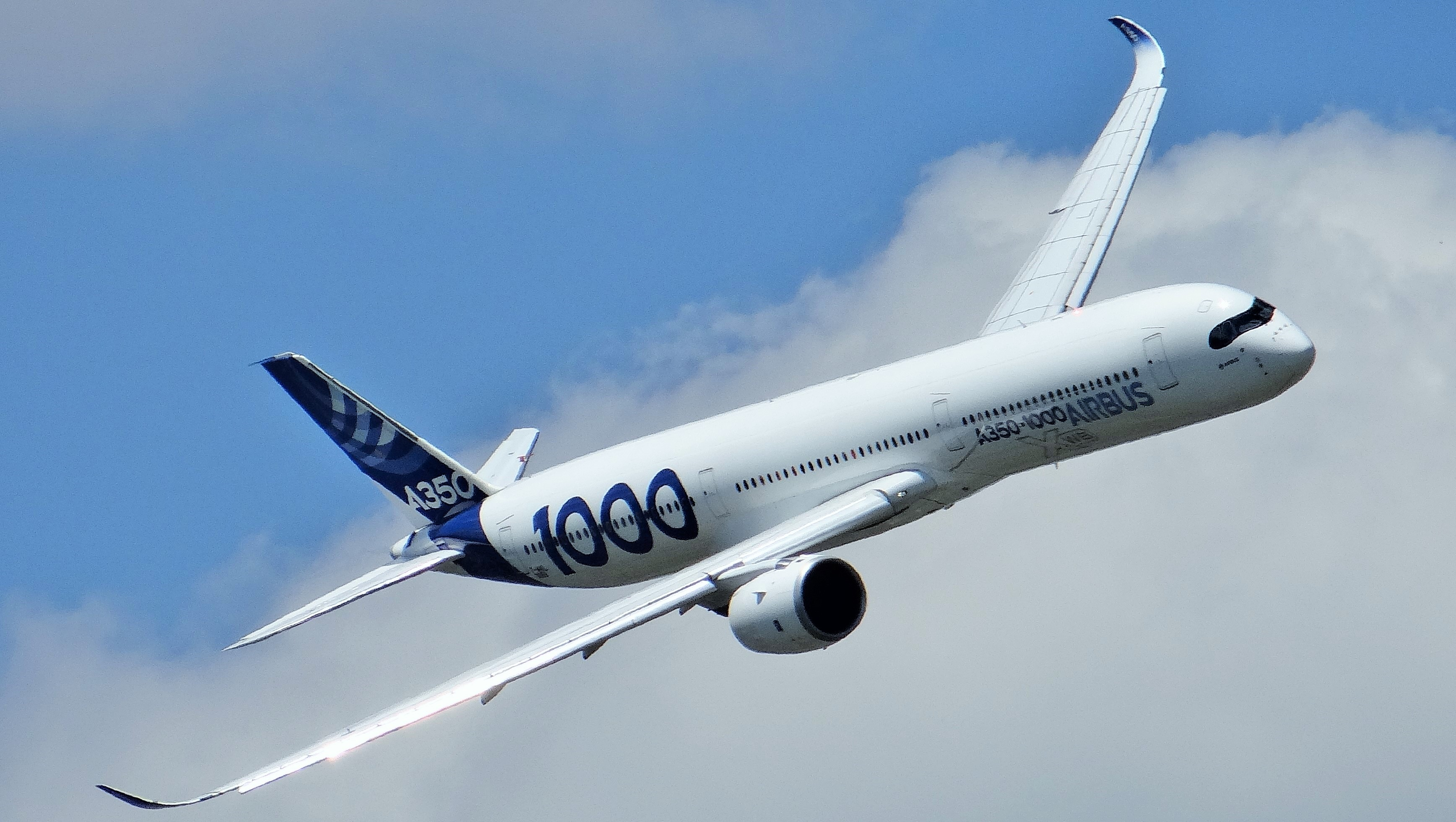
Qantas selected the A350-1000 for Project Sunrise non-stop flights on 2 May.

5 May
Boeing announces its headquarters will be moved from Chicago to Arlington, Virginia in the Washington, D.C. metropolitan area.

12 May
Tibet Airlines Flight 9833, an Airbus A319 crashes while taking off at Chongqing Jiangbei International Airport and catches fire. However, all people on board survive, but the aircraft is written off.

16 May
Antonov Airlines shifts its base from Hostomel Airport in Kyiv, Ukraine, to Leipzig-Halle Airport in Leipzig, Germany, after the destruction of the cargo airline's base at Gostomel.

20 May

Airspeeder conducts its first remotely-piloted eVTOL race, with Zephatali Walsh named as the inaugural season champion.

22 May
Two Rafale fighters of the French Air Force are involved in a mid-air collision during an airshow at Cognac, France. The two aircraft were able to land safely; part of a fin was recovered on the ground but no injuries were reported.

29 May
A Tara Air DHC-6 Twin Otter operating as Tara Air Flight 197 from Pokhara Airport to Jomsom Airport crashes in the Mustang District of Nepal; all 22 occupants are killed.

=== June ===
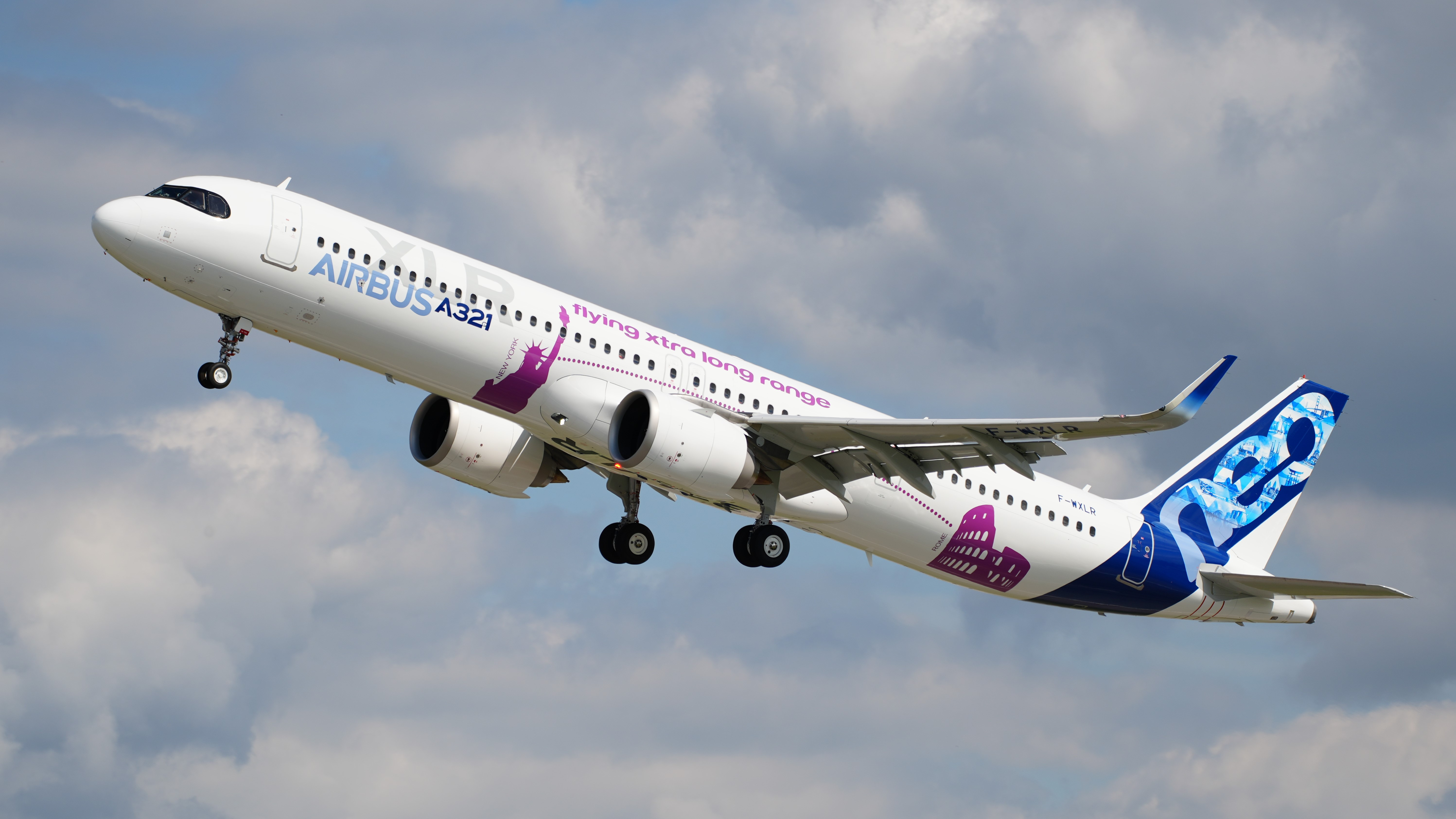
The A321XLR made its maiden flight on 15 June.

1 June
Kulula.com suspends all flights and enters business rescue before being placed into liquidation on 9 June.

7 June
In response to pressure from international sanctions, Aeroflot announces a $3 billion emergency share issue and plans to order 300 Russian-built aircraft, mostly the Irkut MC-21 and Sukhoi Superjet 100, as well as a smaller number of older Tupolev Tu-214s.

15 June
The Airbus A321XLR makes its maiden flight; entry into service is expected in 2024.

21 June
RED Air Flight 203, a McDonnell Douglas MD-82 crash-lands at Miami International Airport and catches fire. All people on board survive, but three occupants are hospitalized with minor injuries.

28 June
First flight of the Gulfstream G800.

=== July ===
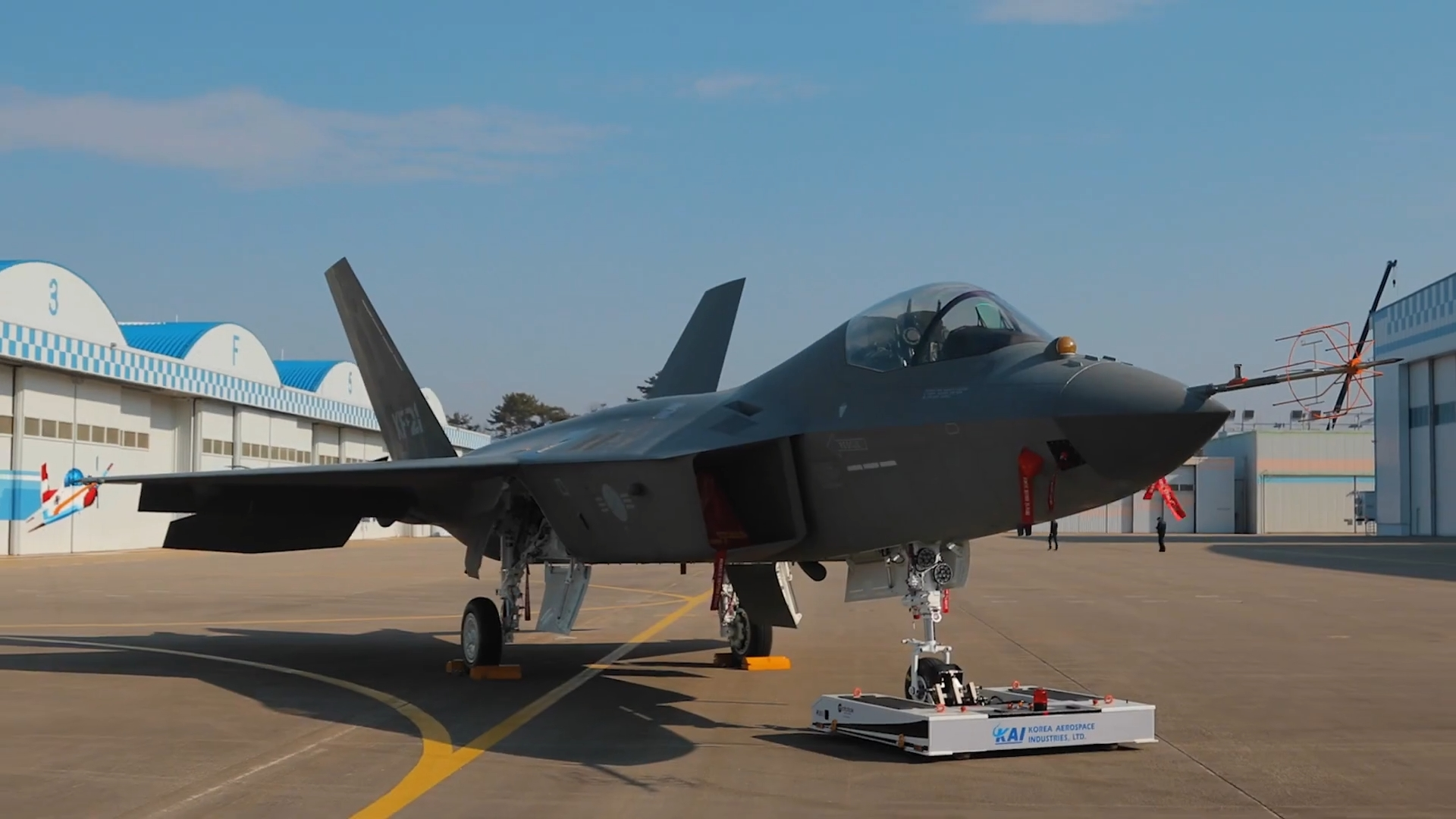
The Korean KAI KF-21 (ex-K-FX) prototype makes its first flight on 19 July.

5 July
Scandinavian Airlines files for Chapter 11 bankruptcy protection in the United States after pilots went on strike, and to accelerate the airline's transformation by implementing key elements of its SAS Forward plan.

16 July
An Antonov An-12BK, being operated as Meridian Air Cargo Flight 3032, crashes near Kavala, Greece while trying to make an emergency landing at Kavala International Airport.

18 July
A Fokker 50 on a Jubba Airways flight from Baidoa crashes on landing at Aden Adde International Airport, Mogadishu and flips over. All 33 occupants survive.

18–22 July
Farnborough Airshow resumes after the 2020 edition was cancelled due to the COVID-19 pandemic.

19 July
The KAI KF-21 Boramae Korean jet fighter makes its first flight from Korea Aerospace Industries facility at Sacheon, South Korea.

28 July
JetBlue announces a planned acquisition of Spirit Airlines for $3.8 billion.

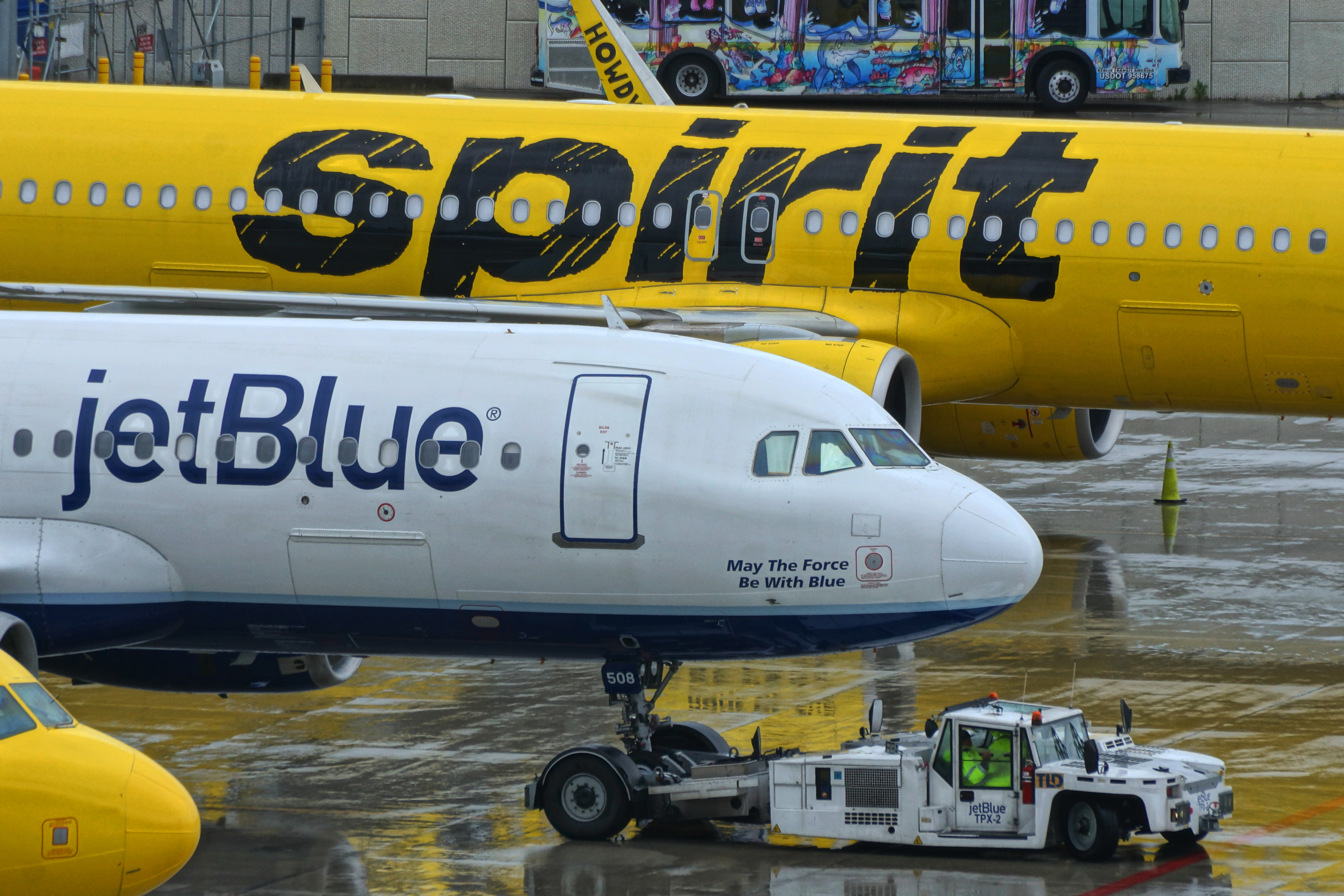
JetBlue announces its acquisition of Spirit Airlines on 28 July.

=== August ===
16 August
American Airlines makes an order for 20 Boom Overture supersonic airliners, making it the second major order for the Overture.

=== September ===
8 September
Airbus revokes all of Qatar Airways' remaining orders for the Airbus A350, raising the stakes in a safety and contractual dispute by the Gulf carrier.

27 September
Eviation Aircraft conducts the first flight of their Eviation Alice electric regional airliner, ahead of entry into service in 2023.
Virgin Atlantic announces that it will join the SkyTeam alliance in 2023.

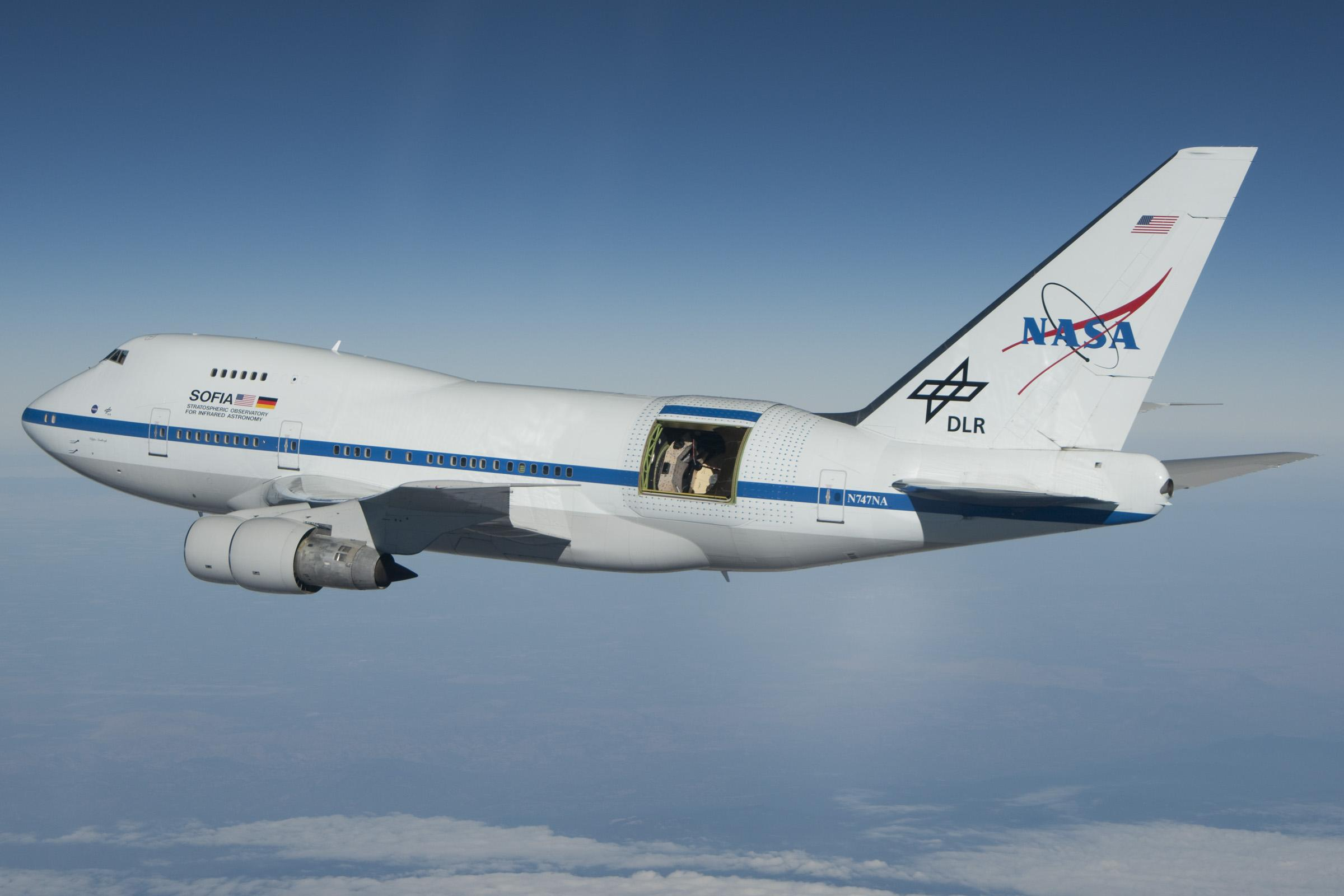
The last ever flight of the SOFIA airborne observatory occurs on 29 September.

29 September
NASA conducts the last ever flight of the SOFIA airborne observatory, and the aircraft operating as SOFIA, a Boeing 747SP, is retired, after 15 years of service.

=== October ===
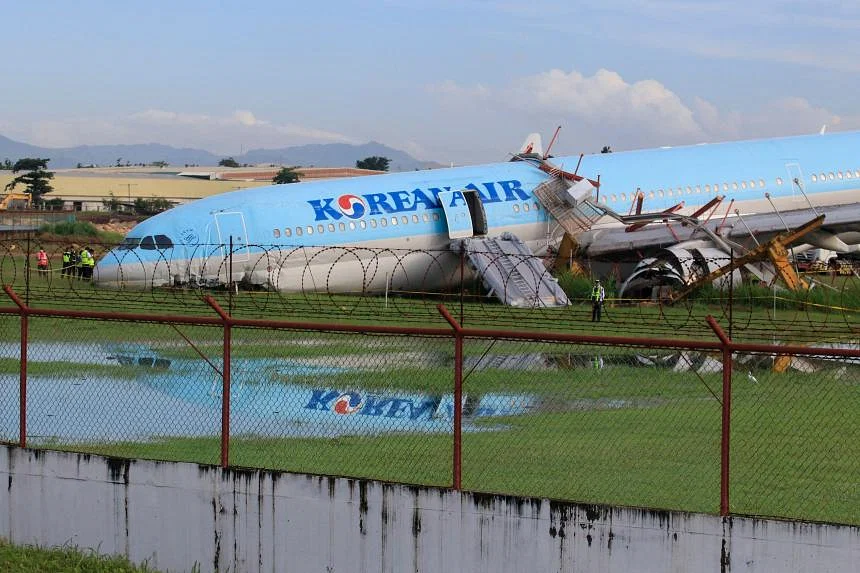
Flight 631 was written off after a runway excursion on 23 October.

23 October
Korean Air Flight 631 overruns the runway while landing after a hydraulic problem. Nobody was injured but the plane was written off.

27 October
A Canadair CL-415 fire-fighting aircraft of the Italian Protezione Civile crashes on Mount Etna, Sicily, during extinguishing operations. Two pilots on board die, after the impact of the hull on the Monte Calcinera ridge.

=== November ===
6 November
An ATR 42-500 of Precision Air, operating as Precision Air Flight 494, crashes into Lake Victoria while landing at Bukoba Airport from Dar Es Salaam Airport. The flight was carrying 39 passengers and 4 crew members; the crash resulted in 19 fatalities.

12 November
Two World War II-era aircraft, a B-17 Flying Fortress and a Bell P-63 Kingcobra, collided mid-air and crashed during the Wings Over Dallas airshow at Dallas Executive Airport in Dallas, Texas.

18 November
An Airbus A320neo of LATAM Chile, operating a domestic flight between Lima and Juliaca as LATAM Perú Flight 2213, collides with a fire engine which was on the runway during the flight's takeoff roll. All 102 passengers and 6 crew aboard escape unharmed. However, two firefighters were killed and one injured.

28 November
Rolls-Royce PLC announces it had run an AE2100 turboprop on hydrogen, towards hydrogen-powered aircraft, before another trial with a Pearl 15 turbofan.

=== December ===
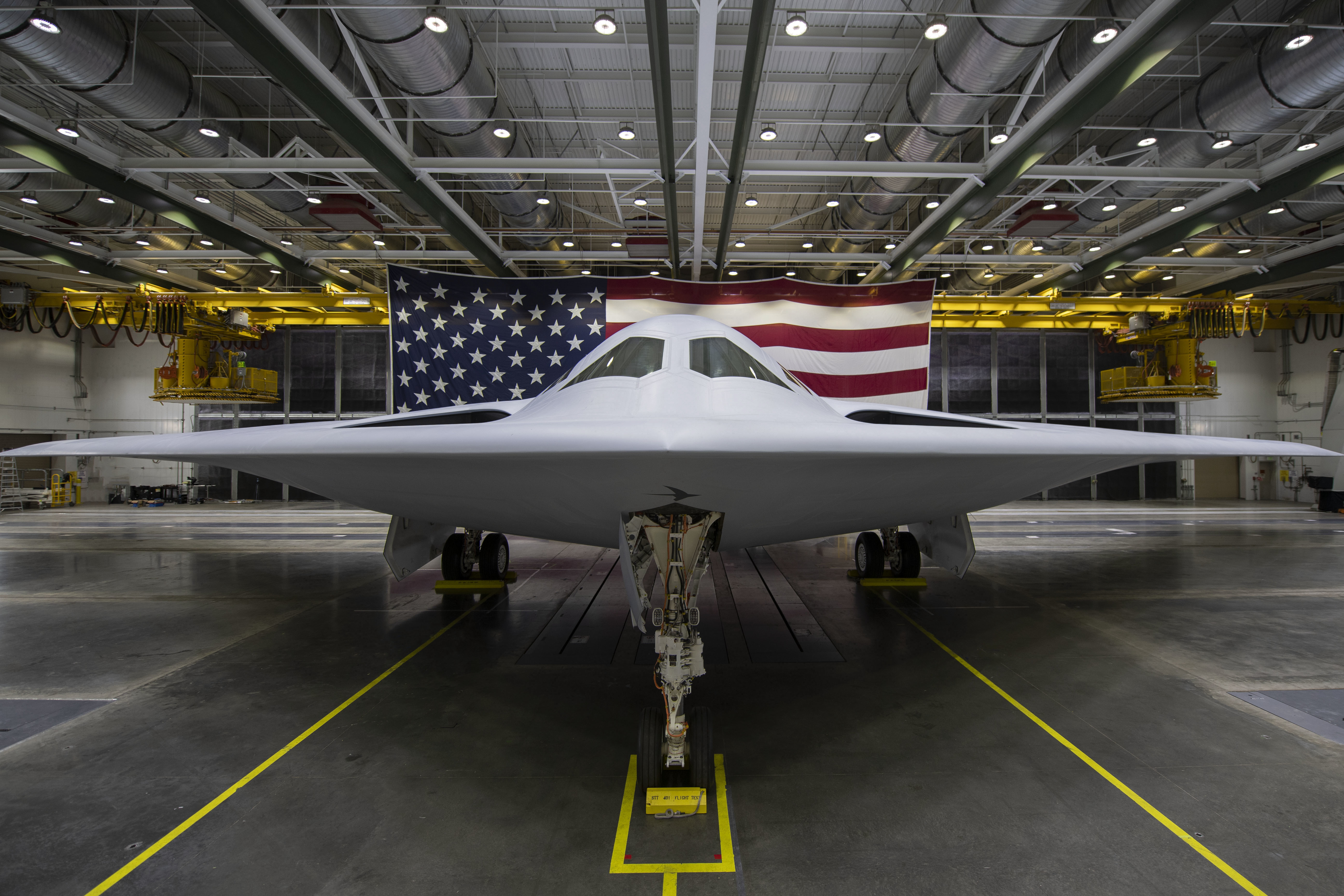
The first B-21 Raider is unveiled on 2 December.

2 December
The first completed B-21 Raider is publicly unveiled by Northrop Grumman and the USAF at Plant 42 in Palmdale, California.

5 December
The US Army selects the Bell V-280 Valor tiltrotor over the competing Sikorsky–Boeing SB-1 Defiant coaxial design for its FLRAA program to replace its 2,300 Sikorsky UH-60 Black Hawks.

21 December
A Chinese PLANAF Shenyang J-11 fighter intercepts a U.S. Air Force Boeing RC-135 electronic surveillance aircraft with about 30 people on board over the South China Sea, performing what the U.S. described as an "unsafe maneuver". The fighter came within 20 feet (6.1 m) of the RC-135's nose, forcing it to take evasive action.
The late December 2022 North American winter storm sweeps across the United States and Canada, resulting in the cancellation of over 10,000 flights.

== Orders and deliveries ==
Airbus booked 820 net orders in 2022 and delivered 661 aircraft, for a year-end backlog of 7,239; while Boeing booked 774 orders and delivered 480 aircraft for a backlog of 5,430.

== First flights ==
15 June - Airbus A321XLR

- 28 June - Gulfstream G800
- 19 July - KAI KF-21 Boramae
- 27 September - Eviation Alice

== Ceased operations ==
- 9 June - kulula.com

== Deadliest crash ==
Across all airline operations globally, there were 12 fatal accidents resulting in 229 fatalities in 2022. Accounting for more than half of those, the deadliest crash of this year was China Eastern Airlines Flight 5735, a Boeing 737 which crashed in Teng County, China, on 21 March, killing all 132 people on board. It is alleged that an argument took place in the cockpit, but the Chinese government has not disclosed the exact details of the conversation.
