= European Air Racing Championship =

Handicapped air race

The European Air Racing Championship is a handicapped air race arranged by the Royal Aero Club Records, Racing and Rally Association.

== History ==
No sooner had aircraft developed to the stage that they would stay airborne for predictable amounts of time, than pilots had started to pit their skills and aircraft against each other both personally and on a national basis.

=== Schneider Trophy ===
Whilst the Schneider Trophy is probably the epitome of air racing involving the most technically advanced aircraft, it soon became obvious that, with so many different types in development, there would have to be some form of handicapping of aircraft to level the playing field.

=== King's Cup Race ===
The modern-day handicapped air race began in 1922 and was sponsored by King George V — called the King's Cup Race. In 1931 the rules were re-written to allow for what might be termed amateur pilots to compete and those same rules still apply today. The King’s Cup was the first and only air race to receive royal patronage.

=== Records Racing and Rally Association ===
Whilst this was a British phenomenon, the handicapping concept has been used to stage races worldwide. Especially popular in the technologically superior Europe, it became known through the Royal Aero Club Records Racing and Rally Association. This organisation runs an annual programme of 14 to 18 races at seven to nine different venues, mainly in the UK but at least two or three in Europe.

=== European Championship ===
In 2000, the organisation launched a European Championship aimed at attracting a wider audience of European competitors. This championship is run within the Royal Aero Club RRR’s normal season of races but the champion is the pilot/navigator combination that scores the highest number of aggregate points over 6 races held at 3 different venues. These venues have included the UK, France, Spain, the Channel Isles, Ireland and the Isle of Man.

== Winners ==
Year	Pilot	Winning Aircraft
2000	Geoffrey Boot	Beagle Pup
2001	Robert Miller	Slingsby T67
2002	Robert Miller	Slingsby T67
2003	Peter Earp	Beech Baron E58
2004	John Kelsall	RV7
2005	John Kelsall	RV7
2006	Peter Earp	Beech Baron E58
2007	Peter Earp	Beech Baron E58
2008	Alistair Allan	SIAI Marchetti SF260
2009	Craig Beevers	SIAI Marchetti SF260
2010	Robert Callaway-Lewis	Auster
2011	Geoffrey Boot	SIAI Marchetti SF260
2012	David Moorman	CAP10B
2013	Dan Pangbourne	Grumman AA-5B Tiger
2014	John Kelsall	RV7
2015	Bob Ellis	RV8
