= Varandey Airport =

Airport located in Varandey, Russia

- IATA: VRI; ICAO: ULDW

Summary
- Airport type: Public
- Elevation AMSL: 6 ft / 2 m
- Coordinates: 68°50′52″N 058°11′55″E
- Interactive map of Varandey Airport

Runways
Direction	Length		Surface
Direction	ft	m	Surface
04/22	5.577	1.700	Concrete
- Sources: AirportNavFinder, DAFIF

Varandey Airport (IATA: VRI, ICAO: ULDW) is an airport in the Nenets Autonomous Okrug, Russia. It serves the Varandey settlement on the Arctic coast of the Nenets district and the development of the Prirazlomnoye oil field.

It is capable of accepting aircraft of the third class (An-24, An-26, L-410, Yak-40 and the like) and other types of aircraft of the 3rd class, helicopters of all types. The maximum take-off weight of an aircraft is 25 tons. Classification number of runway (PCN) 18 / F / D / Y / T.

The airport is used by Gazpromavia for delivery of personnel to the Prirazlomnaya OIRFP, where a helicopter platform operates since 2010, with primary connections to Arkhangelsk and Orenburg.

== Airlines and destinations ==
Airlines	Destinations
Utair	Arkhangelsk–Talagi

== Accidents and incidents ==
On 16 March 2005, Regional Airlines Flight 9288, an Antonov An-24RV (NATO reporting name "Coke"), crashed on approach to Varandey Airport, killing 28 of the 52 people on board.

== See also ==
- List of airports in Russia
