= AeroJames 01 Isatis =

French ultralight aircraft

01 Isatis

General information
- Type: Ultralight aircraft
- National origin: France
- Manufacturer: AeroJames
- Status: Production completed

History
- Introduction date: April 2009

The AeroJames 01 Isatis (named for the flowering plant) is a French ultralight aircraft, designed and produced by AeroJames of Ajaccio, Corsica. It was introduced at the Aero show held in Friedrichshafen in 2009. The aircraft is supplied as a complete ready-to-fly-aircraft.

By the beginning of 2018 company website was for sale, the company seems to have gone out of business and production ended.

== Design and development ==
The design is unusual in that the engine is mounted behind the cabin and drives the nose-mounted propeller though a carbon fibre extension driveshaft that is housed in a casing that runs between the two occupants. This allows a smaller and more pointed nose than with a nose-mounted engine and improves visibility.

The aircraft was designed to comply with the Fédération Aéronautique Internationale microlight rules. It features a strut-braced high-wing, a two-seats-in-side-by-side configuration enclosed cockpit, tricycle landing gear and a single engine in tractor configuration.

The aircraft is made from carbon fibre composites. Its 9.80 m (32.2 ft) span wing employs flaps. The standard engine used is a 100 hp (75 kW) BMW four-stroke, two-cylinder, air-cooled, horizontally-opposed motorcycle powerplant.

== Specifications (01 Isatis) ==
Data from Bayerl

General characteristics

- Crew: one
- Capacity: one passenger
- Wingspan: 9.80 m (32 ft 2 in)
- Wing area: 12.0 m^{2} (129 sq ft)
- Empty weight: 270 kg (595 lb)
- Gross weight: 472.5 kg (1,042 lb)
- Fuel capacity: 64 litres (14 imp gal; 17 US gal)
- Powerplant: 1 × BMW two cylinder, oil and air-cooled, four stroke, located behind the cockpit., 75 kW (101 hp)
- Propellers: 3-bladed composite

Performance

- Maximum speed: 270 km/h (170 mph, 150 kn)
- Cruise speed: 230 km/h (140 mph, 120 kn)
- Stall speed: 60 km/h (37 mph, 32 kn)
