= Airspeeder (racing series) =

Aircraft racing series

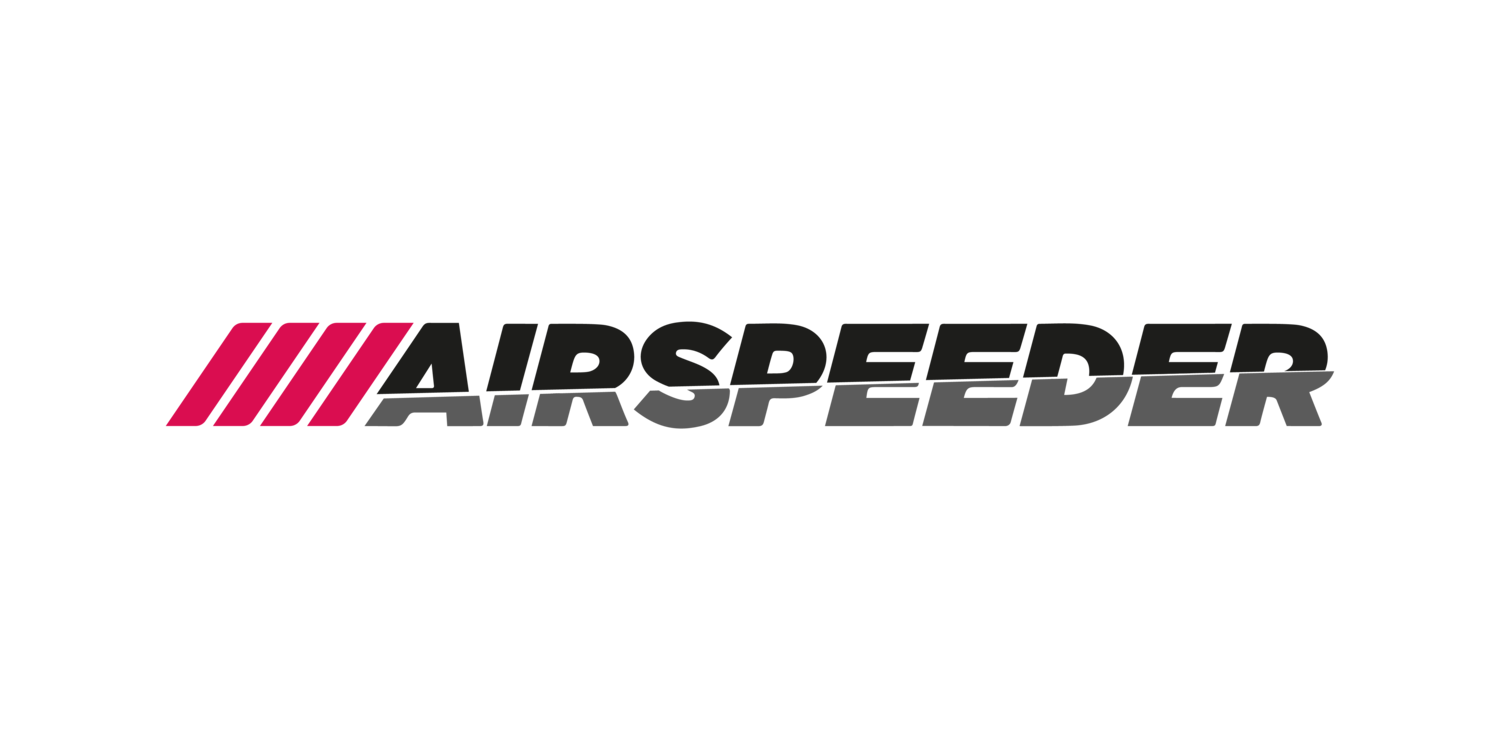
- Category: eVTOL air racing
- Country: United Kingdom (headquartered in London)
- Region: Global
- Inaugural season: 2022
- Official website: airspeeder.com

Airspeeder is an electric flying vehicle racing series based in London, United Kingdom. The aircraft, built by Alauda Aeronautics, use electric vertical take-off and landing (eVTOL) technology and are designed to be crewed by human pilots. The first remotely-piloted drag race between two Airspeeder craft took place in November 2021. A remotely-piloted racing series (Airspeeder EXA Series) began in 2022 with Zephatali Walsh named as the inaugural season champion.

== History ==
The concept for a human-piloted, flying vehicle racing series was developed by Matt Pearson. His company developed a prototype over the course of two years in a warehouse in Sydney, Australia. The craft, an eVTOL quadcopter, was debuted in December 2017.

The Airspeeder Mk3, an eight-rotor version of the vehicle, was unveiled in 2019. In April 2020, Airspeeder raised an undisclosed amount in a seed funding round led by Saltwater Capital, Jelix Ventures, Equals, and DHL. Throughout this time, Airspeeder craft made frequent test runs which were documented on the Airspeeder YouTube channel.

Whilst performing a demonstration flight at Goodwood Aerodrome, West Sussex on 4 July 2019 the remote pilot lost control of the 95 kg unmanned aircraft, an Alauda Airspeeder Mk II scale demonstrator.

After the loss of control had been confirmed by the remote pilot, the safety ‘kill switch’ was operated but had no effect. The unmanned aircraft then climbed to approximately 8,000 ft, entering controlled airspace at a holding point for flights arriving at Gatwick Airport, before its battery depleted and it fell to the ground. It crashed in a field of crops approximately 40m from occupied houses and 700m outside of its designated operating area. Fortunately, there were no injuries.

The AAIB found that the Airspeeder Mk II was not designed, built or tested to any recognisable engineering or airworthiness standards, and that its design and build quality were poor.

In June 2021, a successful remote test flight of an Airspeeder Mk3 octocopter craft took place in the South Australian desert. It was the first successful test flight. The first remotely-piloted drag race between two Airspeeder craft took place again in the South Australian desert in November 2021. Also in 2021, Airspeeder received additional funding from Telstra. In January 2022, Airspeeder announced the first three pilots (Fabio Tischler, Emily Duggan, and Zephatali Walsh) who would remotely operate craft for the Airspeeder EXA series. The inaugural edition of the EXA series is planned to take place in 2022 and consist of three remotely-operated races in three different countries.

In March 2022, Alauda Aeronautics announced it will establish a new factory at the new Australia Space Park in Adelaide, where it says it will make eVTOLs ahead of races in 2024. The South Australian Government announced it will invest $20 million in the Space Park, while the Federal Government is providing an additional $20 million in funding.

In May 2022, Airspeeder conducted its first eVTOL circuit race in Lochiel, South Australia.

On December 9, 2023, Zephatali Walsh secured victory in the Airspeeder EXA Series 2023 Championship, in the first three eVTOL Speeder race held at Stonefield Airfield, South Australia. Competing in challenging wet conditions, Walsh outpaced opponents Lexie Janson and Bruno Senna.

== Vehicles ==
The Mk3 and Mk4 Airspeeder versions are designed for racing with eight propellers and a carbon-fiber composite body. Each vehicle is also equipped with a collision avoidance system that uses lidar, radar, and machine vision to avoid in-air crashes. Mk3 speeders are designed to be operated remotely while Mk4 speeders are intended to be flown with pilots in the cockpit.

Mk2

The Airspeeder Mk2 remote-controlled uncrewed two-meter (excluding propellers) ¾ subscale model test flyer was first flown June 23, 2018. In 2019, whilst performing a demonstration flight at Goodwood Festival of Speed, the remote pilot lost control of the 95 kg scale demonstrator. After a loss of control had been confirmed by the remote pilot, the safety ‘kill switch’ was operated but had no effect. Following the crash, the Mk2 programme was terminated following an AAIB investigation.

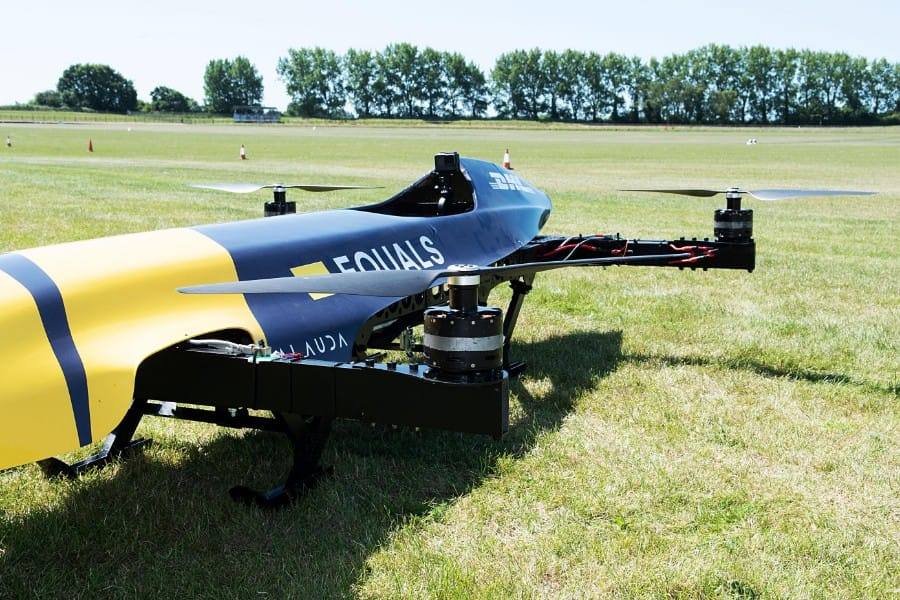
Airspeeder Mk2 at Goodwood Festival of Speed 2019

Mk3

The Mk3 Airspeeder was specifically designed and built by Alauda Aeronautics for remote operation, utilizing eVTOL technology to maximize precision and control for skilled operators.

When operated without pilots, the Airspeeder Mk3 weighs around 100 kilograms (220 pounds) and can achieve top speeds of approximately 200 kilometers per hour (124 miles per hour). These Airspeeders are powered by electric batteries, providing 10 to 15 minutes of power before needing to be replaced by pit crews during races. During the first EXA Race season, the Mk3 recorded an acceleration of 0–60 mph (0–97 kph) in 5–7 seconds and a top speed of 63.3 mph (102 kph) under pilot control by Zephatali Walsh.

Weighing 132 kg (with batteries) and 95 kg (bare structure), the Mk3 combines lightweight construction with powerful capabilities for remote operation. The Mk3 features a ‘slide and lock’ system for battery replacement to make pit-stops quicker for EXA race teams. Notably, Felix Pierron, the Head of Design at Alauda Aeronautics, played a crucial role in conceptualizing and developing the original designs for both the Airspeeder Mk3 and Mk4.

Mk4

The Airspeeder Mk4 is an upcoming crewed electric vertical take-off and landing (eVTOL) aircraft built by Alauda Aeronautics in South Australia, designed for high-performance racing. The Mk4 is the next-generation craft designed for human pilots seated in the cockpit, harnessing their expertise and skills to navigate the challenges of the course.

Weighing 950 kg, it is expected to have a top speed of 225 mph (362 kph). The Mk4 will be powered by a 1,340 bhp 'Thunderstrike Hydrogen Turbogenerator'. Crewed races are scheduled for 2024, with engine testing in progress in Adelaide, Southern Australia.

== Performance evolution ==
- 2021 - Without pilots, Airspeeder Mk3 weighed around 100 kilograms (220 pounds) and could reach speeds of around 200 kilometers per hour (124 miles per hour). The speeders were powered by electric batteries that could provide 10 to 15 minutes of power. Batteries were intended to be replaced mid-race by pit crews.
- 2023 - With pilot, Airspeeder Mk4 has a take-off weight (MTOW) of 950 kg, and can achieve a top speed of 360 kph (225 mph) in 30 seconds from a standing start. 1,000 kW (1,340 horsepower) Thunderstrike Hydrogen Turbogenerator has a range of 300 km (188 miles).

Airspeeder MK3 In South Australia Test Flight (2021)

== Race technology ==
The Airspeeder race series is using technology development to not only revolutionize the racing experience but it also has broader implications for the eVTOL and aviation industry, particularly in the realm of advanced air mobility and urban traffic management.

Digital Race Tracks

In September 2021, Telstra Purple joined with Airspeeder to develop a race-control system that transmits real-time telemetry data from vehicles to ground crews, improving safety and performance during Airspeeder EXA Series races. The integration of advanced radio-frequency technology gives an immersive experience for pilots to navigate through augmented reality gates, helping pilots see the GPS positioned track. Telstra Purple developed and tested this virtual race-control system with AWS throughout 2022, transmitting telemetry and track graphics with low latency to pilot-control stations at the Lochiel race track. Telstra also developed the first iteration of the pilot simulator which was displayed at Telstra’s Vantage festival in Sydney, Australia in September 2022.

Data Intelligence

In March 2023, Airspeeder announced Intel as Official Intelligence Partner for the Airspeeder Series, utilizing their processors to enhance the Mk3 and Mk4 craft. The partnership aims to transform the racing experience, making it more immersive and dynamic for pilots and audiences. The collaboration with Intel opens up possibilities for urban mobility and redefines the future of private air mobility.

== Pilots ==
In January 2022, Airspeeder announced the selection of four pilots for the Airspeeder EXA series: Fabio Tischler, Emily Duggan, Lexie Janson, and Zephatali Walsh. These pilots would remotely operate Airspeeder crafts in the upcoming EXA racing series.

Zephatali Walsh has experience competing in the Drone Champions League, and Fabio Tischler has worked on drone filming projects. Airspeeder has said the selection of pilots with different racing backgrounds is intended to help the public see themselves as future eVTOL pilots.

In March 2022, Bruno Senna, a seasoned Brazilian racing driver, joined Airspeeder as a development pilot and global ambassador. Working closely with Airspeeder's team of engineers, Senna contributes to the refinement of the company's flying car technology and safety systems.

To prepare for the races, the pilots undergo hours of training on Telstra-built simulators that use real-world Airspeeder physics to simulate racing environments.

== Race format ==
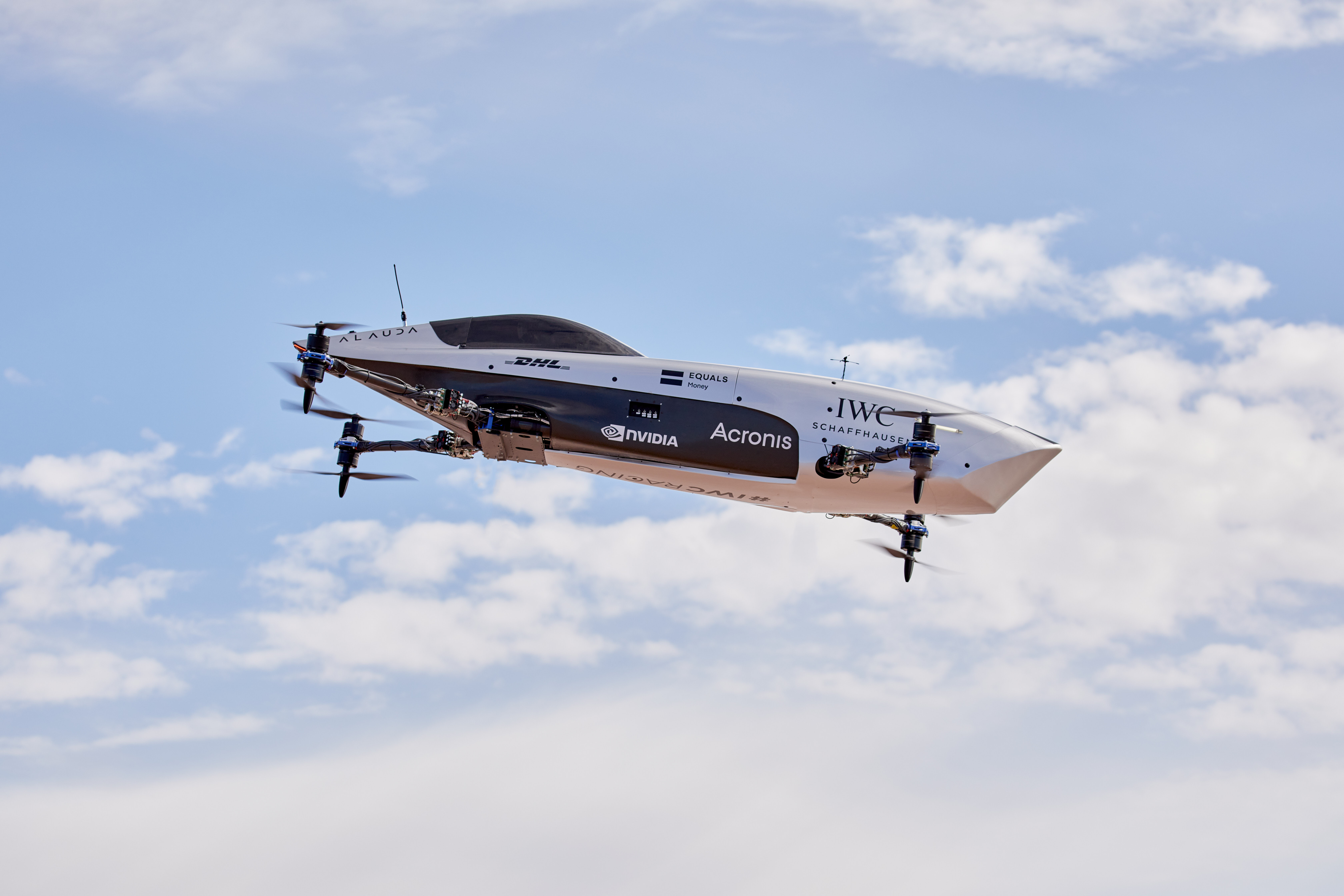
An Mk3 Speeder in South Australia in 2021.

EXA Series

In May 2021, Airspeeder introduced the EXA Series, a remotely controlled racing series where Speeders are controlled and raced remotely by RPAS qualified pilots with various drone racing and motorsport backgrounds. The premise of EXA is to safely hold a race event for eVTOL vehicles ahead of crewed racing in 2024.

The first EXA races were held in 2022 in Lochiel and Snowtown, South Australia and supported by the South Australian Government. The first race weekend consisted of two rounds of qualifying time trials, followed by a multi-craft eVTOL circuit race. The EXA remotely piloted race serves as the development and feeder series for the Airspeeder fully crewed Grand Prix's starting in 2024.

For the May 2022 Airspeeder EXA Series race, pilots operated their Airspeeders remotely via radio frequency and using an augmented reality display. These augmented reality ‘gates’ with live telemetry supported by Telstra Purple, assisted the pilots in navigating the course. These GPS-positioned gates govern the layout of the track and are displayed to pilots via the AR overlay along with race data. For the inaugural race, pilots raced on a 1 km course above the salt flats of Lake Lochiel near Adelaide, South Australia. They used remote piloting stations that gave them views from the cockpit similar to what on-board pilots would see. The race was run in two sessions with pit stops for swapping batteries. Walsh won the close overall contest despite Tischler recording the fastest lap time of 39.784 seconds and the fastest recorded speed of 102 kilometers per hour or about 55 knots.

Although Airspeeder has yet to name international racing locations, it has previously targeted desert locales like Coober Pedy in South Australia or the Mojave Desert in the U.S. state of California. Airspeeder has also noted that races could theoretically take place in any terrain on "sky tracks" that utilize augmented reality.

== Results and standings ==
EXA Results

Round	Season 1	Pilots	Winner	Location	Country	Track	Distance	Date
1	Drag Race, SA	(United Kingdom) Andrew Jackson (Australia) Jonathan Routley	(Australia) Jonathan Routley	Flinders Ranges, South Australia	Australia	eVTOL Drag Race	300m	2 October 2021
2	Airspeeder EXA: Race 1	(Australia) Zephatali Walsh (Germany) Fabio Tischler	(Australia) Zephatali Walsh	Lochiel, South Australia	Australia	eVTOL Circuit Race 1	1 km	20 May 2022
3	Airspeeder EXA: Race 2	(Australia) Zephatali Walsh (Germany) Fabio Tischler (Republic of Ireland) Lexie Janson	(Australia) Zephatali Walsh	Snowtown, South Australia	Australia	eVTOL Circuit Race 2	1 km	15 October 2022
4	Airspeeder EXA: Race 3	(Australia) Zephatali Walsh (Brazil) Bruno Senna (Republic of Ireland) Lexie Janson	(Australia) Zephatali Walsh	Steinfeld, South Australia	Australia	eVTOL Circuit Race 2	1.1 km	9 December 2023

== Broadcast and documentary series ==
Airspeeder films all of its races for a broadcast and digital audience. In order to capture racing quad-copters that fly almost 90 mph, Airspeeder manages the entire broadcast ecosystem for its events, including the timing and length of races. The races are not broadcast live; they are post-produced for broadcast.

Aurora Media Worldwide was selected as host broadcaster for the first Airspeeder EXA race, producing race coverage and a supporting documentary series, combining sport and technology stories. The near-live broadcast was presented by Nicki Shields and Brazilian racing driver Bruno Senna from a studio in London.

After the first season in 2022, a six-part TV series was produced called Road to Flying Car Racing, which documented the process of creating a brand-new racing series. The first episode premiered on March 16, 2023 on Fox Sports Australia and Kayo Sports after Airspeeder secured a two-year rights deal.

In April 2023, Airspeeder partnered with DAZN to bring two more original programme series about the sport and technology to its global audience.
