= Didier Delsalle =

French pilot

- Born: Didier Delsalle; May 6, 1957 (age 69); Aix-en-Provence, France
- Occupation: Test pilot

Didier Delsalle (born May 6, 1957) is a former fighter pilot and helicopter test pilot. He became the first and as yet only person to take a helicopter (the Eurocopter AS350 Squirrel) to the summit of Mount Everest, when he hovered low enough over the peak to touch one skid to its snowpack for 3 minutes and 50 seconds, on May 14, 2005.

== Career ==
Didier Delsalle joined the French Air Force in 1979 as a fighter pilot. Two years later he became a helicopter pilot, participating in search and rescue operations for the next ten years. Delsalle then worked for five years as a test pilot and instructor at the EPNER test pilot school in Istres, France. Delsalle was then hired by Eurocopter, the world's largest helicopter supplier and a subsidiary of the European Aeronautic Defence and Space Company, as chief test pilot responsible for small helicopters of the single-engine family, and later for the larger NH90 helicopters that were being developed (now in service) for numerous armed forces.

== Mount Everest ==
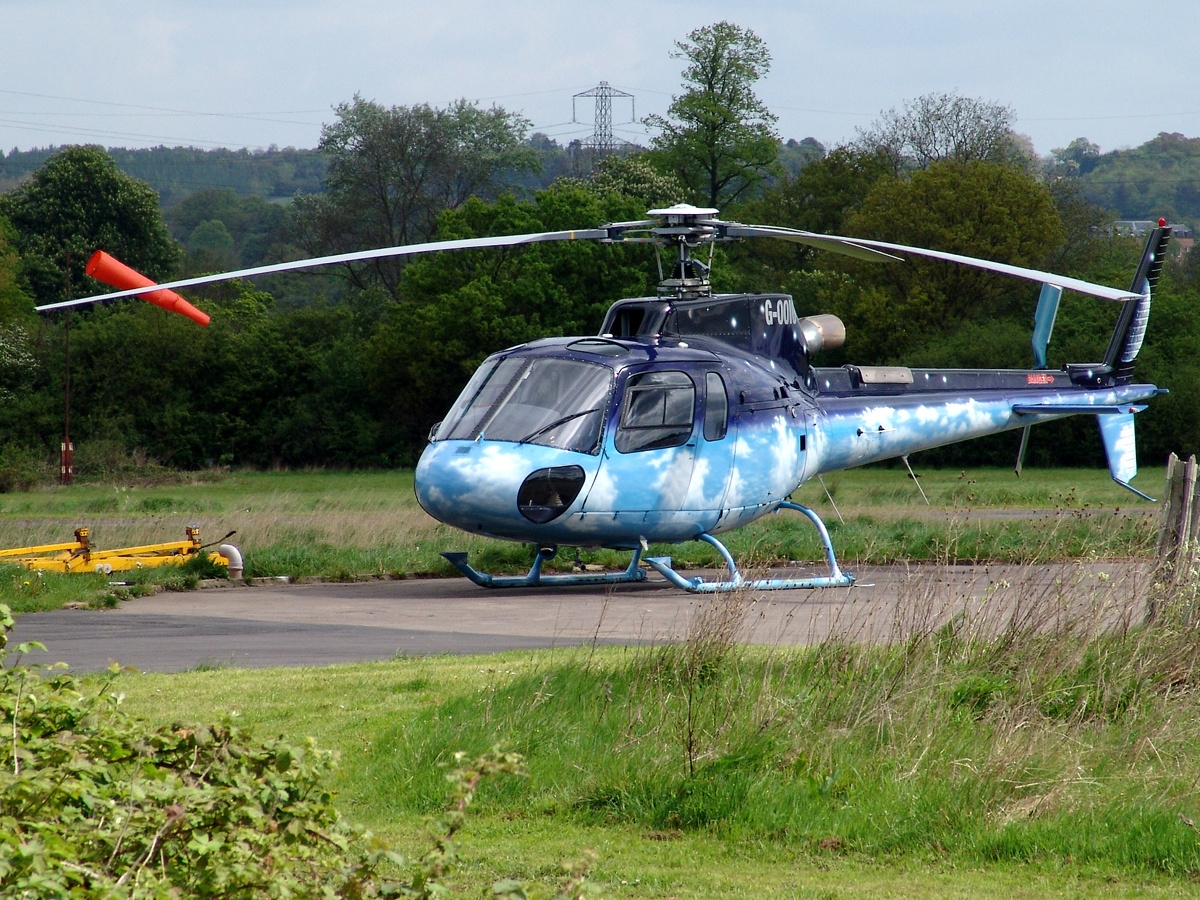
Photo of a Eurocopter AS350 B3 "Squirrel"

On May 14, 2005, at 07:08 NPT, Delsalle set the world record for highest altitude landing of a helicopter when his Eurocopter AS350 Squirrel briefly touched down on the 8,848 m (29,029 ft) summit of Mount Everest. The flight and the summit landing were recorded by a multitude of cameras and other equipment to validate the record. After hovering over the summit with one skid on its snowpack for 3 minutes and 50 seconds, Delsalle returned to the Tenzing-Hillary Airport at Lukla, Nepal.

This accomplishment had required extensive testing on site, especially because of the low atmospheric pressure available to the helicopter rotors, winds over 299 km/h (186 mph) at these altitudes, and oxygen depletion for both Delsalle and his helicopter's engine. Delsalle had to find areas of downdrafts and updrafts to complete the flight, stating: "I found an updraft so strong that I could rise up with almost no power."

Delsalle repeated the Everest summit landing the next day, May 15, 2005, to prove that the previous day had not been simple luck. Conditions the second day were much more difficult, but Delsalle chose not to wait any longer so as not to squander the opportunity for 'conventional' climbers waiting to summit Everest during the limited good weather conditions available in May.

Delsalle used a virtually standard version of the Eurocopter, only removing unnecessary elements, such as passenger seats, to reduce the standard weight by 120 kg (265 lb) and thus extend the fuel range by an additional hour.

== World records for helicopter flight ==
- Record of highest Landing, 8,848 m (29,030 ft), on the summit of Mount Everest, set May 14, 2005.
- Record of highest take-off, 8,848 m (29,030 ft), from the summit of Mount Everest, set May 14, 2005.
- Speed record of ascension to 3,000 m (9,843 ft), 2 min 21 sec, set April 14, 2005.
- Speed record of ascension to 6,000 m (19,690 ft), 5 min 06 sec, set April 14, 2005.
- Speed record of ascension to 9,000 m (29,530 ft), 9 min 26 sec, set April 14, 2005.
