= Regional Airlines Flight 9288 =

2005 aviation accident

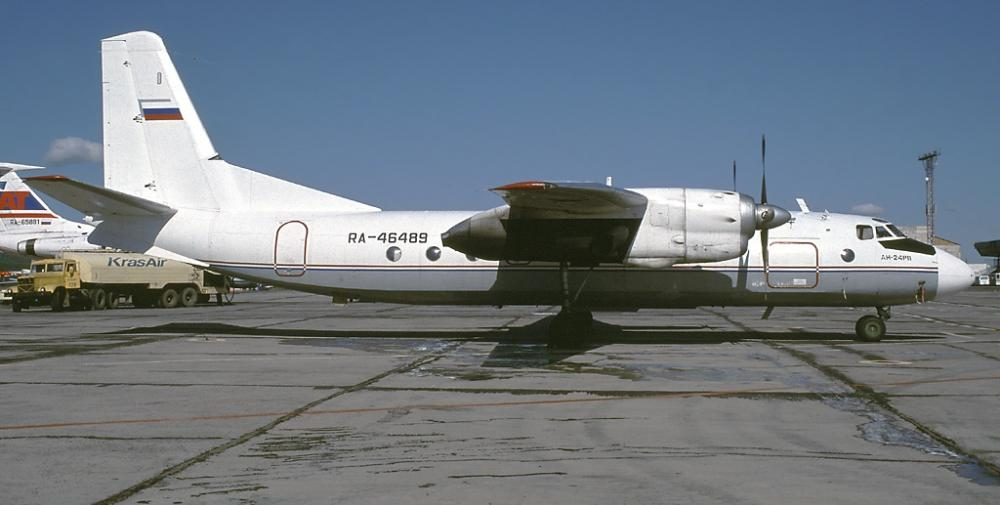
- RA-46489, the aircraft involved in the crash, photographed in 2003

Accident
- Date: 16 March 2005
- Summary: Controlled flight into terrain following stall
- Site: Varandey Airport, Nenetskiy Avtonomnyy Okrug, Russia

Aircraft
- Aircraft type: Antonov An-24RV
- Operator: Regional Airlines
- Registration: RA-46489
- Flight origin: Usinsk Airport, Komi, Russia
- Destination: Varandey Airport, Nenetskiy Avtonomnyy Okrug, Russia
- Occupants: 52
- Passengers: 45
- Crew: 7
- Fatalities: 28
- Survivors: 24

On 16 March 2005, Regional Airlines Flight 9288 crashed on approach to Varandey Airport in Russia's Nenetskiy Avtonomnyy Okrug, killing 28 of the 52 people on board.

== Accident ==
Regional Airlines Flight 9288 was an Antonov An-24RV making a non-scheduled Russian domestic passenger flight on 16 March 2005 from Usinsk Airport in Komi to Varandey Airport in Nenetskiy Avtonomnyy Okrug with seven crew members and 45 passengers aboard. On approach to Varandey Airport, the crew allowed the An-24RV's speed to drop and its nose to rise until in stalled. At 13:53, the aircraft struck a hill, crashed about 5 kilometers (3.1 miles) from the airport, and burned, killing 28 people (two crew members and 26 passengers).

The aircraft's airspeed and angle-of-attack indicators may have malfunctioned, making it difficult for the crew to monitor flight parameters accurately.

== Aircraft ==
The aircraft was a twin-engine Antonov An-24RV, manufacturer's serial number 27308107. It had first flown in 1972 and was registered as RA-46489. Regional Airlines had leased it from Kuzbassaviafrakht (Kuzbass Aero Freight).
