= British Airways Flight 268 =

2005 aviation incident

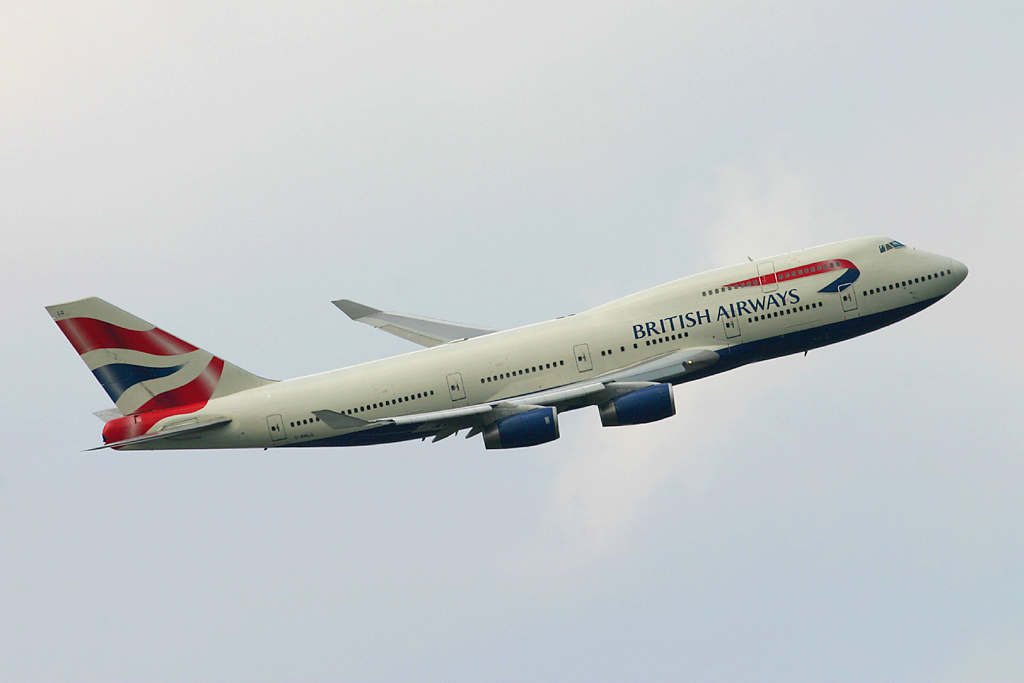
- G-BNLG, the aircraft involved in the incident, photographed in 2004

Incident
- Date: 20 February 2005
- Summary: Engine fire, shutdown, and flameout, after take-off
- Site: Los Angeles, California, United States, departing LAX (engine flameout) Manchester Airport, Manchester, United Kingdom (emergency landing)

Aircraft
- Aircraft type: Boeing 747-436
- Aircraft name: Whale Rider
- Operator: British Airways
- IATA flight No.: BA268
- ICAO flight No.: BAW268
- Call sign: SPEEDBIRD 268
- Registration: G-BNLG
- Flight origin: Los Angeles International Airport, Los Angeles, California
- Destination: Heathrow Airport, London, United Kingdom
- Occupants: 370
- Passengers: 352
- Crew: 18
- Fatalities: 0
- Survivors: 370

British Airways Flight 268 was a regularly scheduled flight from Los Angeles to London. On February 20, 2005, the innermost left engine emitted flames, triggered by an engine compressor stall almost immediately after takeoff. The Boeing 747-400 continued to fly across the United States, Canada, and the Atlantic Ocean with its three remaining engines. The flight then made an emergency landing at Manchester Airport, after experiencing difficulty balancing the remaining fuel between the 4 fuel tanks.

== Flight incident ==
The flight took off at about 9:24 p.m. on 20 February 2005. When the aircraft, a four-engine Boeing 747-436, was around 300 feet (100 m) into the air, flames burst out of its number 2 engine, a result of engine surge. The pilots shut the engine down. Air traffic control expected the plane to return to the airport and deleted its flight plan. However, after consulting with the airline dispatcher, the pilots decided to continue on their flight plan "and get as far as we can" rather than dump 70 tonnes of fuel and land. The 747 is certified to fly on three engines. Having reached the East Coast of North America, the assessment was that the plane could continue safely. The cross-Atlantic journey encountered less favourable winds than predicted and the requested altitude was not available over the Atlantic. Upon reaching the United Kingdom, the crew experienced difficulty balancing the remaining fuel, the captain then declared an emergency and landed at Manchester Airport.

== Controversy ==
A safety controversy ensued; the Federal Aviation Administration (FAA) accused the carrier of flying an "unairworthy" plane across the Atlantic Ocean. The FAA proposed fining the carrier, British Airways $25,000. British Airways lodged an appeal on the grounds that they were flying according to United Kingdom Civil Aviation Authority (CAA) rules (which are derived from International Civil Aviation Organization standards). In the end, the FAA told British Airways it was dropping the case based on assurances that airline changes will "preclude the type of extended operation that was the subject of this enforcement action." British Airways said they had not changed their procedures and according to Flight International the FAA said that they "will recognise the CAA's determination that the aircraft was not unairworthy".

== Investigation ==
The investigation report recommended that British Airways revise its training of crews in three-engine operation fuel management procedures.
