= Erika Slezak =

American actress

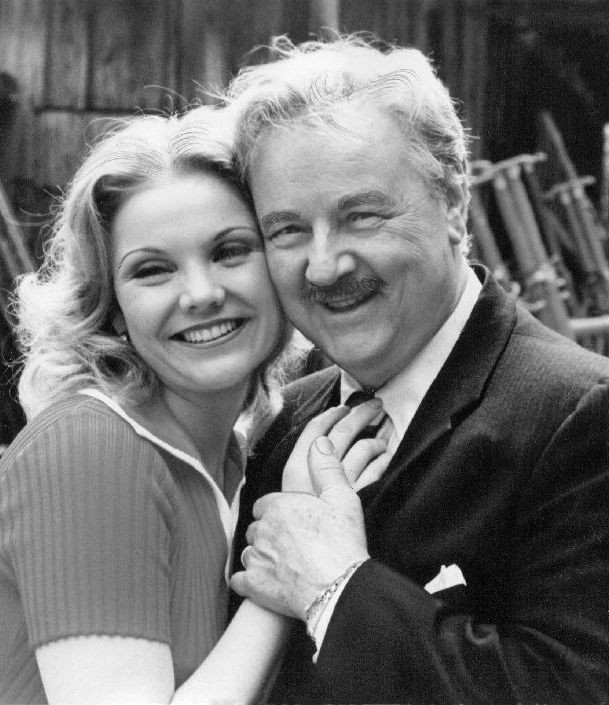
- Erika Slezak with her father, Walter Slezak, on the set of One Life to Live (1974)
- Born: August 5, 1946 (age 80); Hollywood, California, U.S.
- Education: Royal Academy of Dramatic Arts
- Occupation: Actress
- Years active: 1971–present
- Known for: Victoria Lord
- Television: One Life to Live
- Spouses: Robert Daniel Mooney (m. 1968–1971) Brian Davies (m. 1978)
- Children: 2
- Father: Walter Slezak
- Relatives: Margarete Slezak (aunt); Leo Slezak (grandfather)
- Awards: Daytime Emmy Award (1984, 1986, 1992, 1995, 1996, 2005); Soap Opera Digest Award (2002)
- Website: www.erikaslezak.com

Erika Alma Slezak (/ˈsleɪzæk/; born August 5, 1946) is an American actress, best known for her role as Victoria "Viki" Lord on the American daytime soap opera One Life to Live from 1971 through the television finale in 2012 and again in the online revival in 2013. She is one of the longest-serving serial actors in American media. For her portrayal of Viki, she won six Daytime Emmy Awards, the most of any daytime drama actress.

== Life and career ==
Erika Slezak had a theatrical background, working in repertory theatre after graduating from RADA. During her years in repertory theatre, she played a wide variety of roles, including Electra in Electra, Hedda in Hedda Gabler, Charlotte Corday in Marat/Sade, Desdemona in Othello, Queen Elizabeth in Mary Stuart and Marian in The Music Man. After graduating from RADA, Slezak joined the Milwaukee Repertory Company at age 20 as a lead, and remained with the company for three seasons. She spent a season in Houston, where she performed in several productions, including the role of Elvira in Noël Coward's Blithe Spirit with Margaret Hamilton. After Houston, Slezak took a break and planned to spend a few weeks visiting her parents in Switzerland. That break turned into roughly seven months before she was asked to perform Desdemona once again in Othello.

Slezak had previously been put on tape for the role of nurse Mary Kennicott on the daytime soap opera All My Children, and on March 16, 1971, she auditioned for One Life to Live, reading opposite Bernard Grant, who played Steve Burke. Slezak was not told that she was auditioning for the role of Victoria Lord. Present at the audition were OLTL producer Doris Quinlan, casting director Joan D'Incecco and series creator Agnes Nixon. Slezak learned that she had been cast as Victoria "Viki" Lord and was told she would begin work the following day, March 17, 1971. Slezak was the third actress to portray Viki; Gillian Spencer originated the role when One Life to Live premiered in 1968 and was succeeded by Joanne Dorian in 1970. During Slezak's tenure, Christine Jones temporarily portrayed Viki while Slezak was on maternity leave, and Judith Barcroft and during a later absence. Slezak had no previous television experience, and longtime One Life to Live director David Pressman helped her adjust her stage-trained acting style to performing for television. In 1974, Slezak appeared opposite her father, actor Walter Slezak, when he guest-starred in four episodes of One Life to Live as Viki's godfather, Lazlo Braedecker. Slezak's husband, actor Brian Davies, also appeared on One Life to Live, portraying Scott Edgar in 1983, and Danton Gordon in 1989.

During Slezak's early years on One Life to Live, she portrayed Viki's alternate personality, Niki Smith, only in flashbacks and other characters' recollections; Niki later returned as an active character. In 1984, Slezak won her first Daytime Emmy Award for Outstanding Lead Actress in a Drama Series for her portrayal of Viki. In 1985, Niki Smith returned as an active alternate personality, allowing Slezak to portray both Viki and Niki in the storyline. In 1986, Slezak won her second Daytime Emmy Award for Outstanding Lead Actress in a Drama Series. In 1987, Viki had an out-of-body experience during brain surgery in a storyline in which she visited Heaven and encountered deceased loved ones. In 1988, Slezak portrayed Viki and her Old West ancestor, Virginia "Ginny" Fletcher, in a time-travel storyline.

In 1990, Viki suffered a stroke in a major storyline that required Slezak to portray the character's physical and speech impairments during her recovery. In 1992, Slezak won her third Daytime Emmy Award for Outstanding Lead Actress in a Drama Series. In 1995, Slezak portrayed Viki with several additional alternate personalities in an expanded dissociative identity disorder storyline. In 1995, Slezak won her fourth Daytime Emmy Award for Outstanding Lead Actress in a Drama Series. In 1996, Slezak won her fifth Daytime Emmy Award for Outstanding Lead Actress in a Drama Series. In 2000, Slezak portrayed Viki through a breast cancer storyline, for which she researched the illness and consulted with breast cancer survivors in preparing for the role. In 2004, Viki underwent a heart transplant after her husband, Ben Davidson, died while comatose and his heart was donated to her. In 2005, Slezak won her sixth Daytime Emmy Award for Outstanding Lead Actress in a Drama Series.

In 2008, Slezak reprised Viki's visit to Heaven as part of One Life to Live's 40th anniversary, with series creator Agnes Nixon appearing as "The Creator." In 2011, One Life to Live marked Slezak's 40th anniversary as Viki with a special episode devoted to the character and her history on the series. In 2012, Slezak remained with One Life to Live through the conclusion of its ABC run, appearing as Viki in the series' final network episode on January 13. In 2013, Slezak reprised the role of Viki when One Life to Live was revived as an online series. Slezak also appeared as herself on The Rosie O'Donnell Show, Intimate Portrait and The View. In 2019, she was interviewed for an episode of 20/20 about the stalking and murder of actress Rebecca Schaeffer, who had appeared on One Life to Live in the 1980s. In 1996, Slezak portrayed Jean Roberts in the television film Full Circle, based on the novel by Danielle Steel. In 2018, Slezak guest-starred on The Resident. In 2019, Slezak appeared as Helen in the film Guest Artist. In 2019 and 2023, Slezak guest-starred on Blue Bloods. In 2021, Slezak appeared in the Hallmark television film Next Stop, Christmas. In 2025, Slezak returned to daytime television as Veronica "Ronnie" Bard on General Hospital, her first daytime role since One Life to Live.

== Personal life ==
Slezak married Robert Daniel Mooney in 1968 in Milwaukee and divorced in 1971. She married Brian Davies on April 4, 1978, and is the mother of two children, Michael and Amanda. In 2003, Amanda Davies played a teenaged version of her mother's character Victoria in flashback scenes on One Life to Live. Amanda Davies died on January 29, 2024.

== Awards ==
Slezak has won six Daytime Emmy Awards in the category of "Outstanding Lead Actress in a Drama Series" out of nine nominations for her role as Victoria. Nominated in 1983, 1988, and 2012, she won in 1984, 1986, 1992, 1995, 1996 and 2005, making the record for most wins by an actress and, along with Justin Deas, is second to 8-time winner Anthony Geary, for the most wins for playing one character. Additionally, Slezak won the Soap Opera Digest Award for Favorite Couple with Mark Derwin in 2000.

Daytime Emmy Award wins

Year	Award
1984	Outstanding Lead Actress in a Drama Series for One Life to Live
1986	Outstanding Lead Actress in a Drama Series for One Life to Live
1992	Outstanding Lead Actress in a Drama Series for One Life to Live
1995	Outstanding Lead Actress in a Drama Series for One Life to Live
1996	Outstanding Lead Actress in a Drama Series for One Life to Live
2005	Outstanding Lead Actress in a Drama Series for One Life to Live

Soap Opera Digest Award wins

Year	Award
2000	Favorite Couple for One Life to Live (shared with Mark Derwin)

== Filmography ==
Year	Title	Role	Notes
1971–2013	One Life to Live	Victoria Lord	Series regular
1977	A.M. Chicago	Self	Episode dated November 3, 1977
1978	Donahue	Self	Episode dated March 21, 1978
1978–83	Family Feud	Self–Celebrity contestant	3 episodes
1996	Full Circle	Jean Roberts	Made-for-TV movie directed by Bethany Rooney
1996–2002	The Rosie O'Donnell Show	Self	4 episodes
2000–02	Intimate Portrait	Self	Episodes: "Linda Dano", "Erika Slezak"
2003–2012	The View	Self	4 episodes
2018	The Resident	Dr. Eileen Jacoby	Episode: "Haunted"
2019	Guest Artist	Helen	Drama film directed by Timothy Busfield
2019	20/20	Self	Episode: "Your Biggest Fan"
2019, 2022	Blue Bloods	Donna Duvall	Episodes: "Identity" and "Nothing Sacred"
2021	Next Stop, Christmas	Aunt Myrtle	Made-for-TV movie directed by Dustin Rikert
2025	General Hospital	Veronica Bard	Role held from September 26 to November 6, 2025
