= Cyril O'Reilly =

American actor (born 1958)

- Born: Cyril J. O'Reilly; Los Angeles, California, U.S.
- Other name: Joe Ready
- Occupations: Actor; writer; producer
- Years active: 1980–present

Cyril J. O'Reilly is an American film and television actor, writer and producer.

== Life and career ==
O'Reilly was born in Los Angeles, California, one of three children born to Patrick Joseph O'Reilly, a Deputy Director of the Peace Corps, and his wife, Harriet (nee Rothwell). He has worked in Hollywood for nearly three decades, and he is known for playing a reluctant vampire in Dance of the Damned and for his role as Tim Cavanaugh in the teen sex comedies Porky's and Porky's II: The Next Day.

He co-starred in the 1981 television movie Splendor in the Grass with Melissa Gilbert. In 2007, the two performed in the television movie Sacrifices of the Heart. His other film work has included roles in Airplane!, The Cool Surface, and Navy SEALs. He has appeared in a variety of television programs, including M*A*S*H, ER, Star Trek: Deep Space Nine, The X-Files, Beverly Hills, 90210, St. Elsewhere, Hunter, and Murder, She Wrote.

== Filmography ==
=== Film ===
Year	Title	Role	Notes
1980	Airplane!	Bill	
1981	Bloody Birthday	Paul	
1981	Porky's	Tim Cavanaugh	
1983	Porky's II: The Next Day	Tim Cavanaugh	
1984	Purple Hearts	Zuma	
1985	Means and Ends	Jeff	
1989	Dance of the Damned	The Vampire	
1990	Navy Seals	Homer Rexer	
1991	Across the Tracks	Coach Ryder	
1993	Philadelphia Experiment II	Decker	
1994	The Cool Surface	Gary/Eric	
1995	Excessive Force II: Force on Force	Deacon	
1995	Bloodfist VII: Manhunt	Tubbs	
1996	Shadow of a Scream	Don Holroyd	
1996	Carnosaur 3: Primal Species	Dolan	
1996	The Cottonwood	Carlo Shain	
1996	Midnight Blue	Dude	
1997	T.N.T.	Miles	
1997	Eruption!	Sam Conway	
1998	The Protector	Tony Angeleno	
1998	Black Dog	Vince	
1999	Forever Fabulous	Cop	
2001	Air Rage	Colonel John Sykes	
2002	Stages	Scott	Short
2003	Flush	Frank	Short
2022	Pig Killer	Leonard	
2023	Scalper	Corman	
2024	H.P. Lovecraft's the Old Ones	Buck 'Cabby' Hooper	
2024	Unspeakable: Beyond the Wall of Sleep	Bill Jackson	
2025	Death 4 Dinner	Andrew Rutherford	
2025	Dorothea	John Cabrera	

=== Television ===
Year	Title	Role	Notes
1980	Skag		Pilot
1981	Splendor in the Grass	Bud Stamper	TV Movie
1981	Darkroom	Ronnie Shires	Episode: "Catnip"
1982	M*A*S*H	Nick Gillis	Episode: "A Holy Mess"
1983	Inspector Perez	Danny McMahon	TV Movie
1983	An Uncommon Love	Willie	TV Movie
1983	Cutter to Houston	Frank Bickum	2 episodes
1986	On Wings of Eagles	Pat Scully	Miniseries; 2 episodes
1987	St. Elsewhere	Willie McClintock	Episode: "Schwarzald"
1987	Carly's Web	Frankie Bell	TV Movie
1987	Werewolf	Bobby	Episode: "The Boy Who Cried Werewolf"
1987	Houston Knights		Episode: "Diminished Capacity"
1988	Baja Oklahoma	Weldon Taylor	TV Movie
1988–1994	Murder, She Wrote	John Dowd/Patrick Griffith/Leo Stone	Episode: "Snow White, Blood Red", "A Killing in Cork" & "An Egg to Die For"
1990	Hardball		Episode: "A Death in the Family"
1990	Hunter	Michael Saccio	Episode: "Deadly Encounters: Parts 1 & 2"
1991	Matlock	Russ Gifford	Episode: "The Witness Killings: Parts 1 & 2"
1992	2000 Malibu Road	Chet	3 episodes
1993	Beverly Hills, 90210	Frank Padilla	Episode: "The Game Is Chicken"
1993	A Place to Be Loved	Ralph Kingsley	TV Movie
1994	The Commish	Terry Ross	2 episodes
1995	The Marshal	Lucas Burke	Episode: "The Ballad of Lucas Burke"
1995	Amazing Grace	Bob	Episode: "Family Values"
1995	Marker	Don Braddock	Episode: "Truth, Lies and Rock 'n' Roll"
1996	Renegade	Ned Cochran	Episode: "Paradise Lost"
1996	Walker, Texas Ranger	Frank Bodine	Episode: "The Brotherhood"
1997	Viper	Luke Riker	Episode: "Cold Storage"
1997–1998	Night Man	E. Harold Bridges/E. Haskell Bridges	Episode: "Face to Face" & "Bad to the Bone"
1997	Mike Hammer, Private Eye	Cory Itser	Episode: "Halloween"
1998	Star Trek: Deep Space Nine	Nahsk	Episode: "Who Mourns for Morn?"
1998	Touched by an Angel	Dutch Wilson	Episode: "Breaking Bread"
1998	Silk Stalkings	Viggo	Episode: "Forever"
1999	Profiler	Clint Darrow	Episode: "Burnt Offerings"
2002	ER	Mike Kinney	Episode: "A River in Egypt"
2002	The X-Files	Ed Kelso	Episode: "Hellbound"
2002	Windfall	Wylie	TV Movie
2003	Murder, She Wrote: The Celtic Riddle	Paddy Whelan	TV Movie
2003	Creating America's Next Hit Television Show	Walter Montgomery #1	
2005	Without a Trace	Kansas Dowel	Episode: "Penitence"
2006	Desire	Asher	4 episodes
2007	Sacrifices of the Heart	Ryan Weston	TV Movie
2007	American Heiress	Hit Man	2 episodes

== Theatre ==
Year	Title	Role	Director	Location	Ref.
2001	The Dead Boy	Tony McGuire	Jack Heller	Laurelgrove Theatre, Studio City, California	
