= B Street Theatre =

Theatre in Sacramento, California

Coordinates: 38.582962°N 121.466163°W

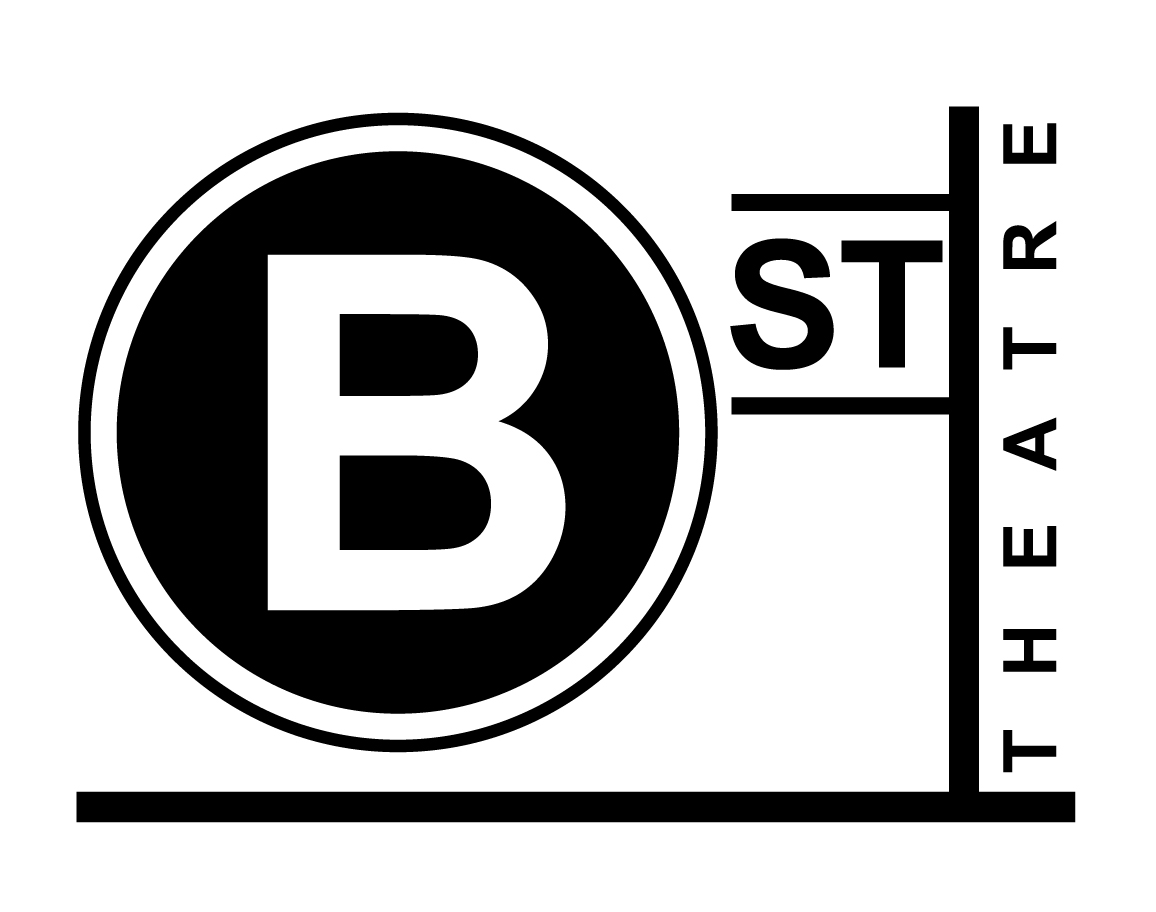
- Founded: 1986
- Headquarters: Sacramento
- Website: bstreettheatre.org

B Street Theatre is a 501c3 non-profit theater located in Sacramento, California. It was founded by actor Timothy Busfield and his brother Buck Busfield (who ran the company for decades) in 1986 as Theatre for Children, Inc., the company's first focus was a touring theatre company for children. The B Street Theatre School Tour (formerly known as Fantasy Theatre) was and continues to be extremely popular in the community— performing 12 times per week, 38 weeks a year. The School Tour has received critical acclaim by the media and educators. It is estimated that 3.6 million California children (currently about 200,000 per year) have attended performances since B Street Theatre's inception. For many children, The B Street Theatre School Tour is their only exposure to the live theatre in Northern California.

In 1991, in an effort to broaden the success of B Street Theatre School Tour, Timothy Busfield and his brother Buck Busfield created B Street Theatre. Most of the plays produced each year are world, national, West Coast or regional premieres. B Street Theatre has been named Best Live Theatre (14 consecutive years) by The Sacramento News & Review and Best Performing Arts Organization 13 times by Sacramento Magazine; B Street Theatre performs to approximately 70,000 adults annually.

In 2002, the company embarked on a third endeavor to allow families to experience live, professional theatre together. The B Street Theatre Family Series produces a four-show season of professional theatre presenting plays for school field trips during the week and the general public on weekends. Curriculum materials are developed for each Family Series production, and teachers are encouraged to develop classroom lessons based on themes from each play.

In addition to a professional touring theatre, B Street School Tour holds an annual playwriting festival and contest. The festival was created to provide a forum for the dramatic voice of youth and to conduct playwriting workshops that assist children in developing literary skills, problem- solving techniques, and a mode of artistic expression. This process stimulates the intellect and enhances self-esteem by providing validation of creative ideas and work support

== Programs ==
B Street Theatre School Tour For more than 20 years the mission of the B Street School Tour has been to provide entertainment to children while encouraging in them a love for the theatre and a specific appreciation for the art of playwriting. In addition to a professional touring theatre, B Street School Tour offers playwriting workshops and a playwriting contest for children in public and private schools, hospitals, and other locations throughout Northern California. An average of 450 children attend each performance, (with 12 performances a week, 37 weeks a year more than 200,000 children experience live theatre each year). A concerted outreach effort is made to ensure that the rich experience of theatre is provided to underserved communities. Children experience a variety of theatrical styles as well as a wide range of thematic ideas, from social commentary and family drama to satire and farce.

The playwriting contest was created to provide a forum for the dramatic voice of youth and playwriting workshops assist children in developing literary skills, problem-solving techniques, and increased artistic expression. This process stimulates the intellect and enhances self-esteem by providing validation of creative ideas and work efforts.

B Street Theatre Mainstage The B Street Theatre has been recognized as one of northern California's top professional theatres. Seven new plays are presented each season to approximately 75,000 people. Comedies, Dramas and new emerging plays are produced.

B Street Theatre Family Series The Family Series primarily serves children and their families through performances in the company's “B2” 112-seat theater space. The Family Series is California's only full-time, professional resident theater for children. Eight of The Family Series’ 12 weekly performances are designated for school field trips. The remaining four weekly performances are for the public. Four new plays are presented each season to approximately 25,000 school children and families.

Upstairs at the B B Street Theatre's space for artists-in-residence at The Sofia. Upstairs at The B is an all-purpose, all-inclusive space where artists curate and create events and workshops with production guidance of the B Street Theatre.

B3 Series The B3 Series ended in 2017 and is now merged with the Mainstage Series. B Street Theatre's more serious and dramatic series. The B3 Series focused on new contemporary plays for the sophisticated theatregoer. The B3 Series opened with a Pulitzer Prize winning drama on September 25, 2007 and presents four to five new plays each season.

B Street Conservatory and Studio for Young Actors The B Street Conservatory provides classes in technique and scene study to adult actors discovering their unique talents. The Studio for Young Actors is a year-round theatre education program to foster creativity, confidence and team building for young people ages 7 to 17. Instructors are B Street company members who themselves have received rigorous training and have extensive regional and national acting credits.

Intern Company The B Street Theatre Acting Internship is an intensive 10-month program that immerses young actors in every aspect of professional theatre. Interns are recent college graduates seeking their first post-college, professional theatre experience. The Intern Company experience provides four to eight talented young people with their first real “break” in the world of professional performing arts. In exchange for training and professional performing experience, interns provide the company with much needed assistance in the areas of administration as well as back and front of house operations.

== New Theatre ==
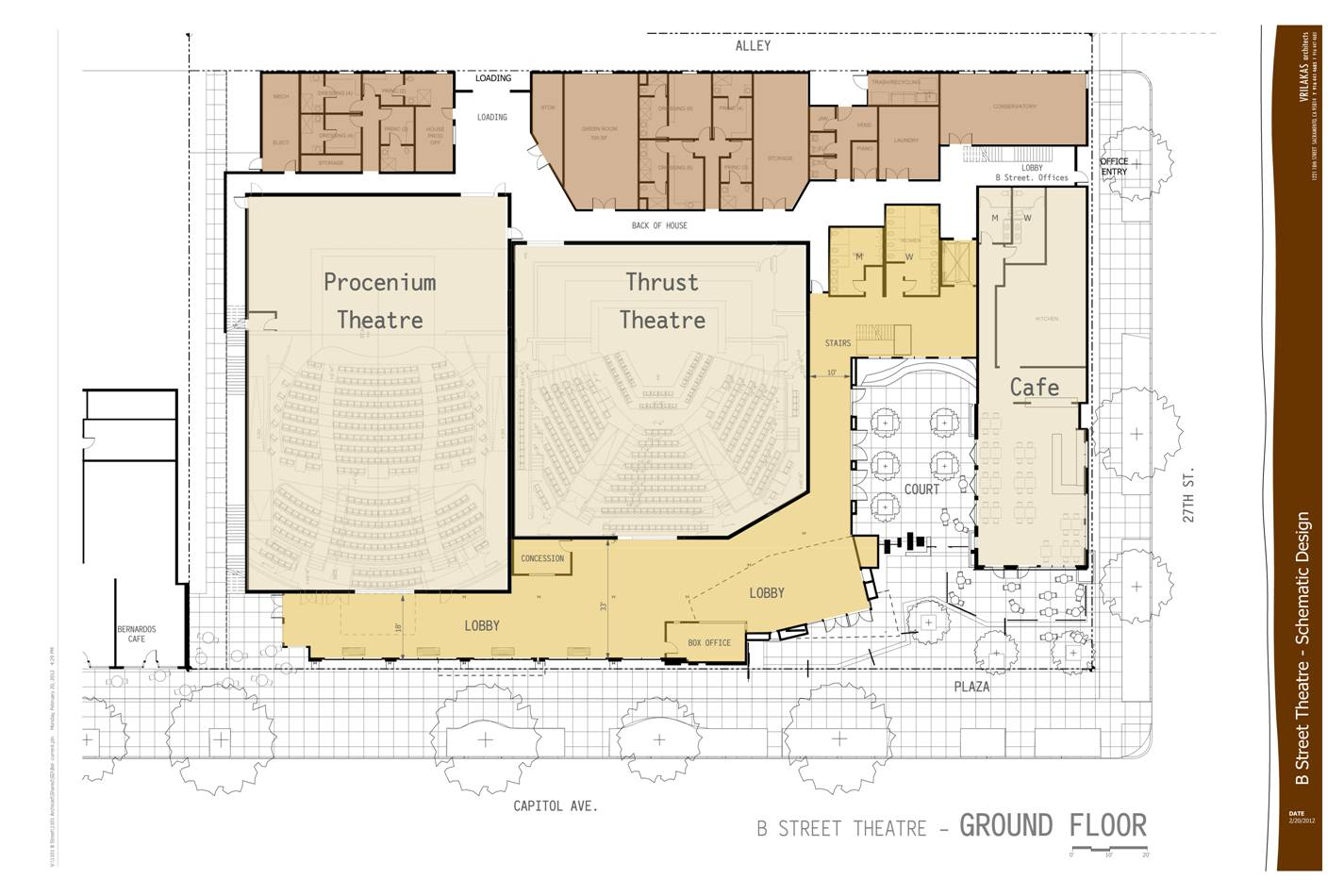
Ground Floor B Street

After getting a land grant from Sutter Medical Center, B Street Theatre started a Capital Campaign to build a new theater. The new theater is located at 27th and Capitol Avenue. The new Mainstage Theatre (Thrust Style) seats 250 patrons, and the Sutter Children's Theatre (Proscenium Style) seats 365 - three times the past theatre's size, allowing the theater to bring art education to an additional 30,000 children the theatre presently cannot accommodate. The local economic impact is estimated to be at $40 million locally over first 5 years. Local architect, Ron Vrilakas, designed a "come as you are" theatre experience that resonates with the past theatre. Sutter Children's Hospital is across the street in order to deepen the relationship between B Street and Sutter and further explore the restorative powers of theatre art for patients and their families.

The new performing arts complex in midtown Sacramento, named in honor of one of its key supporters – The Sofia Tsakopoulos Center for the Arts, affectionately known as The Sofia - opened in February 2018. The Sofia is home to B Street Theatre's Mike & Bobbie Voris Mainstage and the Sutter Theatre for Children – California's first year-round, professional theatre for children. In the same spirit of community from which B Street Theatre was born, Sutter Theatre has opened its doors to host the performances and events of local artists, community organizations, and visiting acts. In effect, this landmark facility will become an entertainment hub for all of Sacramento, where locals and tourists alike can see theatre, comedy, dance, or musical acts in an intimate, professional space every night of the year. In addition, its large public lobby, classrooms, open-air courtyard, and on-site restaurant make The Sofia a true destination.

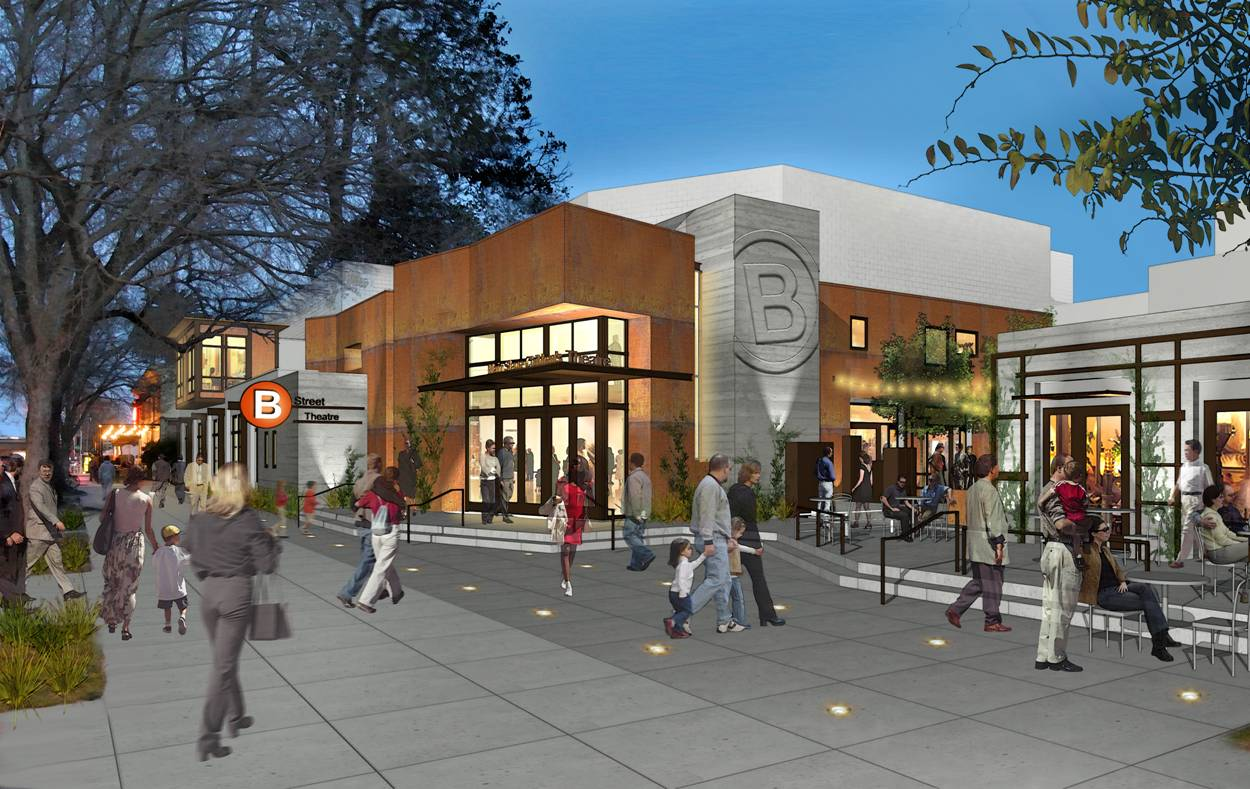
New Theatre Rendering
