= Splendor in the Grass (1981 film) =

- Genre: Drama
- Based on: Splendor in the Grass by William Inge
- Written by: John Herzfeld
- Directed by: Richard C. Sarafian
- Starring: Melissa Gilbert; Cyril O'Reilly; Ned Beatty
- Music by: John Morris
- Country of origin: United States
- Original language: English

Production
- Executive producer: Raymond Katz
- Producer: Arthur Lewis
- Cinematography: Ted Voigtlander
- Editor: Robert Florio
- Running time: 96 minutes
- Production companies: Warner Bros. Television; Katz-Gallin Productions; Half-Pint Productions

Original release
- Network: NBC
- Release: October 26, 1981

Splendor in the Grass is a 1981 American TV movie directed by Richard C. Sarafian. The movie is a remake of the 1961 film of the same name, written by William Inge and starring Natalie Wood and Warren Beatty.

== Plot ==
The film begins in 1927-1928 in the pre-Depression era in Kansas when oil is making many landowners wealthy. Deanie Loomis and Bud Stamper are a high school couple. Deanie is a sweet, idealistic girl who idolizes Bud and dreams of marrying him. Her family owns a general store and maintains a middle-class lifestyle, with a few investments in oil. Bud is an athletic, handsome but not academically talented senior whose family is very wealthy from oil investments and pumping on their ranch. Deanie's mother hovers over her and gives her guidance on being "good" in the eyes of society.

Bud loves Deanie but is having trouble managing his sexual urges around her. Deanie wants to please him but she holds the line at doing more than kissing. A messy encounter on New Year's Eve 1928 changes the trajectory of their relationship and puts Deanie in a state of deep mental funk. Bud, who has his hands full trying to corral his older, reckless sister, and assert himself in front of his domineering father, is on a mental decline of his own. His father is pressuring him to go to Yale and get a degree before returning to marry Deanie. Between Deanie's constant sexual rebuffs and his father's insistence about going to Yale, Bud puts his dreams aside and tells a friend that Deanie is available to date other boys. Bud has the sexual encounter he's been wanting with another girl from school, Juanita. Deeply hurt, Deanie rallies from her depression and attends a school dance with another boy. What happens at the dance results in Deanie's hospitalization and subsequent commitment to a mental institution for treatment. Bud, saddened by Deanie's condition, reluctantly goes to Yale.

At Yale, Bud flunks every class. He meets a waitress, Angelina, at an Italian restaurant and they develop a friendship. His father comes to town to try and talk the dean into letting Bud stay at Yale. Bud and his father stay at a hotel and mostly enjoy an evening at dinner, but his father hasn't changed since Bud left Kansas - he tries to set up Bud with a chorus girl. News then comes that the market is falling, but he refuses to sell his stocks. After learning he is financially ruined, he jumps out the hotel window. Finally rid of the overbearing influence of his father, Bud goes home.

At the institution, Deanie spends more than two years ironing out her issues with her parents and life. Her parents come to visit hoping to take her home soon, but she confirms for them that she needs to stay for more treatment. While there, she meets another man in treatment, a physician, who eventually asks her to marry him. However, Deanie wants to see Bud again.

When she is well enough to go home two and a half years later, she and her friends drive to Bud's ranch against her mother's wishes. Soon it is apparent that Bud has brought the Italian Angelina with him to Kansas, and they have started a family, but they live a lifestyle that is much poorer than that of Bud's childhood. Deanie meets his family and seems to accept that their paths have diverged quite a bit since high school. She tells him she's going to marry the man she met at the institution. Bud seems content doing what he always wanted to do.

The film is a coming of age story and parallels the lines in Wordsworth's poem "Ode: Intimations of Immortality from Recollections of Early Childhood".

== Cast ==
- Melissa Gilbert as Wilma Dean 'Deanie' Loomis
- Cyril O'Reilly as Bud Stamper
- Ned Beatty as Ace Stamper
- Eva Marie Saint as Mrs. Loomis
- Michelle Pfeiffer as Ginny Stamper
- Todd Elliot as Bill Brown
- Gail Rice as Terry Smith
- Macon McCalman as Del Loomis
- Richard McKenzie as Doc Smiley
- Jim Youngs as Alan 'Toots' Tuttle
- Nicholas Pryor as Dr. Judd
- Toni Kalem as Angelina
- Graham Jarvis as Dean Pollard
- Doran Clark as Juanita Howard
- K Callan as Miss Metcalf
- Ally Sheedy as Hazel
- David James Carroll as Johnnie Masterson
- Peter Jason as Coash
- Gigi Vorgan as June
- Lenora May as Kay
- Richard Young as Brian Stacey
- Gary Dubin as Rusty
- David Underwood as Jack
- Merritt Butrick as Glenn

== Background ==
Melissa Gilbert was set to star in the remake of Miracle on 34th Street, which also starred Natalie Wood. In 1981, she landed in the role of Deanie Loomis, a remake of a 1961 film, starring Wood. It was one of her first 'meaty roles'. Gilbert, only a 17-year-old by the time, started dating co-star Cyril O'Reilly while filming. She eventually lost her virginity to him on the last day of filming.

The movie was received with mixed reviews, and it was much criticized for remaking the film scene for scene. The New York Times criticized the plot for having no conclusions. The critic praised the performances of both Gilbert and O'Reilly and called the direction of Richard C. Sarafian 'sensitively unobtrusive'. The movie also featured a young Michelle Pfeiffer in one of her earliest roles. Gilbert was nominated for a Young Artist Award in the category Best Young Actress in a Television Special.
