= The Diary of Anne Frank (1980 film) =

1980 American biographical-drama film

- 1980 film poster
- Genre: Biography; Drama
- Based on: The Diary of a Young Girl by Anne Frank; The Diary of Anne Frank by Albert Hackett
- Written by: Frances Goodrich; Albert Hackett
- Directed by: Boris Sagal
- Starring: Melissa Gilbert; Maximilian Schell; Joan Plowright; James Coco; Doris Roberts
- Music by: Billy Goldenberg
- Country of origin: United States
- Original language: English

Production
- Executive producer: Raymond Katz
- Producer: Arthur Lewis
- Cinematography: Ted Voigtlander
- Editors: Garth Craven; Ronald Smith
- Running time: 109 minutes
- Production company: 20th Century Fox Television

Original release
- Network: NBC
- Release: November 17, 1980

The Diary of Anne Frank is a 1980 American made-for-television biographical drama film which originally aired on NBC on November 17, 1980. Like the 1959 film of the same title, it was written by Frances Goodrich and Albert Hackett and directed by Boris Sagal. Unlike the 1959 film, the TV-film focuses more on character development than suspense, and is considerably shorter than the 1959 version. In this version, Melissa Gilbert plays Anne Frank.

The film received mixed reviews since its premiere.

== Cast ==
- Maximilian Schell as Otto Frank
- Joan Plowright as Edith Frank
- James Coco as Hans Van Daan
- Doris Roberts as Petronella Van Daan
- Clive Revill as Dr. Dussel
- Scott Jacoby as Peter Van Daan
- Melissa Gilbert as Anne Frank
- Melora Marshall as Margot Frank
- Erik Holland as Mr. Kraler
- Anne Wyndham as Miep Gies

== Awards ==
The film was nominated for one Golden Globe award in 1981, for Best Mini-Series or Motion Picture Made for TV. It was nominated for three Emmy awards, also in 1981, for Outstanding Achievement in Makeup (Scott H. Eddo and Stanley Smith), Outstanding Cinematography for a Limited Series or a Special (Ted Voigtlander) and Outstanding Individual Achievement - Special Class (Rita Bennett, women's costumer, and Bill Blackburn, men's costumer).
