= Sacrifices of the Heart =

2007 American television film

- Written by: Patti Davis
- Directed by: David S. Cass Sr.
- Starring: Melissa Gilbert; Ken Howard
- Theme music composer: Joe Kraemer
- Country of origin: United States
- Original language: English

Production
- Producers: Amy Goldberg; Robert Halmi, Jr.
- Cinematography: Maximo Munzi (director of photography)
- Editor: Colleen Halsey
- Running time: 90 minutes
- Production company: Larry Levinson Productions

Original release
- Network: Hallmark Channel
- Release: January 10, 2007

Sacrifices of the Heart (working title Spring Thaw) is a 2007 American made-for-television drama film starring Melissa Gilbert and Ken Howard that aired on Hallmark Channel in 2007. The film is made from a script by Patti Davis, daughter of Ronald Reagan.

== Plot summary ==
Katelyn 'Kate' Weston (Melissa Gilbert) is a lawyer who is estranged from her family. Her older brother Ryan (Cyril O'Reilly) asks her to return to the farm he runs with their dad Thane (Ken Howard), who has become increasingly absentminded. By the time he is formally diagnosed with serious Alzheimer's disease, Kate realizes how much she doesn't know her family, having run from her past after the trauma of witnessing her mother's suicide at age seven. She decides to spend the remainder or her father's lucid moments reconciling with him and learning the things she never knew about her own family.

== Cast ==
- Melissa Gilbert as Kate Weston/Anne Weston
- Ken Howard as Thane Weston
- Cyril O'Reilly as Ryan Weston

== Reception ==
The premiere of Sacrifices of the Heart earned the top spot as ad-supported cable's highest-rated movie of the day on Saturday, March 3, 9-11 p.m., ET/PT. The movie delivered a 2.3 household rating with 1.8 million households and nearly 3.2 million unduplicated viewers (P2+). The film won the time period among household and ranked in the top 10 in key adult and women demo ratings. The movie also ranked as the fourth highest-rated movie of the week on ad-supported cable. This performance is especially notable since the original movie outperformed blockbuster feature films on other top 10 cable networks.

=== "Family Approved" Seal ===
On April 4, 2007, the film was awarded The Dove Foundation's "Family Approved" Seal. The award is given to movies, DVDs, made-for-TV films and other entertainment programs which portray and encourage positive values. The Dove Foundation lauded the film as handling serious issues in a respectable manner, and that "it's a movie that gets to the heart of family relationships and what families are all about."
