= Killer Instinct (1988 film) =

- Written by: Conrad Bromberg
- Directed by: Waris Hussein
- Starring: Melissa Gilbert; Woody Harrelson
- Music by: Paul Chihara
- Country of origin: United States
- Original language: English

Production
- Producers: Conrad Bromberg; Stuart Millar
- Cinematography: Robert Steadman
- Editor: Andrew Chulack
- Running time: 93 minutes
- Production company: ITC Entertainment

Original release
- Network: NBC
- Release: November 22, 1988

Killer Instinct (also known as Deadly Observation) is a 1988 American made-for-television drama film starring Melissa Gilbert and Woody Harrelson, directed by Waris Hussein.

== Plot ==
Charlie Long is a young attorney assigned to the case of Fred Zamora, a violent and uncontrollable man, about to be released from the hospital. Charlie doesn't think it is a good idea for a man with mental problems to be released and tries to prove that, with the help of Dr. Lisa DaVito. Lisa's career is in jeopardy when Fred is eventually released and immediately committed a murder.

== Cast ==
- Melissa Gilbert as Dr. Lisa DaVito
- Woody Harrelson as Charlie Long
- Fernando Lopez as Fred Zamora
- Lane Smith as Dr. Butler
- Kevin Conroy as Dr. Steven Nelson
