= Teri Hatcher =

American actress (born 1964)

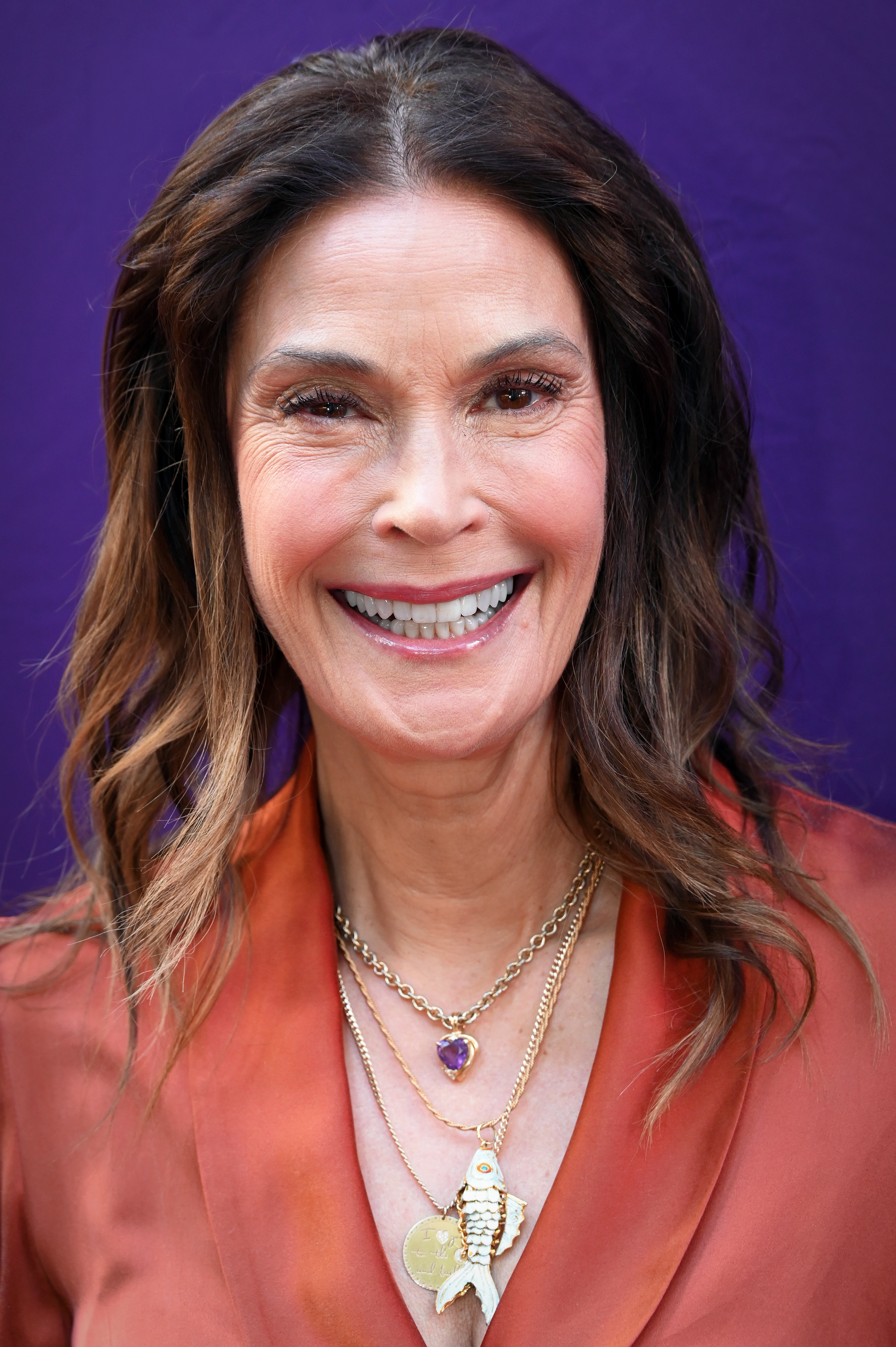
- Hatcher in 2026
- Born: December 8, 1964 (age 61); Palo Alto, California, U.S.
- Education: American Conservatory Theater; De Anza College
- Occupations: Actress; singer; author; NFL cheerleader; director
- Years active: 1985–present
- Known for: Lois & Clark: The New Adventures of Superman; Tomorrow Never Dies; Desperate Housewives; The Love Boat
- Spouses: Marcus Leithold (m. 1988; div. 1989) Jon Tenney (m. 1994; div. 2003)
- Children: 1

Teri Lynn Hatcher (born December 8, 1964) is an American actress best known for her portrayal of Lois Lane on the television series Lois & Clark: The New Adventures of Superman (1993–1997). She also played Paris Carver in the James Bond film Tomorrow Never Dies (1997), Mel Jones and the Beldam in Coraline (2009) and Susan Mayer on the television series Desperate Housewives (2004–2012), for which she won a Golden Globe Award for Best Actress in a Musical or Comedy and three Screen Actors Guild Awards (one as lead female actor, two as part of Best Ensemble), and was nominated for a Primetime Emmy Award for Outstanding Lead Actress in a Comedy Series.

== Early life ==
Hatcher was born on December 8, 1964, in Palo Alto, California, the only child of Esther Beshur, a computer programmer who worked for Lockheed Martin, and Owen Walker Hatcher Jr., a nuclear physicist and electrical engineer. Her father is of English, some Irish and Scottish ancestry, while her mother is of one half Syrian and one half Frisian ancestry.

Hatcher took ballet lessons at the San Juan School of Dance in Los Altos and grew up in Sunnyvale, California. At De Anza College she studied mathematics and engineering.

In March 2006, she alleged that she was sexually abused from the age of five by Richard Hayes Stone, an uncle by marriage who was later divorced by Hatcher's aunt. She said her parents were unaware of the abuse. In 2002, she assisted Santa Clara County prosecutors with their indictment of Stone for a more recent sexual offense that led his female victim to die by suicide at 14. Stone pleaded guilty to four counts of child sexual abuse and was sentenced to 14 years in prison. Hatcher said she told the prosecutors about her own abuse because she was haunted by thoughts of the 14-year-old girl who shot herself, and feared Stone might escape conviction. Stone died of colon cancer on August 19, 2008, after serving six years of his sentence.

== Career ==
=== 1984–1992: Early work ===
Hatcher studied acting at the American Conservatory Theater. One of her early jobs (in 1984) was as an NFL cheerleader with the San Francisco 49ers. From September 1985 to May 1986, she joined the cast of the TV series The Love Boat as Amy, one of the Mermaid showgirls. It mainly involved dancing and singing as part of the Mermaids show routine, but she had short comedic lines in some episodes, and in one episode was part of one of three storylines opposite a male guest star. From 1986 to 1989, she appeared in six episodes of the TV series MacGyver as talkative but naive Penny Parker opposite Richard Dean Anderson's eponymous hero.

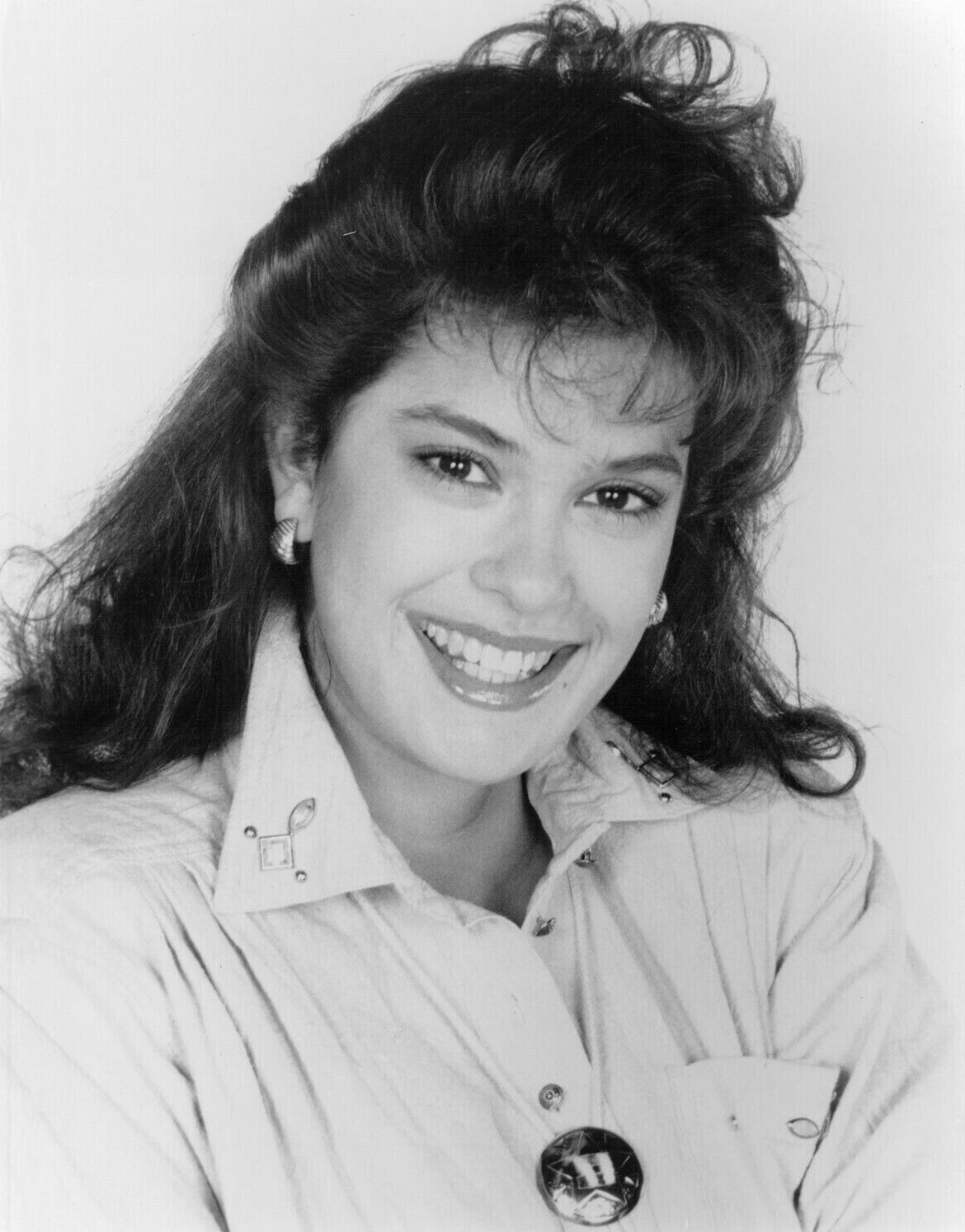
Hatcher as Laura Matthews in Karen's Song, 1987

In 1987, she played the sensible, intelligent 18-year-old daughter of Patty Duke's lead character in the short-lived Fox comedy Karen's Song, and had a guest-star role in an episode of Night Court. In 1988, she made a short guest appearance in the Star Trek: The Next Generation episode "The Outrageous Okona" as Lt. Robinson. In 1989, she guest-starred in an episode of Quantum Leap, "Star Crossed," as the main character's mathematician/scientist future wife; and guest-starred as a nude beauty pageant winner in an episode of L.A. Law. That year she also made her motion picture debut with a minor role as a young opportunistic actress in The Big Picture, starring Kevin Bacon. She then played Sylvester Stallone's younger sister, a dancer, in the big-budget police action-comedy Tango & Cash, also starring Kurt Russell; it was a critical and box office disappointment.

After a short guest appearance in an episode of Murphy Brown in 1990, Hatcher's next TV series role, in 1991, was in the Norman Lear creation Sunday Dinner, a comedy. She co-starred as 30-year-old lawyer in a mostly physical relationship with a widowed businessman twice her age, played by Robert Loggia. The series had a brief run on CBS that summer but was not renewed. She also acted in the television crime movie Dead in the Water (1991) in which she plays Bryan Brown's lawyer's young, attractive temptress secretary, and in the low-budget erotic thriller The Cool Surface (not released until 1994), wherein she plays a young actress who has an ill-fated romance with an enigmatic, unsettled screenwriter. In late 1991, Hatcher was featured as Michael Bolton's love interest in the music video for Bolton's hit song "Missing You Now". In 1992, Hatcher tried out for the role of Jamie Buchman on Mad About You and made it to the final two choices, but lost the part to Helen Hunt.

=== 1993–1997: Breakthrough ===
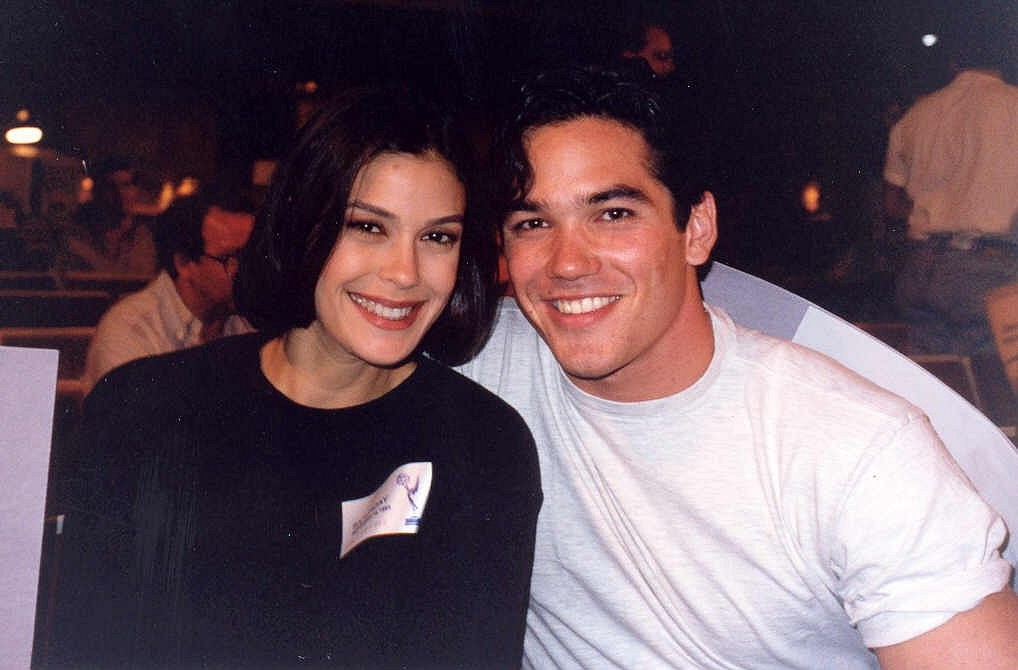
Hatcher with Dean Cain at the 45th Primetime Emmy Awards, 1993

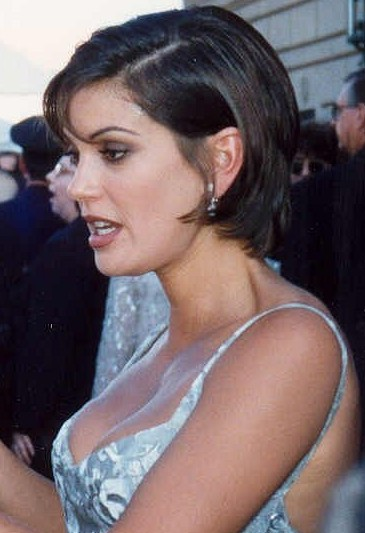
Hatcher at the 47th Primetime Emmy Awards, 1995

Hatcher made a much-discussed guest appearance on a 1993 episode of Seinfeld, in which her character, Sidra, breaks up with Jerry because she believes Jerry sent his friend Elaine into a sauna to find out if Sidra's breasts are natural or enhanced by surgery. The episode concludes with Sidra saying to Jerry, "By the way, they're real, and they're spectacular" as she leaves his apartment. Hatcher returned to play Sidra in brief scenes in two subsequent episodes: "The Pilot", the fourth season finale, and "The Finale (Part 2)", the series finale.

Hatcher landed a starring role in the ABC television series Lois & Clark: The New Adventures of Superman as the Daily Planet reporter Lois Lane (opposite Dean Cain as Superman/Clark Kent) from 1993 to 1997. At the height of the show's popularity in 1995, a picture of Hatcher wearing nothing but Superman's iconic red cape was reportedly the most downloaded image on the Internet for several months. "It's a great shot," she said. "Not so much because it's me. It's just cool looking." Hatcher also co-wrote an episode for season three called "It's A Small World After All" about a former classmate who shrinks and kidnaps her classmate's spouses and traps them in a dollhouse.

Hatcher hosted NBC's Saturday Night Live in 1996. Hatcher won the role of Paris Carver (beating Monica Bellucci) in the 1997 James Bond film Tomorrow Never Dies. Hatcher was three months pregnant at the filming's start. A publicist said the pregnancy did not affect the production schedule. She was voted the world's sexiest woman by readers of popular men's magazine FHM in spring 1997 after having been number four in 1996 and was number 15 in 1998; she also made the list's top 100 in 1999 and 2000. Celebrity Sleuth ranked her as its Sexiest Woman for 1997, the only year it ranked her in its Top 25 list. The Australian version of FHM began a 100 Sexiest Women list in 1998 and Hatcher placed 25th on the list, but she did not make the next list published in 2000.

Hatcher also appeared in films such as Spy Kids (2001), and played a villain in two crime dramas, the ensemble 2 Days in the Valley (1996), a moderate box office success, and Heaven's Prisoners (1996), co-starring Alec Baldwin, which failed at the box office.

Hatcher appeared in a series of RadioShack television commercials alongside National Football League player Howie Long.

=== 2004–2012: Commercial success with Desperate Housewives ===
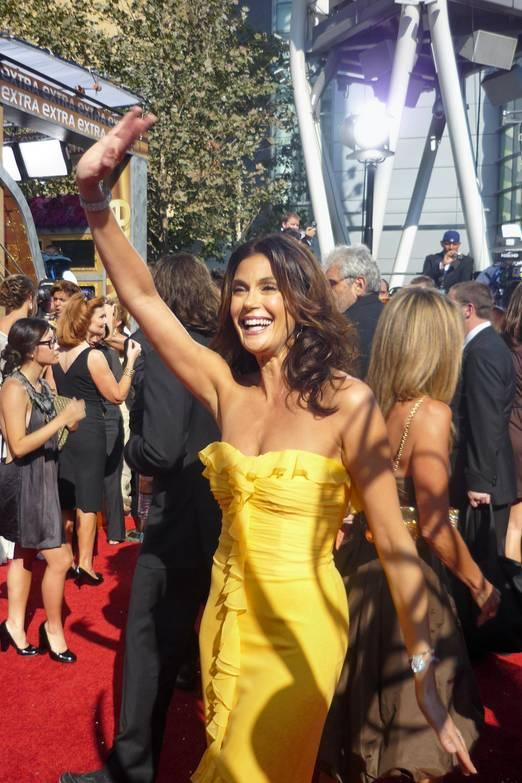
Hatcher at 60th Primetime Emmy Awards in 2008

She beat four other actresses for one of the lead roles on ABC's Desperate Housewives, in which she starred as Susan Mayer, a role for which she won the Best Actress in a Musical or Comedy Golden Globe Award in January 2005. Later that year, Hatcher won the Screen Actors Guild (SAG) award in the same category. In July 2005, she was nominated for an Emmy award as Outstanding Lead Actress in a Comedy Series, along with co-stars Marcia Cross and Felicity Huffman.

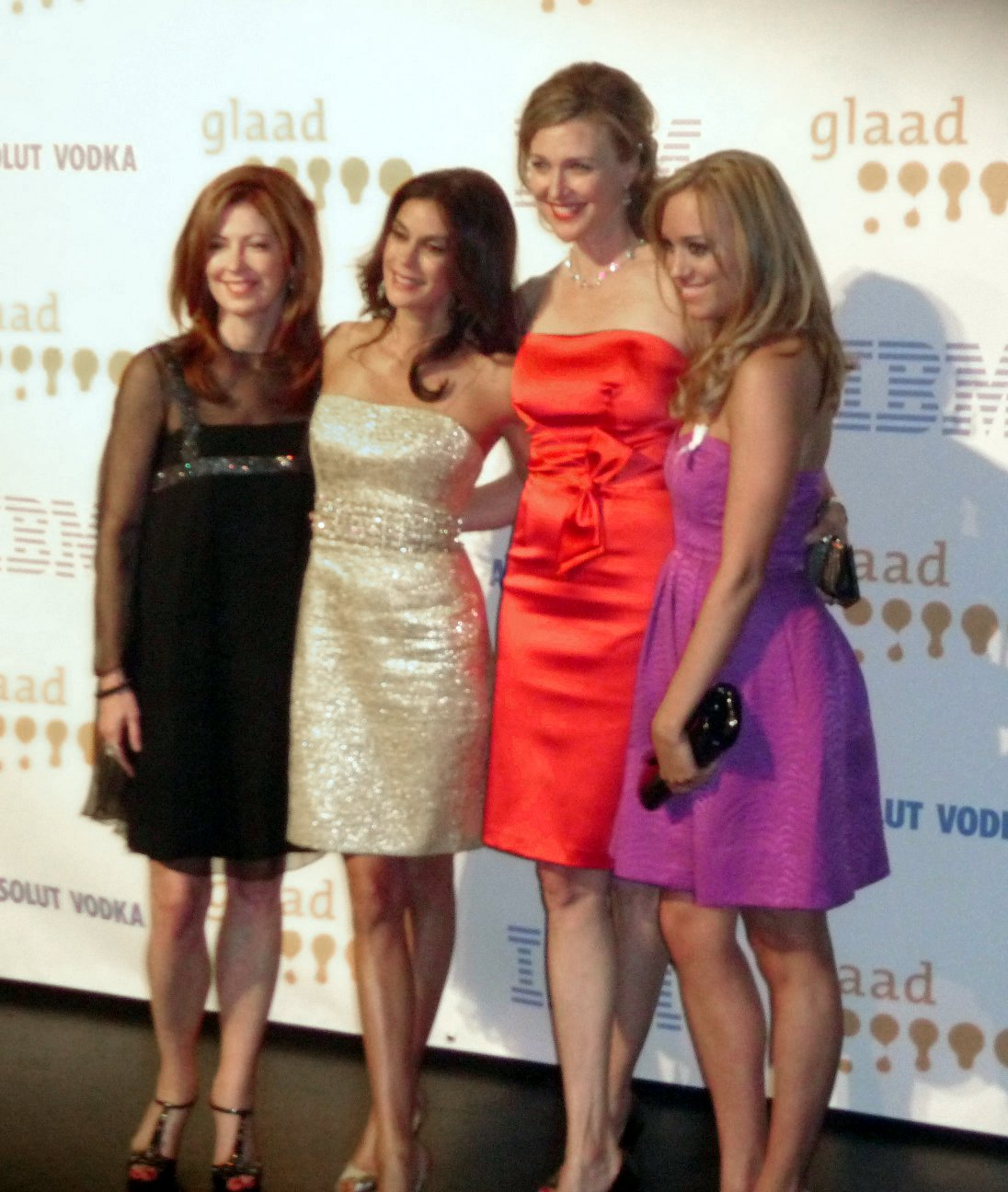
Dana Delany, Hatcher, Brenda Strong and Andrea Bowen of Desperate Housewives at the 2009 GLAAD Media Awards

Hatcher again made FHM's world's sexiest woman list in 2005 and 2006, placing at 63 and 81 those years, respectively. The US version of FHM ranked her in its US's 100 Sexiest Woman list five times between its inaugural edition in 2000 and 2007, with peaks of number 7 in 2005 and number 10 in 2006. and she was on the cover of the magazine's February 2005 edition. Hatcher also re-entered the FHM Australia's Top 100 Sexiest Women list in 2005 and 2006 ranking 19 and 50 those years. She made similar lists in the German and Portuguese versions of FHM those years. Maxim Magazine placed her in its Top 100 listing of Sexiest Women of 2006 (a listing they began in 1999) at number 73.

As of April 2006, Hatcher was one of the highest paid television actresses in the United States, reportedly being paid $285,000 per episode of Desperate Housewives. That year she was one of the three nominees for Favorite Television Performer for the People's Choice Awards and was again nominated for a Golden Globe as Lead Actress in a television comedy program. In May 2006, she released her first book, Burnt Toast: And Other Philosophies of Life. Hatcher performed The Beatles song "Good Night" on the 2006 charity album Unexpected Dreams – Songs From the Stars. On April 9, 2008, Hatcher appeared on Idol Gives Back, singing Carrie Underwood's "Before He Cheats". She voiced the Other Mother, a mysterious, button-eyed figure, as well as Coraline's mother Mel Jones, who constantly shows Coraline "tough love," both in the 2009 film Coraline, which received critical acclaim.

In 2010, Hatcher made a return to the Superman franchise, with a special guest role in the final season of Smallville as Ella Lane, the mother of Erica Durance's Lois Lane. The episode continued a tradition of former Lois Lane actresses portraying the character's mother many years later. Noel Neill appeared as Lois' mother in the 1978 film Superman: The Movie, and Phyllis Coates made a similar appearance on Lois & Clark.

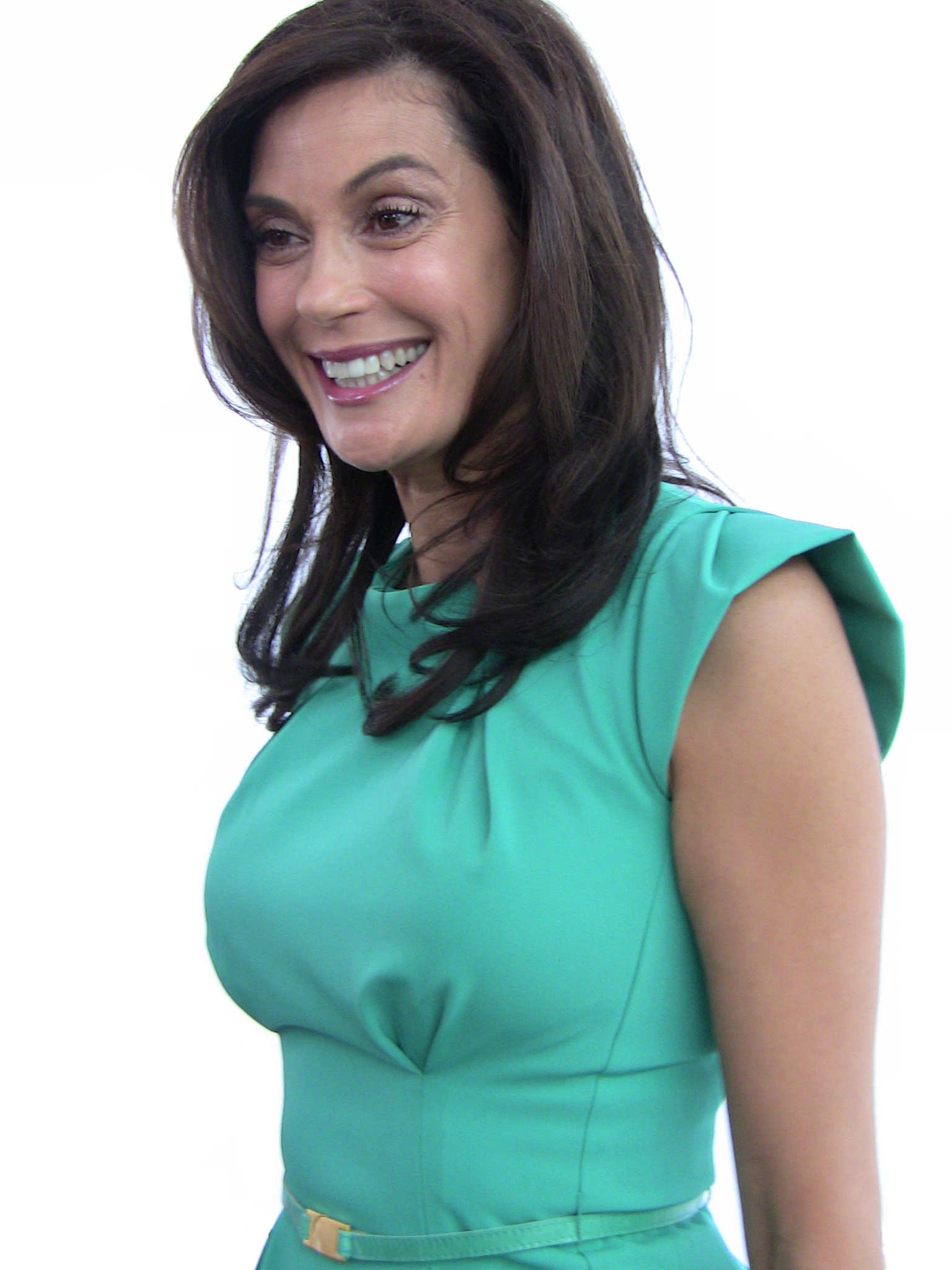
Hatcher at Desperate Housewives Paley Fest in 2009

A report in November 2010 suggested that Hatcher, along with co-star Felicity Huffman, would be quitting Desperate Housewives, but ABC denied the claim. Hatcher later addressed the rumors of her departure from Desperate Housewives, saying that "[t]here are not enough adjectives to describe how stupid, off base, and ridiculously untrue this is". However, after the show concluded in 2012, media sources revealed an apparent rift with her co-stars. It has been widely speculated that the cast did not get along well with Hatcher. Eva Longoria, Felicity Huffman, Marcia Cross, and Vanessa Williams gave thank-you gifts to the crew from the show which included a message with their names inscribed at the end, and Hatcher's name was distinctly absent. TV Guide source, William Keck, revealed that "something went down" between Hatcher and the cast that caused a rift, and also observed how Hatcher would physically distance herself from the others during breaks in filming. On her end, Hatcher said to TV Guide that "I will never disclose the true and complicated journey of us all, but I wish everyone on the show well."

In 2011, Men's Health magazine named Hatcher #38 on their "Hottest Women of All Time" list.

=== 2013–present: Post-Desperate Housewives work ===
Hatcher voiced Dottie in the films Planes (2013) and Planes: Fire & Rescue (2014). In 2016, Hatcher had a recurring role as Charlotte, a successful single mother who becomes Oscar's (Matthew Perry) love interest in the second season of the comedy series The Odd Couple. In 2017, Hatcher appeared as Queen Rhea of Daxam in a recurring role on The CW series Supergirl.

In 2018, Hatcher debuted a YouTube channel called Hatching Change. After 132 segments, it ceased updating in 2022. Hatcher, an enthusiastic baker who took cooking lessons, won the Food Network celebrity episode of Chopped. She also won the "Stand Up to Cancer" episode of The Great British Bake Off episode in 2018. Teri Hatcher narrated the "Hidden Worlds: The Films of LAIKA" exhibit at the Museum of Pop Culture in Seattle.

In 2024, Hatcher portrayed Ruth Finley in the Lifetime film The Killer Inside: The Ruth Finley Story.

In October 2026, Hatcher will take over the role of Miranda Priestly in the West End run of The Devil Wears Prada, from Vanessa Williams who originated the role in the UK.

== Personal life ==
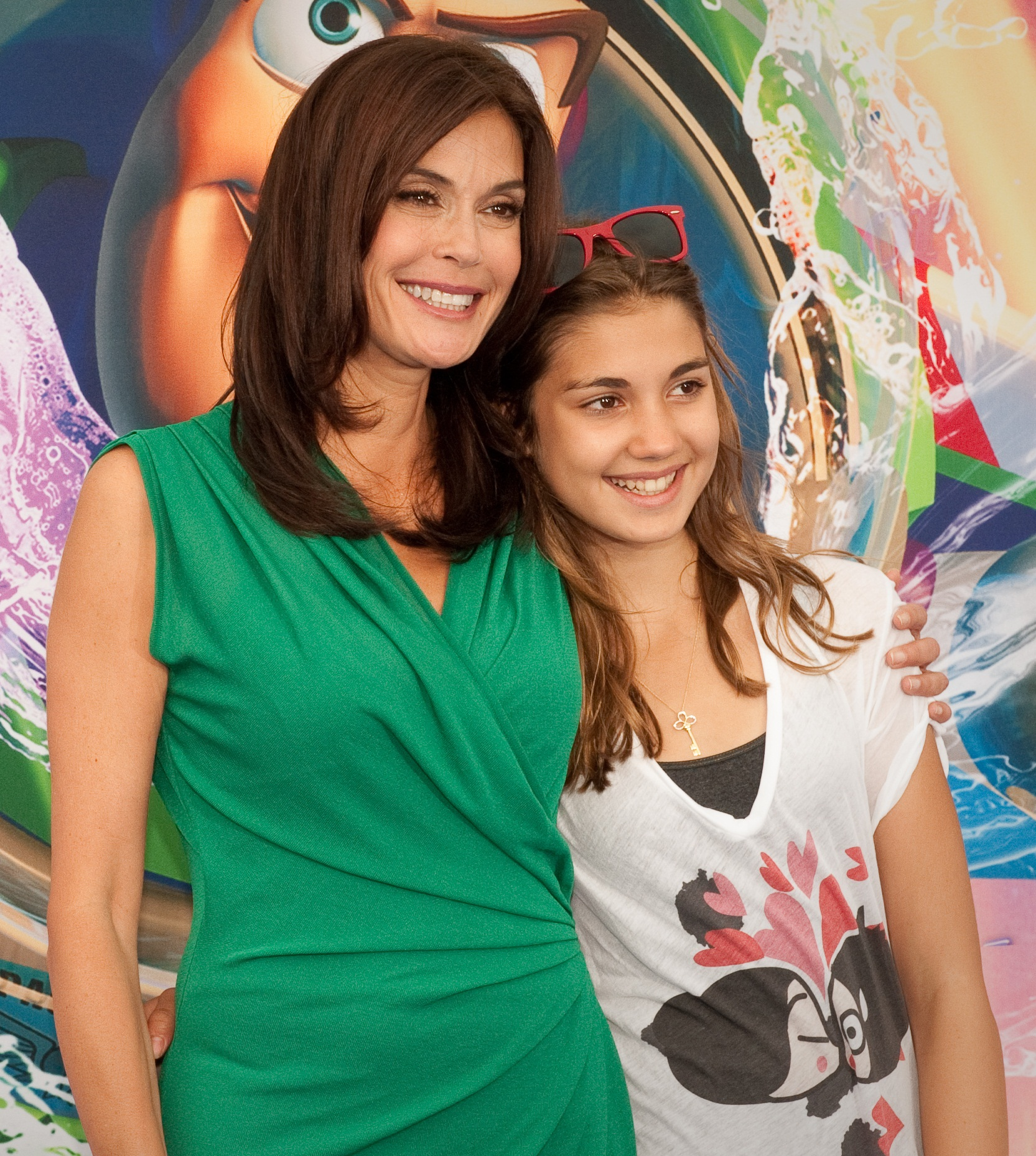
Hatcher, with daughter, at the World of Color premiere (2010)

Hatcher married Marcus Leithold, of Butler, Pennsylvania, on June 4, 1988; they divorced the following year. On May 27, 1994, she married actor Jon Tenney; they had a daughter born in 1997. They divorced in March 2003.

In 2007, Hatcher began writing a column for Glamour magazine.

== Filmography ==
=== Film ===
Year	Title	Role	Notes
1989	The Big Picture	Gretchen Gorman	
1989	Tango & Cash	Katherine "Kiki" Tango	
1991	Soapdish	Ariel Maloney	
1992	Straight Talk	Janice	
1993	Brainsmasher... A Love Story	Samantha Crain	
1994	The Cool Surface	Dani Payson	
1994	All Tied Up	Linda Alissio	
1996	Dead Girl	Passer-By	
1996	Heaven's Prisoners	Claudette Rocque	
1996	2 Days in the Valley	Becky Foxx	
1997	Tomorrow Never Dies	Paris Carver	
1999	Fever	Charlotte Parker	
2001	Spy Kids	Ms. Gradenko	
2007	Resurrecting the Champ	Andrea Flak	
2009	Coraline	Mel Jones, Coraline's Mother / The Other Mother (The Beldam)	Voice role
2013	Planes	Dottie	Voice role
2014	Planes: Fire & Rescue	Dottie	Voice role
2016	Sundown	Janice	
2019	Madness in the Method	Geena	
2023	How to Fall in Love by Christmas	Nora Winters	

=== Television ===
Year	Title	Role	Notes
1985–1986	The Love Boat	Amy, Love Boat Mermaid	19 episodes
1986–1990	MacGyver	Penny Parker	6 episodes
1986–1987	Capitol	Angelica Stimac Clegg	5 episodes
1987	Karen's Song	Laura Matthews	13 episodes
1987	Night Court	Kitty Daniels	Episode: "Who Was That Mashed Man?"
1988	CBS Summer Playhouse	Lauri Stevens	Episode: "Baby on Board"
1988	Star Trek: The Next Generation	Lieutenant Bronwyn Gail Robinson	Episode: "The Outrageous Okona"; Uncredited
1989	L.A. Law	Tracy Shoe	Episode: "I'm in the Nude for Love"
1989	Quantum Leap	Donna Eleese	Episode: "Star-Crossed"
1990	Murphy Brown	Madeline Stillwell	Episode: "Fax or Fiction"
1990	Tales from the Crypt	Stacy	Episode: "The Thing from the Grave"
1991	The Brotherhood	Teresa Gennaro	Television film
1991	Sunday Dinner	T.T. Fagori	6 episodes
1991	Dead in the Water	Laura Stewart	Television film
1991	The Exile	Marissa	Episode: "Eclipse"
1993–1997	Lois & Clark: The New Adventures of Superman	Lois Lane	Main role (87 episodes)
1993–1998	Seinfeld	Sidra Holland	3 episodes
1998	Since You've Been Gone	Maria Goldstein	Television film
1998	Frasier	Marie	Episode: "First Do No Harm"
2000	Running Mates	Shawna Morgan	Television film
2001	Say Uncle	Unknown	Television film
2001	Jane Doe	Jane Doe	Television film
2003	Momentum	Jordan Ripps	Television film
2004–2012	Desperate Housewives	Susan Mayer Delfino	Lead role (180 episodes)
2004	Two and a Half Men	Liz	Episode: "I Remember the Coatroom, I Just Don't Remember You"
2010	Smallville	Ella Lane	Episode: "Abandoned"
2012	Jane by Design	Kate Quimby	4 episodes
2013–2014	Jake and the Never Land Pirates	Beatrice LeBeak	Voice role (8 episodes)
2014	Stan Lee's Mighty 7	Silver Skylark	Voice role; television film
2016–2017	The Odd Couple	Charlotte	Recurring role (11 episodes)
2017	Supergirl	Rhea	Recurring role (8 episodes)
2018	QI	Herself	Panelist (1 episode)
2021	A Kiss Before Christmas	Joyce	Television film
2022	Mid-Love Crisis	Mindy Quinn	Television film
2023	Fantasy Island	Dolly	Episode: "Paymer vs. Paymer"
2023	How to Fall in Love by Christmas	Nora Winters	Television film
2023	Christmas at the Chalet	Lex Riley	Television film
2024–present	WondLa	Muthr	Main voice role (14 episodes)
2024	The Killer Inside: The Ruth Finley Story	Ruth Finley	Television film

=== Stage ===
Year	Title	Role	Notes
1999	Cabaret	Sally Bowles	National Tour
2022	The Addams Family	Morticia Addams	Kavli Theatre
2026	The Devil Wears Prada	Miranda Priestly	Dominion Theatre

== Awards and nominations ==
=== Honors ===
- 1996: Honored as the Female Discovery of the Year by the Golden Apple Awards.
- 2011: Nominated — Favorite Online Sensation by the People's Choice Awards.

=== Accolades ===
Association	Year	Category	Title	Result
The Great Celebrity Bake Off for SU2C	2018	Star Baker		Won
Gold Derby Awards	2005	Comedy Lead Actress	Desperate Housewives	Nominated
Gold Derby Awards	2005	Ensemble of the Year	Desperate Housewives	Nominated
Golden Globe Awards	2005	Best Actress in a Television Series – Comedy or Musical	Desperate Housewives	Won
Golden Globe Awards	2006	Best Actress in a Television Series – Comedy or Musical	Desperate Housewives	Nominated
Golden Raspberry Awards	1997	Worst Supporting Actress	Heaven's Prisoners 2 Days in the Valley	Nominated
Online Film & Television Association Awards	2005	Best Actress in a Comedy Series	Desperate Housewives	Nominated
People's Choice Awards	2006	Favorite Female Television Star	Desperate Housewives	Nominated
Primetime Emmy Awards	2005	Outstanding Lead Actress in a Comedy Series	Desperate Housewives	Nominated
Prism Awards	2008	Performance in a Comedy Series	Desperate Housewives	Nominated
Satellite Awards	2005	Best Actress in a Series – Comedy or Musical	Desperate Housewives	Nominated
Saturn Awards	1998	Best Supporting Actress	Tomorrow Never Dies	Nominated
Screen Actors Guild Awards	2005	Outstanding Performance by a Female Actor in a Comedy Series	Desperate Housewives	Won
Screen Actors Guild Awards	2005	Outstanding Performance by an Ensemble in a Comedy Series	Desperate Housewives	Won
Screen Actors Guild Awards	2006	Outstanding Performance by an Ensemble in a Comedy Series	Desperate Housewives	Won
Screen Actors Guild Awards	2007	Outstanding Performance by an Ensemble in a Comedy Series	Desperate Housewives	Nominated
Screen Actors Guild Awards	2008	Outstanding Performance by an Ensemble in a Comedy Series	Desperate Housewives	Nominated
Screen Actors Guild Awards	2009	Outstanding Performance by an Ensemble in a Comedy Series	Desperate Housewives	Nominated
Teen Choice Awards	2006	Choice TV Actress – Comedy	Desperate Housewives	Nominated
Teen Choice Awards	2017	Choice TV – Villain	Supergirl	Nominated
Television Critics Association Awards	2005	Individual Achievement in Comedy	Desperate Housewives	Nominated
Viewers for Quality Television Awards	1994	Best Actress in a Quality Drama Series	Lois & Clark: The New Adventures of Superman	Nominated
