= Anne Wyndham =

American television actress

- Born: January 29, 1951 (age 75); California, U.S.
- Occupation: Television actress
- Years active: 1972–2007

Anne Wyndham (born January 29, 1951) is an American television actress. She is known for playing the title character's daughter Rachel in the television series Barney Miller.

== Career ==
Born in California, Wyndham began her career in 1972, appearing in the soap opera television series General Hospital. She played the role of Caroline Murray until 1975. Wyndham then made guest-starring appearances in the television programs Kojak, Quincy, M.E., Matt Houston, The Fresh Prince of Bel-Air, Trapper John, M.D., Knight Rider and 21 Jump Street. She joined the cast of the soap opera television series Search for Tomorrow in the role of Dr. Amy Carson along with Joel Higgins, who played journalist Bruce Carson.

Wyndham joined the cast of the new ABC sitcom television series Barney Miller in 1975. Her final credit was from Passions, where she played the role of Nurse Stevens from 2007.

== Filmography ==
=== Television ===
Year	Title	Role	Notes
1972	The Paul Lynde Show	Patsy	Episode: "To Commune or Not to Commune"
1974	Police Story	Terry	Episode: "Love, Mabel"
1974–1981	Barney Miller	Rachel Miller	4 episodes
1975	Kojak	Linda	Episode: "Close Cover Before Killing"
1975–1977	Search for Tomorrow	Dr. Amy Carson	3 episodes
1980	The Diary of Anne Frank	Miep Gies	Television film
1983	Quincy, M.E.	Carol	Episode: "Whatever Happened to Morris Perlmutter?"
1984	Airwolf	Stewardess	Episode: "Flight #093 Is Missing"
1984	Riptide	Mary	Episode: "Be True to Your School"
1984	Knight Rider	Ms. Jordan	Episode: "Lost Knight"
1985	Matt Houston	Adel Marlowe	Episode: "Killing Time"
1986	Trapper John, M.D.	Ginny	Episode: "Self-Diagnosis"
1987	21 Jump Street	Ms. Carlson	Episode: "Bad Influence"
1987	Werewolf	Leah Harris	Episode: "The Boy Who Cried Werewolf"
1989	Hard Time on Planet Earth	Ruth Newcomb	Episode: "Losing Control"
1990	Life Goes On	Anita Khatchadourian	Episode: "Thacher and Henderson"
1993	The Fresh Prince of Bel-Air	Janine	Episode: "Six Degrees of Graduation"
1993	Lois & Clark: The New Adventures of Superman	Reporter No. 2	Episode: "Pilot"
1995	Hearts Afire	Woman	Episode: "John and Georgie's Not-So-Excellent Adventure"
2007	Passions	Nurse Stevens	7 episodes
