= Guest Artist =

2019 film directed by Timothy Busfield

- Directed by: Timothy Busfield
- Screenplay by: Jeff Daniels
- Based on: Guest Artist by Jeff Daniels
- Produced by: Michael A. Alden; Timothy Busfield; Jeff Daniels; Michael Ferdie; Melissa Gilbert; Michael Lohmann; Alyssa Loveall
- Starring: Jeff Daniels
- Cinematography: Wilson Coates Busfield
- Edited by: Alyssa Loveall
- Music by: Ben Daniels
- Production company: Grand River Productions
- Distributed by: Indican Pictures
- Release dates: February 9, 2019 (Santa Barbara); July 10, 2020 (U.S.)
- Running time: 74 minutes
- Country: United States
- Language: English
- Box office: $10,017

Guest Artist is a 2019 American drama film directed by Timothy Busfield and starring Jeff Daniels. The film is based on Daniels' play of the same name.

== Cast ==
- Jeff Daniels as Joseph Harris
- Thomas Macias as Kenneth Waters
- Richard McWilliams as Franz
- Erika Slezak as Helen
- McKara Bechler as Hope
- Dan Johnson as Dan
- Lynch Travis as Larry
- Ruth Crawford as Mary

== Release ==
Guest Artist was featured at the Santa Barbara International Film Festival on February 9, 2019. The film grossed $944 in its opening weekend. While in theatres, Guest Artist grossed $10,017.

=== Home media ===
Guest Artist was released on DVD on October 6, 2020, by Indican Pictures. Some library branches have the DVD. As of July 21, 2020, the film is now available via Apple TV, Google Play, Amazon Prime Video, FandangoNOW, and YouTube Movies.

== Reception ==
On the review aggregator website Rotten Tomatoes, 63% of 8 critics' reviews are positive, with an average rating of 6.3/10.

=== Critical response ===
Glenn Kenny of RogerEbert.com wrote in his review: "What Guest Artist wants most is to make points about history, an artist’s relationship to it, and the perils of self-censorship. It’s, in a sense, real The Newsroom stuff, just within a different milieu. The whole Bitter Master Meets Eager Young Space Cadet Dramaturg scenario is just a pretext for Daniels and Busfield to get some points across."

Sheri Linden of The Hollywood Reporter wrote: "Small-scale, no-frills and lo-fi, Guest Artist feels like a homegrown project mounted by a couple of talented guys from Michigan. Those guys happen to be Timothy Busfield, who directs, and Jeff Daniels, who scripted and stars."

Richard Roeper of the Chicago Sun-Times wrote in his review: "We’re still in the early stages of Guest Artist when it becomes evident this train is never leaving the station — or should I say the main characters are never going to leave the actual train station where the movie is set."
