= The Cool Surface =

- DVD cover
- Directed by: Erik Anjou
- Written by: Erik Anjou
- Produced by: Stephan Bataillard
- Starring: Robert Patrick; Teri Hatcher; Cyril O'Reilly
- Cinematography: Greg Littlewood
- Edited by: Mike Jackson
- Music by: Dave Kopplin
- Release date: April 5, 1994 (Video premiere)
- Running time: 88 minutes
- Country: United States
- Language: English

The Cool Surface (released in the Philippines as The Playmate) is a 1994 thriller film written and directed by Erik Anjou and starring Robert Patrick, Teri Hatcher, Cyril O'Reilly, Matt McCoy, Shannon Dobson and Ian Buchanan.

== Plot ==
A writer returns to Hollywood after finishing his novel in the wilderness. Still smarting from his girlfriend's suicide and his publisher's criticisms of his novel, he becomes intrigued by the neighbor couple's abusive relationship. Eventually he intervenes and becomes involved with the woman, basing a new book on their increasingly violent relationship sparked by his insane jealousy of her friends and her acting career.

== Release ==
The Cool Surface was released direct to video in United States on April 5, 1994. In the Philippines, the film was released in theaters as The Playmate on April 26, 1995.
