= Blood Vows: The Story of a Mafia Wife =

- VHS cover
- Genre: Crime; Drama
- Written by: Guerdon Trueblood
- Directed by: Paul Wendkos
- Starring: Melissa Gilbert; Joe Penny; Eileen Brennan
- Music by: William Goldstein
- Country of origin: United States
- Original language: English

Production
- Executive producer: Louis Rudolph
- Producers: S. Bryan Hickox; Guerdon Trueblood
- Cinematography: Bernd Heinl
- Editors: Steve Cohen; Don Rode
- Running time: 93 minutes
- Production companies: Louis Rudolph Films; Fries Entertainment

Original release
- Network: NBC
- Release: January 18, 1987

Blood Vows: The Story of a Mafia Wife is a 1987 American made-for-television crime drama film starring Melissa Gilbert and Joe Penny, directed by Paul Wendkos. It premiered on NBC on January 18, 1987. The film received generally negative reviews.

== Plot ==
Marian is an up-and-coming fashion designer in New York. One morning, while on her way to work, Marian is mugged. She calls the police and they manage to catch the thief. While waiting at the police station, a handsome Italian attorney named Edward Moran offers to take her home in his limousine. They eventually fall in love and get married. During the wedding celebration, Edward offers to set up in business Marian and her friend Silvia. On their honeymoon, Edward gets called away on business. While he is away, Marian becomes suspicious after several incidents, leading to being dragged off to the family compound for protection. Marian's sister-in-law Gina tells her that the family is part of the Italian Mafia. This is followed by a gun battle between mafia factions, including men in a helicopter shooting up the family compound, killing Gina's husband.

Later, Sylvia tells Marian and Edward of her discovery that the business she has with Marian is a front for importing cocaine. As Marian tells Sylvia that she has decided leave Edward, Sylvia is pushed in front of a car (murdered by the family). Marian goes to the police offering to testify against the family. Despite police protection, the family kidnaps her, and takes her back to Edward. After assuring her that he loves her, Edward shoots and kills Marian for "breaking the rules".

== Cast ==
- Melissa Gilbert as Marian
- Joe Penny as Edward Moran
- Eileen Brennan as Sylvia
- Anthony Franciosa as Lou Di Luca
- Talia Shire as Gina
- Carmine Caridi as Uncle Sal
- Ron Karabatsos as Aldo
- John Aprea as Frank
- Rhoda Gemignani as Mama
- Shiri Appleby
