= Melissa Gilbert =

American actress (born 1964)

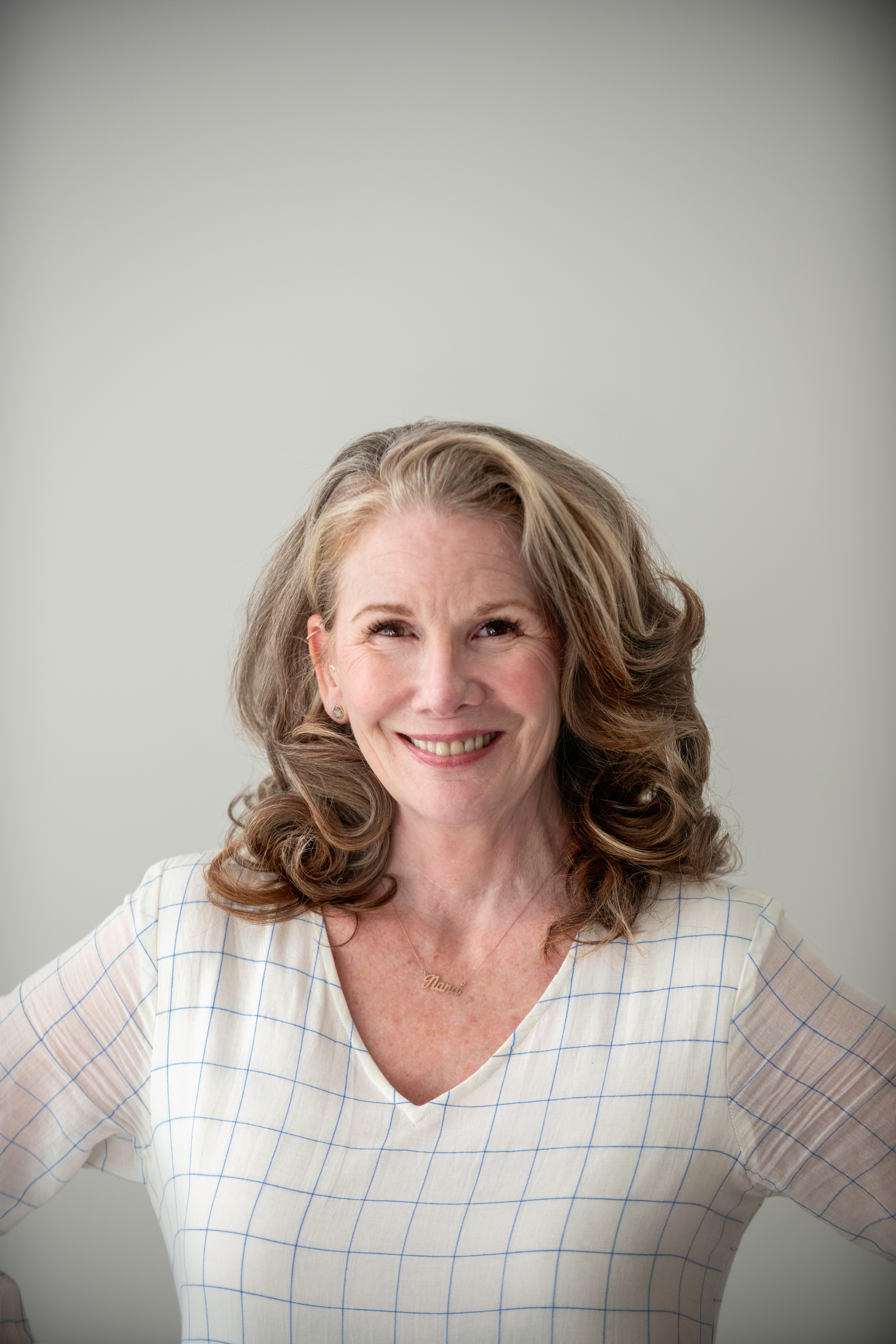
- Gilbert in 2023

President of the Screen Actors Guild
- In office October 15, 2001 – February 22, 2005
- Preceded by: William Daniels
- Succeeded by: Alan Rosenberg

Personal details
- Born: Melissa Ellen Gilbert; May 8, 1964 (age 62) Los Angeles, California, U.S.
- Party: Democratic
- Spouses: Bo Brinkman (m. 1988; div. 1994) Bruce Boxleitner (m. 1995; div. 2011) Timothy Busfield (m. 2013)
- Children: 2
- Parent: Paul Gilbert (father)
- Relatives: Harry Crane (grandfather); Jonathan Gilbert (brother); Sara Gilbert (sister)
- Known for: Little House on the Prairie; The Miracle Worker
- Occupation: Actress; author
- Years active: 1967–present

Melissa Ellen Gilbert (born May 8, 1964) is an American actress. Gilbert began her career as a child actress in the late 1960s, appearing in numerous commercials and guest-starring roles on television. From 1974 to 1983, she starred as Laura Ingalls Wilder, the second-oldest daughter of Charles Ingalls (played by Michael Landon) on the NBC series Little House on the Prairie. During the run of Little House, Gilbert appeared in several television films, including The Miracle Worker (1979) and The Diary of Anne Frank (1980). As an adult, she continued her career mainly in television films. From 2009 to 2010, Gilbert appeared as Caroline "Ma" Ingalls in the touring production of Little House on the Prairie, the Musical. In 2012, she was a contestant on season fourteen of the reality dance competition show Dancing with the Stars on ABC.

Gilbert served as president of the Screen Actors Guild (SAG) from 2001 to 2005. She briefly ran for the U.S. Congress in 2016, but withdrew her candidacy before the election. She is the author of several memoirs, a children's book, and a cookbook.

== Early life ==
Gilbert was born in Los Angeles, California on May 8, 1964, to a newly-engaged couple, exotic dancer Kathy Wood and stock car racer and mechanic David Darlington. She was placed for adoption immediately after birth. She was adopted the next day by actor and comedian Paul Gilbert and his wife, dancer and actress Barbara Crane, the daughter of The Honeymooners creator Harry Crane.

Gilbert was raised in her mother's Jewish religion. The Gilberts later adopted a son, Jonathan, who co-starred on Little House on the Prairie.

Gilbert's parents divorced when she was 6 years old. Her mother then married attorney Harold Abeles, and together they had daughter Sara Rebecca Abeles (the actress known professionally as Sara Gilbert) in 1975. In 1976, Paul Gilbert died. Although 11-year-old Melissa was told that he had suffered a stroke, she found out years later that he had been a VA patient who dealt with chronic pain, and that he had taken his own life. The marriage of Barbara and Harold Abeles later ended in divorce.

When Gilbert introduced herself to her biological father for the first time, her biological mother had already died, but he said "You're Laura, aren't you? I knew it.’"

In 2026, Gilbert learned that she had three older biological siblings on her birth mother's side (Matthew, Steven, and Mark, who had already died). She also has four half-siblings on her biological father's side.

== Career ==
=== Little House on the Prairie ===
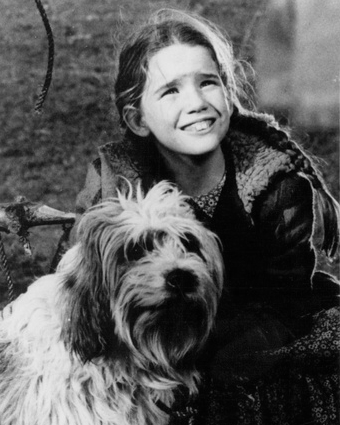
Gilbert as Laura Ingalls, circa 1975

Gilbert's earliest television appearances were in dozens of commercials, including one for Alpo dog food with Lorne Greene (Michael Landon's television father on Bonanza). She also attended school with Landon's daughter, Leslie Landon. It was Leslie who informed her that she had won the role of Laura Ingalls Wilder, the second oldest daughter, on Little House on the Prairie, beating out over 500 child actresses for the part. The pilot was shot in 1973 and was a ratings success. Almost a year later, Gilbert began filming the series. During the show's run, Gilbert appeared in several television films, including The Diary of Anne Frank and The Miracle Worker.

Gilbert became close to the Landon family after her adoptive father died. However, a rift developed between Michael Landon and Gilbert after the revelation of Landon's affair with Little House's young makeup artist, Cindy Clerico. Gilbert had limited contact with Landon after Little House ended during the 1983–84 season. Seven years later, following his May 9, 1991, appearance on The Tonight Show Starring Johnny Carson where he discussed his pancreatic cancer, she was contacted by Landon's family and visited him at his Malibu home. Landon died one week later. When Gilbert gave birth to her son with second husband Bruce Boxleitner on October 6, 1995, they named him Michael, in honor of Landon.

=== Career after Little House ===
Gilbert has continued to work regularly, mainly in television. She starred as Jean Donovan in the biopic Choices of the Heart (1983), and as Anna Sheridan in three episodes of Babylon 5 with then-husband Boxleitner in 1996. She also provided the voice of Barbara Gordon/Batgirl on the 1990s Batman: The Animated Series, though she would be replaced by Mary Kay Bergman for the movie Batman & Mr. Freeze: SubZero and by Tara Strong for the series' follow-up The New Batman Adventures.

For her contribution to the television industry, Gilbert received a star on the Hollywood Walk of Fame at 6429 Hollywood Blvd in 1985. Her then-fiancé, Rob Lowe, was present with her when her star was unveiled during the ceremony.

In 1998, she was inducted into the Western Performers Hall of Fame at the National Cowboy & Western Heritage Museum in Oklahoma City, Oklahoma. In 2006, Gilbert appeared as Shari Noble, a patient looking to reconstruct her nipples after committing zoophilia with her dog in a season four episode of Nip/Tuck.

In 2008 and through 2009, Gilbert played Caroline "Ma" Ingalls in the musical adaptation of Little House on the Prairie. This world premiere production at the Guthrie Theater in Minneapolis was directed by Francesca Zambello and also starred Kara Lindsay as Laura. The show ran through October 19 and was on a US National tour for 2009–10. The tour ended in June 2010 at Starlight Theatre in Kansas City, Missouri.

In March 2012, Gilbert joined the cast of celebrity contestants on season 14 of Dancing with the Stars. She was paired with Maksim Chmerkovskiy. During week four's show, while dancing the Paso Doble, she fell and hit her head on Maksim's leg and suffered a mild concussion and was taken to a hospital. She went home to recuperate, but returned to continue in the competition. In week eight of competition, she was eliminated, finishing in fifth place.

In March and April 2018, Gilbert starred in an Off-Off-Broadway, limited-run production of Geraldine Aron's 2001 one-woman play My Brilliant Divorce.

=== Screen Actors Guild presidency (2001–2005) ===
Gilbert was elected president of the Screen Actors Guild in 2001 after a contentious candidacy, in which she ultimately beat her opponent, Rhoda actress Valerie Harper. In 2003, she was re-elected, defeating Kent McCord with 50% of the vote to his 42%. In July 2005, she announced that she would not seek a third term.

=== 2016 congressional campaign ===
On August 10, 2015, Gilbert announced her campaign for Michigan's 8th congressional district in the 2016 elections to the United States House of Representatives. Gilbert, who was the presumptive Democratic nominee in the district, dropped out of the race in May 2016, citing health issues.

In 2022, Gilbert launched a lifestyle app aimed at women called Modern Prairie.

== Personal life ==
=== Relationships ===
Gilbert was married to actor Bo Brinkman from 1988 to 1994, and to actor Bruce Boxleitner from 1995 to 2011.

In January 2013, Gilbert's representative confirmed her engagement to actor Timothy Busfield. They married on April 24, 2013, lived in Howell, Michigan, from 2013 to 2018, and moved to New York City late in 2018. Also in 2018, the couple purchased a cottage in the Catskill Mountains in upstate New York; they said they were renovating it and intended to make it their permanent home.

In January 2026, a warrant was issued for Busfield concerning allegations of the sexual assault of twin boys during the filming of the TV series The Cleaning Lady, which he has denied. Afterward, Gilbert deactivated her accounts on Instagram and Threads.

=== Tax issues ===
Following her announcement as a candidate for U.S. Representative from Michigan, a spokesperson for her opponent's campaign referred to Gilbert as a "tax cheat". Gilbert owed $360,000 in back federal taxes and $112,000 in California state taxes. Gilbert responded by stating that this is not true, that the tax debt was an outgrowth of a stalled acting career, the economy, and divorce. She also stated that she had negotiated a repayment plan with the IRS.

=== Health issues ===
In her late thirties, Gilbert battled addiction to prescription medication and alcohol.

While playing the role of Caroline "Ma" Ingalls in the touring musical Little House on the Prairie, a visit to the doctor revealed that Gilbert had been working with a broken back for months. On July 22, 2010, Gilbert underwent surgery to replace a disc as well as fuse a vertebra in her lower spine. The surgery was described as a complete success.

In January 2015, Gilbert decided to have her breast implants removed for health reasons.

Gilbert has misophonia.

== Filmography ==
=== Film ===
Year	Title	Role	Notes
1967	The Reluctant Astronaut	Niece	
1979	Nutcracker Fantasy	Clara	Voice
1985	Sylvester	Charlie	
1986	Drug Free Kids: A Parents' Guide		Video
1987	Blood Vows: The Story of a Mafia Wife	Marian (Wife)	Film
1989	Ice House	Kay	Shattered Trust
2007	Safe Harbour	Ophelia MacKenzie	Video
2015	One Smart Fellow	Ellen	Short film
2019	Guest Artist		Producer
2019	When We Last Spoke	Ruby	

=== Television ===
Year	Title	Role	Notes
1968	The Dean Martin Comedy Hour	Girl on Santa's Lap	Episode: "1968 Christmas Show"
1972	Gunsmoke	Spratt's Child	Episode: "The Judgement"
1972	Emergency!	Jenny	Episode: "Dinner Date"
1973	Tenafly	Suzie's sister	Episode: "The Cash and Carry Caper"
1974–1983	Little House on the Prairie	Laura Ingalls	Main role
1977	Christmas Miracle in Caufield, U.S.A.	Kelly Sullivan	TV movie
1978	The Love Boat	Rosemary 'Rocky' Simpson	Episode: "Rocky"
1978	The Hanna-Barbera Happy Hour	Herself	Episode 1.2
1979	The Miracle Worker	Helen Keller	TV movie
1979	The Little House Years	Laura Ingalls Wilder	TV movie
1980	The Diary of Anne Frank	Anne Frank	TV movie
1981	Splendor in the Grass	Wilma Dean 'Deanie' Loomis	TV movie
1983	Choices of the Heart	Jean Donovan	TV movie
1983	Little House: Look Back to Yesterday	Laura Ingalls Wilder	TV movie
1984	Little House: The Last Farewell	Laura Ingalls Wilder	TV movie
1984	Family Secrets	Sara Calloway	TV movie
1984	Little House: Bless All the Dear Children	Laura Ingalls Wilder	TV movie
1985	Faerie Tale Theatre	Gerda	Episode: "The Snow Queen"
1986	Choices	Terry Granger	TV movie
1986	Penalty Phase	Leah Furman	TV movie
1987	Blood Vows: The Story of a Mafia Wife	Marian	TV movie
1988	Killer Instinct	Dr. Lisa DaVito	TV movie
1989	Ice House	Kay	TV movie
1989	Chameleons		TV movie
1990	Without Her Consent	Emily Briggs	TV movie
1990	Forbidden Nights	Judith Shapiro	TV movie
1990	Joshua's Heart	Claudia	TV movie
1990	Donor	Dr. Kristine Lipton	TV movie
1990	The Lookalike	Gina / Jennifer	TV movie
1991	The Hidden Room		Episode: "Spirit Cabinet"
1992	Stand by Your Man	Rochelle Dunphy	Main role
1992	With a Vengeance	Jenna King / Valerie Tanner	TV movie
1992–1994	Batman: The Animated Series	Barbara Gordon / Batgirl	Voice - 6 Episodes: I Am the Night, Heart of Steel, Shadow of the Bat and Batgirl Returns
1993	Family of Strangers	Julie Lawson	TV movie
1993	With Hostile Intent	Miranda Berkley	TV movie
1993	Shattered Trust: The Shari Karney Story	Shari Karney	TV movie
1993	House of Secrets	Marion Ravinel	TV movie
1993	Dying to Remember	Lynn Matthews	TV movie
1994	The Babymaker: The Dr. Cecil Jacobson Story	Mary Bennett	TV movie
1994	Against Her Will: The Carrie Buck Story	Melissa Prentice	TV movie
1994	Asbestos in Obstetrics	Fire Captain	TV movie
1994	Cries from the Heart	Karen Barth	TV movie
1994–1995	Sweet Justice	Kate Delacroy	Main role
1995	Zoya	Zoya Ossipov	TV movie
1996	Babylon 5	Anna Sheridan	3 episodes
1996	A Holiday for Love	Emma Murphy	TV movie
1997	Seduction in a Small Town	Sarah Jenks	TV movie
1997	Childhood Sweetheart?	Karen Carlson	TV movie
1998	The Outer Limits	Teresa Janovitch	Episode: "Relativity Theory"
1998	Murder at 75 Birch	Gwen Todson	TV movie
1998	Her Own Rules	Meredith Sanders	TV movie
1998	Touched by an Angel	Michelle Tanner	Episode: "The Peacemaker"
1999	The Soul Collector	Rebecca	TV movie
1999	Mistaken Identity	Sarah Barlow	TV movie
2000	A Vision of Murder: The Story of Donielle	Donielle	TV movie
2001	Sanctuary	Jo Ellen Hathaway	TV movie
2002	Providence	Lorna Berlin	Episode: "Smoke and Mirrors"
2002	Presidio Med	Grace Bennett	Episode: "Once Upon a Family"
2003	Then Came Jones	Devon Jones-Thomas	TV movie
2003	Storyline Online	Herself	Episode: "My Rotten Redheaded Older Brother"
2003	Hollywood Wives: The New Generation	Taylor Singer	TV movie
2004	Heart of the Storm	Cassie Broadbeck	TV movie
2005	Thicker than Water	Natalie Travers	TV movie
2005	Fat Actress	Herself	Episode: "Charlie's Angels or Too Pooped to Pop"
2005	7th Heaven	Marie Wagner	Episode: "Honor Thy Mother"
2006	Nip/Tuck	Shari Noble	Episode: "Shari Noble"
2007	Sacrifices of the Heart	Kate Weston / Anne Weston	TV movie
2011	The Christmas Pageant	Vera Parks	TV movie
2012	Dancing with the Stars	Herself (Contestant)	14 episodes
2015	The Night Shift	Lindsay	Episode: "Hold On"
2015	Secrets and Lies	Lisa Daly	5 episodes
2017	Tenure	Tilly Masters	TV movie
2018	Hometown Christmas	Mary Russell	TV movie
2025–2026	When Calls the Heart	Georgie McGill	7 episodes

== Awards and nominations ==
Year	Award	Category	Title of work	Result
1980	Primetime Emmy Awards	Outstanding Lead Actress in a Limited Series or a Special	The Miracle Worker	Nominated
1980	Young Artist Award	Best Juvenile Actress in a TV Series or Special	Little House on the Prairie	Nominated
1981	Golden Globe Award	Best Actress – Television Series Drama	Little House on the Prairie	Nominated
1982	Young Artist Award	Best Young Actress in a Television Special	Splendor in the Grass	Nominated
1983	Young Artist Award	Best Young Actress in a Drama Series	Little House on the Prairie	Won
1984	Young Artist Award	Best Young Actress in a Drama Series	Little House on the Prairie	Won
2000	Golden Boot Awards	Golden Boot	n/a	Won
2006	TV Land Awards	Most Memorable Kiss	Little House on the Prairie	Won

== Books ==
- Gilbert, Melissa (2009). Prairie Tale: A Memoir (1st ed.). Gallery Books. ISBN 978-1-416-59914-2. (Memoir)
- Daisy and Josephine (2014) (Children's Book)
- My Prairie Cookbook: Memories and Frontier Food from My Little House to Yours (2014). (Cookbook)
- Back to the Prairie: A Home Remade, A Life Rediscovered. (2022) (Memoir)
