= Timothy Busfield =

American actor and director (born 1957)

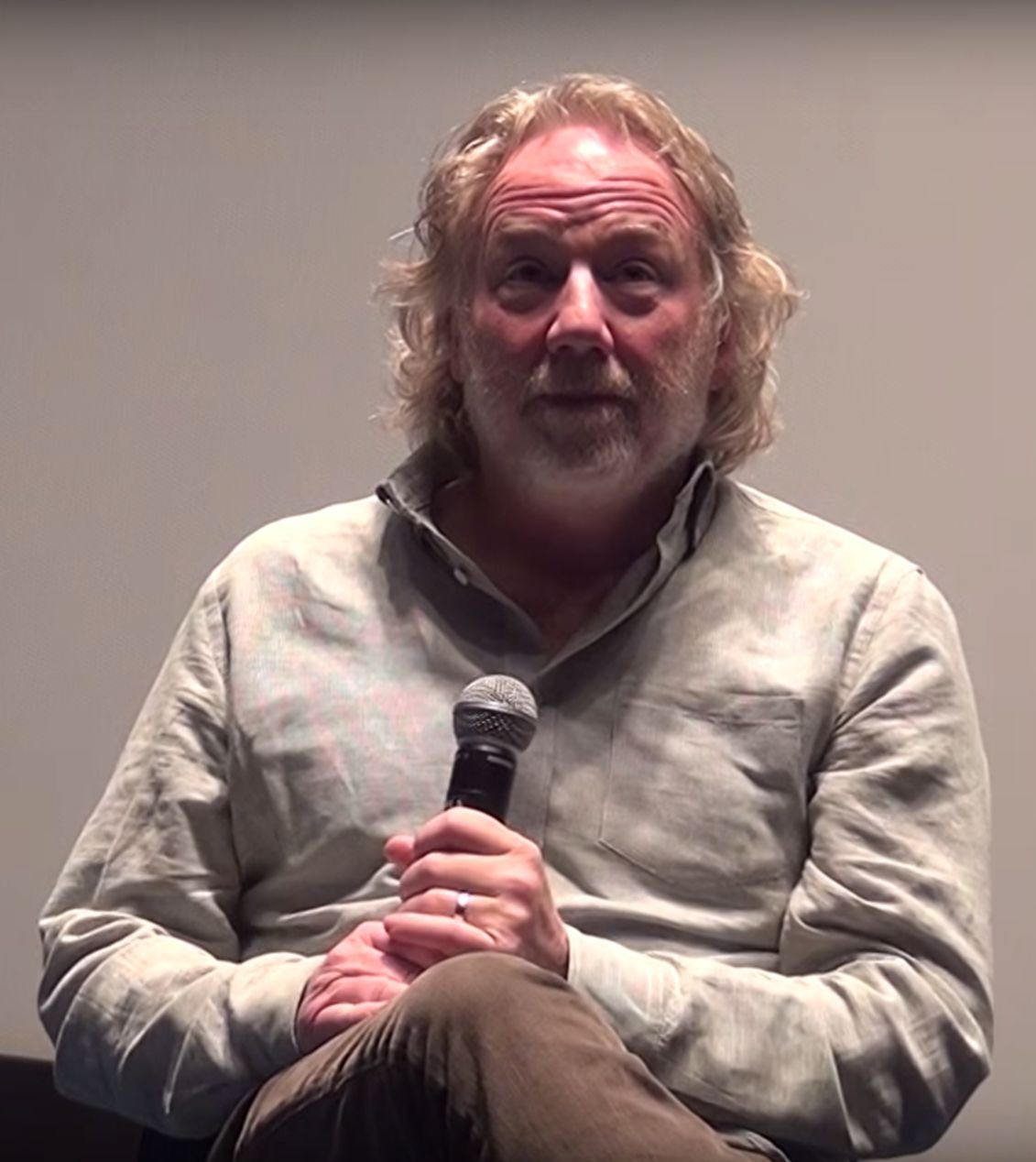
- Busfield in 2016
- Born: June 12, 1957 (age 69); Lansing, Michigan, U.S.
- Occupations: Actor, director
- Years active: 1981–present
- Known for: Thirtysomething, The West Wing
- Spouses: Radha Delamarter (m. 1982; div. 1986) Jennifer Merwin (m. 1988; div. 2007) Melissa Gilbert (m. 2013)
- Children: 3 (Note: 3 biological children and 2 stepchildren.)

Timothy Busfield (born June 12, 1957) is an American actor and director. He played Arnold Poindexter in the first two Revenge of the Nerds films, Elliot Weston on the television series Thirtysomething, Mark in Field of Dreams, and Danny Concannon on the television series The West Wing. In 1991, he received a Primetime Emmy Award for Outstanding Supporting Actor in a Drama Series for Thirtysomething.

Busfield has been accused of sexual assault against five children and three adults, with the allegations occurring once in 1994, once in 2012, and six times in 2026. The 1994 case resulted in a settlement for the alleged victim. The 2026 allegations resulted in him being arrested and also dropped by talent agency Innovative Artists. He denied the allegations through his lawyer.

== Early life and education ==
Busfield was born June 12, 1957, in Lansing, Michigan, to drama professor Roger Busfield and Michigan State University Press director Jean Busfield. He graduated from East Lansing High School in East Lansing in 1975. Busfield studied at East Tennessee State University for two years.

== Career ==
=== Acting and directing ===
Busfield began his professional career in theater serving as an understudy to Matthew Broderick in Brighton Beach Memoirs in 1982. The following year, he relocated to Los Angeles and joined the cast of ABC's short-lived sitcom Reggie (1983), an American adaptation of the BBC series The Fall and Rise of Reginald Perrin.

In 1984, Busfield gained wider recognition with his first substantial film role as Arnold Poindexter, a member of the Lambda Lambda Lambda fraternity, in the comedy Revenge of the Nerds (1984), later reprising the role in Revenge of the Nerds II (1987). That same year, he joined the cast of the CBS medical drama Trapper John, M.D. as J.T. McIntyre, a role he played until the series concluded in 1986.

Following Trapper John, M.D., Busfield and his brother Buck founded the Fantasy Theatre, a professional touring company for children's audiences, later designated California's Honorary State Children's Theater. Based in Sacramento, California, the brothers also established the B Street Theatre in 1992, focusing on adult stage productions.

In 1987, Busfield was cast as Elliot Weston on the ABC drama thirtysomething, marking his first major mature role. His performance earned three Emmy nominations, culminating in a win in 1991 shortly before the series ended.

During this period, Busfield appeared as the antagonist Mark in Field of Dreams (1989). In 1990, he replaced Tom Hulce as the lead in the Broadway production of A Few Good Men. That year, he also made his directorial debut on thirtysomething, directing three episodes. Subsequent film roles included supporting performances in Sneakers (1992), Quiz Show (1994), and the family sports film Little Big League (1994), in which he portrayed Minnesota Twins first baseman Lou Collins, a character loosely based on first baseman Kent Hrbek.

Busfield returned to network television throughout the 1990s, starring as the head of the Byrd family in The Byrds of Paradise (ABC, 1993–94), and as one of several former high school athletes in the comedy-drama Champs (ABC, 1996). By the late 1990s, he increasingly split his time between acting and directing, helming multiple episodes of Sports Night (ABC, 1998–2000), Ed (NBC, 2000–04)—on which he also served as co-executive producer and guest-starred as Ed's brother Lloyd—and other network series.

During this era, Busfield began a recurring role as Danny Concannon on The West Wing, appearing intermittently throughout the show's run. He later directed and executive produced the CBS drama Without a Trace (2002–09), occasionally appearing onscreen as Jack Malone's lawyer. He also directed episodes of Las Vegas, Damages, and Studio 60 on the Sunset Strip, on which he co-starred as control director Cal Shanley. He subsequently served as executive producer of Lipstick Jungle (NBC, 2008–09).

From 2014 to 2015, Busfield guest starred on Sleepy Hollow as Benjamin Franklin.

In 2019, Busfield directed Guest Artist, which premiered at the Santa Barbara International Film Festival. The project launched Grand River Productions, a production company formed by Jeff Daniels, Busfield, and Busfield's wife, Melissa Gilbert. Also in 2019, he guest starred in Dolly Parton's Heartstrings as Logan Cantrell in the episode "Sugar Hill".

In 2020, Busfield appeared as a guest during the Studio 60 on the Sunset Strip marathon fundraiser episode of The George Lucas Talk Show and voiced the title character in the Marvel/SiriusXM radio drama podcast series Marvel’s Wastelanders: Star-Lord.

=== Baseball ===
In the summer of 1992, Busfield signed as a pitcher with the semi-pro Sacramento Smokeys. He pitched for the Smokeys in between acting jobs through the 2000 season, amassed a pitching record of 30 wins and 12 losses over 9 seasons. In 2024, he was inducted into the Sacramento Baseball Hall of Fame as a pitcher.

=== Stage and theater ===
Busfield's theater credits include A Few Good Men and Brighton Beach Memoirs. Off-Broadway, he worked with Circle Repertory Company in 1982. With his elder brother Buck, he is co-founder of the B Street Theatre in Sacramento, California. The brothers also established Fantasy Theater, a touring troupe that plays to children. Busfield has written children's plays for the Fantasy troupe.

== Legal issues ==
=== 1994 sexual assault allegation ===
In 1994, a female extra accused Busfield of sexual assault during the filming of Little Big League in 1993. She said, "I was 17 at the time, my friend was 18. It was just really strange saying things and way too interested in talking to a 17-year-old. At some point, I did try to leave, and he pinned me against the refrigerator in the trailer, with his foot in my crotch." Busfield denied the allegations and filed a countersuit against the girl's lawyers, accusing them of defamation. The actor eventually settled the lawsuit for an undisclosed amount.

In 1996, a judge ordered the actor to pay US$150,000 (equivalent to about $308,000 in 2025) to the Minneapolis law firm that had represented the accuser following the loss of his defamation suit.

=== 2012 sexual assault allegation ===
In 2012, a 28-year-old therapist named Dana Rogers accused Busfield of groping her while the two were on a date attending a film at a Los Angeles-area movie theater, but the Los Angeles City Attorney's Office declined to file charges against him, citing insufficient evidence. Busfield said "the contact was consensual." In October 2026, Rogers publicly identified herself in a Radar Online article, further saying, "He groped me on every body part I have. He went down inside my underwear. He inserted his fingers in me. I kept saying, 'Get off of me, get off me now, get off of me now. Get off of me now.'" She called Busfield a "sexual deviant" and "narcissist".

=== 2026 sexual abuse charges ===
On January 9, 2026, American media reported that a warrant had been issued in New Mexico for Busfield's arrest. He was accused of sexually assaulting twin boys on set during the filming of the TV series The Cleaning Lady. The boys' parent said that the abuse occurred from November 2022 until early 2024. Busfield faces two counts of sexual abuse involving a minor and one count of child abuse, and an arrest warrant was issued by the Albuquerque Police Department. The investigation against Busfield reportedly began after the alleged abuse was first reported by a University of New Mexico doctor in November 2024. Busfield's legal counsel described the charges as trumped-up allegations from the child actors' family because the boys had been fired from the show.

After news of the alleged sexual abuse came out, NBC decided not to broadcast a Law & Order: Special Victims Unit episode in which Busfield played a judge, with Amazon MGM Studios also editing out his scenes in You Deserve Each Other. On January 12, after police officers were unable to find Busfield three days after his arrest warrant was issued, the U.S. Marshals Service joined the case to apprehend him. He turned himself in to Albuquerque authorities on January 13. He denied the allegations and his lawyers have argued that an independent investigation by Warner Bros. found the allegations unfounded and that he passed a polygraph test.

Busfield was dropped by Innovative Artists, a talent agency, after the allegations. He denied the allegations through his lawyer. On February 6, 2026, Busfield was charged with four counts of criminal sexual contact of a child by the Bernalillo County District Attorney's Office in New Mexico. In June, Busfield filed a motion to dismiss the grand jury indictment, alleging "egregious prosecutorial misconduct during grand jury proceedings, thereby preventing the jurors from hearing testimony, witnesses and evidence even after repeated requests by the grand jury itself." In October, the dismissal of the initial set of charges against Busfield was approved by the judge overseeing the case, "citing prosecutorial misconduct and errors that undermined the grand jury process."

=== January 2026 sexual assault allegation ===
After news of Busfield's sexual abuse charges were made public in January 2026, a man reported to law enforcement on January 14, 2026, that years earlier Busfield had abused his then 16-year-old daughter, having "kissed her and put his hands down her pants and touched her privates" during an audition.

=== March 2026 sexual assault and harassment allegations ===
In March 2026, American actress Claudia Christian alleged Busfield sexually assaulted her while the two were filming Strays in 1991, when she was 26 years old. Christian said that while the two were rehearsing lines in his trailer, Busfield grabbed her, threw her against the wall, and started kissing her, adding, "He had an erection and he shoved his tongue in my mouth and I pushed him off and I ran out of the trailer." She reported the incident to an assistant director and her husband but did not go to law enforcement at the time. In March 2026, she filed a police report, which was subsequently obtained by the Daily Mirror tabloid.

Following the first March 2026 allegation, a second woman reported to police that Busfield sexually assaulted her when she was a 16-year-old intern at the B Street Theatre in 1999. She said, "He grabbed me in between the legs and pulled me down from the ladder and turned me around and stuck his tongue down my throat and touched me all over aggressively. And I pushed him off of me."

A third woman went to police in March 2026, saying while she was working as a personal assistant for Busfield and his wife from 2017 to 2019, "Busfield made inappropriate comments, was manipulative, and she didn't feel safe being alone with him." She further said he touched her on her thighs while she was in a car, which made her very uncomfortable. The incident happened when she was 22.

In March 2026, a woman went to law enforcement reporting that while she was shopping for books for her children, she encountered Busfield, who began saying graphic things to her. She said he then followed her from that store to her car, then to another business, while trying to finish the conversation. She said, "It was very bizarre. It was very disturbing. It was extremely aggressive. And it was totally uninvited on my part. I didn't understand why he just suddenly went there, and I tried to just say, okay, I'll talk to you later. I have to go. It was relentless. And I rolled up my window."

== Personal life ==
=== Relationships and marriages ===
Busfield's first marriage was to actress and director Radha Delamarter, with whom he has a son. The couple divorced in 1986. In 1988, he married fashion designer Jennifer Merwin, with whom he has two children. He and Merwin filed for divorce in 2007.

Busfield and actress Melissa Gilbert married on April 24, 2013, in a private ceremony at San Ysidro Ranch in Santa Barbara, California. They lived in Howell, Michigan, from 2013 to 2018, and Busfield was an artist in residence at Michigan State University in East Lansing during the 2016–17 academic year. The couple moved to New York City in late 2018.

=== Residences ===
Along with Gilbert, Busfield owns a one-bedroom apartment in the Upper West Side of New York City. In 2019, the couple purchased a two-bedroom, one-bathroom Catskills cabin for $98,000, which they dubbed The Cabbage. The couple moved out of the Upper West Side apartment and into The Cabbage permanently in June 2026.

== Filmography ==
=== As actor ===
==== Film ====
Year	Title	Role	Notes
1981	Stripes	Soldier With Mortar	
1984	Revenge of the Nerds	Arnold Poindexter	
1987	Revenge of the Nerds II: Nerds in Paradise	Arnold Poindexter	
1989	Field of Dreams	Mark	
1992	Sneakers	Dick Gordon	
1993	The Skateboard Kid	Frank	
1993	Striking Distance	Officer Sacco	
1994	Murder Between Friends	District Attorney John Thorn	
1994	Little Big League	Lou Collins	
1994	Quiz Show	Fred	
1996	First Kid	Secret Service Agent Woods	
1998	The Souler Opposite	Robert Levin	
2002	Terminal Error	Elliot Nescher	
2003	National Security	Officer Charlie Reed	
2005	The Naked Brothers Band: The Movie	Himself	
2012	Save the Date	Benjie	
2013	23 Blast	Jasper A. Duncan	
2022	The Independent	Tom Mayfield	

==== Television ====
Year	Title	Role	Notes
1983	Reggie	Mark Potter	6 episodes
1984	AfterMASH	Prentiss	Episode: "C.Y.A."
1984	The Paper Chase	Barrett	Episode: "The Advocates"
1984–1986	Family Ties	Doug / Young Matt Gilbert	3 episodes
1984–1986	Trapper John, M.D.	Dr. John "J.T." McIntyre Jr., M.D.	39 episodes
1985	Hotel	Robert Bianca	Episode: "Imperfect Union"
1987	Matlock	Adam Gardner	Episode: "The Rat Pack"
1987–1991	Thirtysomething	Elliot Weston	85 episodes
1991	Strays	Paul Jarrett	Television film
1992	Calendar Girl, Cop, Killer? The Bambi Bembenek Story	Fred Schultz	Television Film
1993	Screen One	Ephraim Lipshitz	Episode: "Wall of Silence"
1994	The Byrds of Paradise	Sam Byrd	12 episodes
1995	Kidnapped: In the Line of Duty	Pete Honeycutt	Television film
1995	The Outer Limits	Dr. Jon Holland	Episode: "Under the Bed"
1996	Lois & Clark: The New Adventures of Superman	Spy Guy	Episode: "Seconds" uncredited
1996	Champs	Tom McManus	12 episodes
1997	Tracey Takes On...	Businessman #2	Episode: "Food"
1997	Trucks	Ray Porter	Television film
1997	Buffalo Soldiers	Major Robert Carr	Television film
1997	What's Right With America	Walter Gordon	Television special
1999	Time at the Top	Frank Shawson	Television film
1999–2006	The West Wing	Danny Concannon	28 episodes
2000	Rude Awakening	John	Episode: "If I Could See Me Now: Part 2"
2001	Cover Me	Detective Mackowitz	Episode: "Home for the Holidays"
2002	Dead in a Heartbeat	Zachary Franklin	Television film
2002–2004	Ed	Lloyd Stevens	3 episodes
2004	Without a Trace	Ed Felder	3 episodes
2005–2009	Entourage	TV Director / Himself	3 episodes
2006–2007	Studio 60 on the Sunset Strip	Cal Shanley	22 episodes
2010	Law & Order	Ray Backlund	Episode: "Brilliant Disguise"
2010	Outlaw	District Attorney Mereta	Episode: "In Re: Tracy Vidalin"
2011	Beyond the Blackboard	School District HR Representative	Television film
2011	Law & Order: Special Victims Unit	Daniel Carter	Episode: "Russian Brides"
2012	Blue Bloods	Charles Bynes	Episode: "Leap of Faith"
2012	Childrens Hospital	Dr. Bloomfield	Episode: "Behind the Scenes"
2012–2013	The Mob Doctor	David Ellis	2 episodes
2013	Revolution	Dr. Ethan Camp	Episode: "The Love Boat"
2013	Perception	George	Episode: "Neuropositive"
2014–2015	Sleepy Hollow	Benjamin Franklin	3 episodes
2015	The Night Shift	Shane	Episode: "Hold On"
2015	Secrets and Lies	John Garner	4 episodes
2018	One Dollar	Uncle Rich	2 episodes
2018–2019	Designated Survivor	Dr. Adam Louden	4 episodes
2019	The Loudest Voice	Neil Mullin	2 episodes
2019	Dolly Parton's Heartstrings	Logan Cantrell	Episode: "Sugar Hill"
2019–2020	Almost Family	Ron Doyle	6 episodes
2020–2021	For Life	Henry Roswell	Main role; 19 episodes
2020	The George Lucas Talk Show	Himself	Episode: "Stu-D2 1138 on the Binary Sunset Sith"
2023	Citadel	Therapist Simmons	Episode: "The Human Enigma"
2023	Billions	Dr. Marc Ruloff	Episode: "DMV"
2025	The Cleaning Lady	Immigration Officer	Episode: "My Way"

=== As director ===
Year	Title	Notes
1987–91	Thirtysomething	3 episodes
2000	Sports Night	2 episodes
2000–01	Cover Me	2 episodes
2000–01	Rude Awakening	4 episodes
2000–04	Ed	9 episodes
2001	First Years	2 episodes
2001	Lizzie McGuire	2 episodes
2001	Danny	Unaired episodes
2002	That's Life	Episode: "Momento"
2002–09	Without a Trace	8 episodes
2003	American Dreams	Episode: "Another Saturday Night"
2003	Miss Match	Episode: "Bad Judgement"
2003–07	Las Vegas	8 episodes
2004	Joan of Arcadia	Episode: "Jump"
2004	Good Girls Don't...	Episode: "My Best Friend is a Big Slut" (pilot)
2004	Summerland	Episode: "To Thine Self Be True"
2006–07	Studio 60 on the Sunset Strip	6 episodes
2007–11	Damages	5 episodes
2008	Canterbury's Law	Episode: "Trade-off"
2008	The Ex List	Episode: "Pilot"
2008	Lipstick Jungle	8 episodes
2009	Maneater	Miniseries
2009	Lie to Me	Episode: "Honey"
2009	White Collar	Episode: "Flip the Coin"
2010	The Deep End	2 episodes
2010	Mercy	Episode: "Too Much Attitude and Not Enough Underwear"
2010	Outlaw	Episode: "In re :Officer Daniel Hale"
2010	No Ordinary Family	Episode: "No Ordinary Quake"
2010	The Defenders	Episode: "Las Vegas vs. Johnson"
2010–11	The Glades	3 episodes
2011	Normal	Made-for-TV movie premiered on Lifetime
2011	Love Bites	Episode: "Sky High"
2011	Against the Wall	Episode: "Obsessed and Unwanted"
2012	Psych	Episode: "Shawn and the Girl"
2012	Breaking In	Episode: "Games of Jones"
2012	Franklin & Bash	Episode: "Viper"
2012–13	The Client List	3 episodes
2013	Wedding Band	Episode: "End of the World as We Know It"
2013	The Fosters	2 episodes
2013	Childrens Hospital	2 episodes
2014	Mind Games	2 episodes
2015	Secrets and Lies	2 episodes
2015	Graceland	Episode: "Savior Complex"
2015	Rosewood	Episode: "Fireflies and Fidelity"
2015	One Smart Fellow	Short film Also directed with Tommy Lohmann
2015–17	The Night Shift	7 episodes
2016	Second Chance	Episode: "One More Notch"
2016	Aquarius	2 episodes
2017	This Is Us	Episode: "The Right Thing to Do"
2017	Tenure	Made-for-TV movie premiered on Lifetime
2017–18	Nashville	3 episodes
2018	The Rookie	Episode: "The Hawke"
2018–19	Designated Survivor	3 episodes
2019	Guest Artist	Drama film
2019	Law & Order: Special Victims Unit	2 episodes
2019	Dolly Parton's Heartstrings	Episode: "If I Had Wings"
2020	The Conners	Episode: "Brothers, Babies, and Breakdowns"
2021–23	Chicago Med	4 episodes
2021–23	FBI	2 episodes
2022	Marvel's Wastelanders	10 episodes Podcast
2022	FBI: Most Wanted	Episode: "Decriminalized"
2022–25	The Cleaning Lady	6 episodes
2023	Law & Order	Episode: "Land of Opportunity"

== Theater ==
Year	Title	Role	Venue	Notes	Ref.
1983	Brighton Beach Memoirs	Eugene Jerome	Alvin Theatre / Neil Simon Theatre	Standby	
1990	A Few Good Men	Lt. (j.g.) Daniel A. Kaffee	Music Box Theatre	Replacement	
