= List of surviving Boeing B-17 Flying Fortresses =

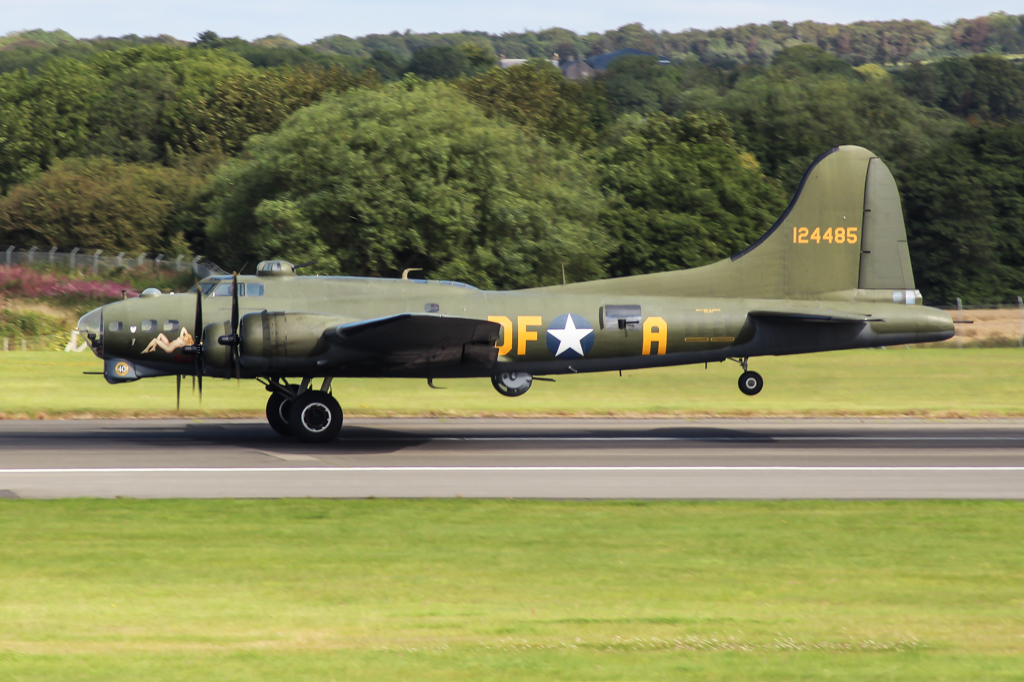
Sally B (44–85784), an airworthy B-17 based in Duxford, England, taking off in 2015

The Boeing B-17 Flying Fortress is an American four-engine heavy bomber used by the United States Army Air Forces and other Allied air forces during World War II. Forty-five planes survive in complete form, (Note: Not included is 44-83387 (see Re-build projects) of which only the fuselage survives.) including 38 in the United States with many preserved in museum displays. The number of operational B-17s has dwindled over time, but there are still several in flying condition.

Of the 12,731 B-17s built, about 4,735 were lost during the war. After the war, planes that had flown in combat missions were sent for scrapping at boneyards, such as those at Walnut Ridge and Kingman. Consequently, only six planes that survive today have seen combat. Most of the other survivors were built too late to see active service and then were used through the 1950s and 1960s in military and civilian capacities. Many are painted to represent actual planes that flew in combat.

== Surviving aircraft ==
Surviving aircraft including some in the collection of museums, some in private ownership, and some in the ownership of flying clubs. Surviving aircraft may or may not be flight capable. The number of flight-capable B-17s has dwindled as the aircraft have aged. There may also be undiscovered wrecks, such as those lost at sea. Partially complete aircraft or wrecks that have been found are listed below.

As of June 2024, aviation website aerovintage.com lists four B-17s as "Operational (Flying)" (G-BEDF/44-85784, N9323Z/44-83514, N3193G/44-85829, and N3701G/44-8543) and three as "Long Term Maintenance back to Operational" (N5017N/44-85740, N207EV/44-83785, and N900RW/44-85718)—this may vary from content below that is based on other sources updated at differing regularity.

=== FAA registered aircraft ===
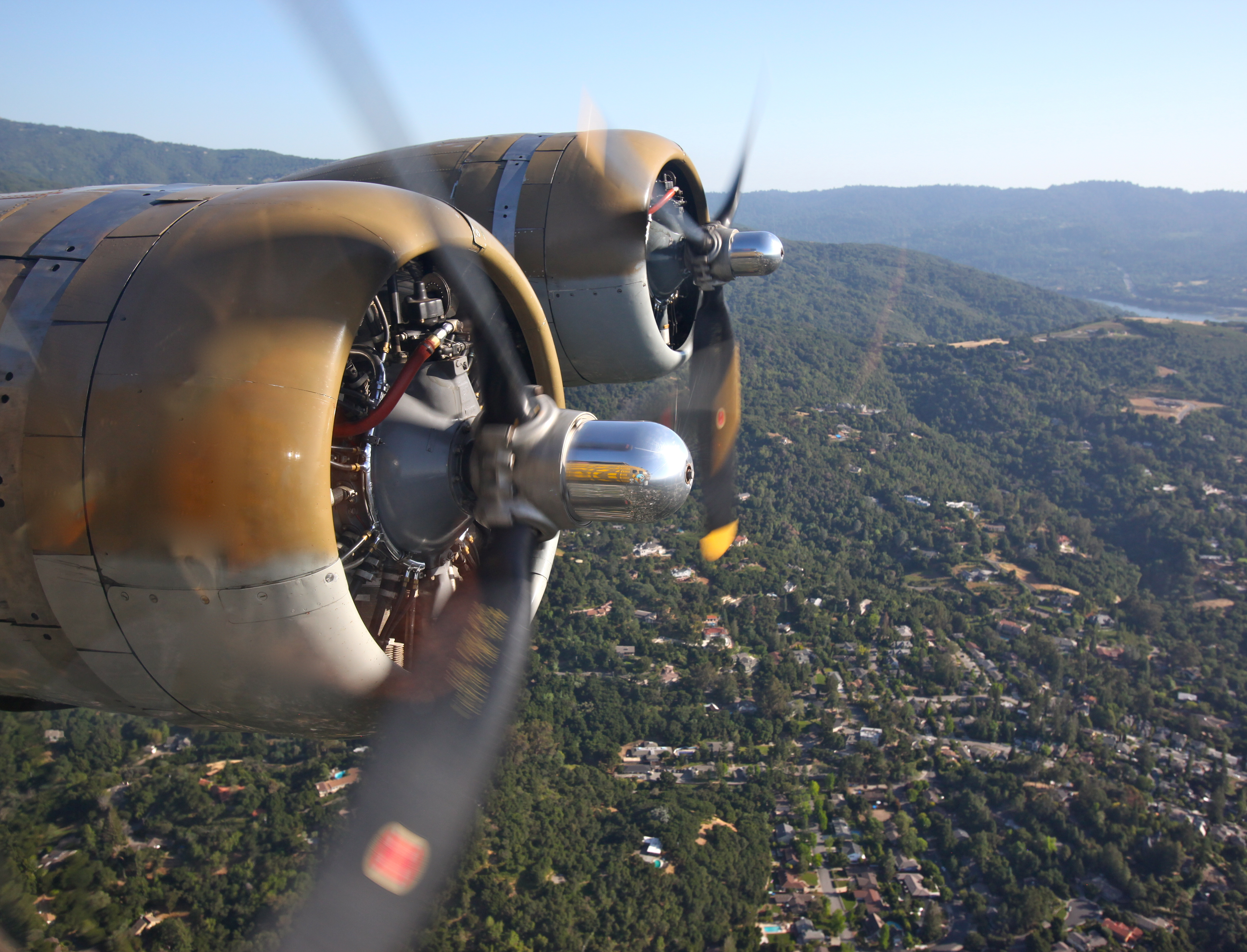
Radial engines of B-17 in flight

As of December 2022, 18 B-17s were registered with the Federal Aviation Administration (FAA). These include Nine-O-Nine (N93012, crashed in October 2019), Texas Raiders (N7227C, crashed in November 2022), and a B-17G registered in Granite Falls, Minnesota (N4960V) that was scrapped in 1962. The other 15 are in the following table.

Of the B-17s registered with a civil aviation authority, such as the FAA, less than 10 are being kept in airworthy condition, and some of those have not been flown for more than five years. Some other B-17s are being restored, and may become airworthy in the future.

=== Aircraft by manufacturer (2022) ===
This is listing of surviving B-17 aircraft registered by the FAA in 2022, noting the status for each (which is periodically updated, per cited sourcing).

Bold denotes a plane that is airworthy at that time, excluding planes that have not been flown for more than five years. There are six as of the early 2020s.
Italics denotes a plane that is potentially airworthy, but has not been flown in the past five years. There are three.
‡ denotes a plane that was used in combat. There are six.

Manufactured		Surviving	
Plant	Total	Number	Serial numbers (built as) (Note: Displayed-as serial numbers may differ.)
Boeing Seattle (BO)	6,981	9	40-3097‡, 41-2446‡, 41-2595, 41-9032, 41-9210, 41-24485‡, 42-29782, 42-32076‡, 43-38635
Douglas Long Beach (DL)	3,000	21	42-3374, 44-6393‡, 44-83512, **44-83514**, 44-83525, 44-83542, **44-83546**, 44-83559, 44-83563, 44-83624, 44-83663, 44-83684, 44-83690, 44-83718, 44-83735, 44-83785, 44-83790, 44-83814, 44-83863, 44-83868, 44-83884
Vega Burbank (VE)	2,750	15	**44-8543**, 44-8846‡, 44-8889, 44-85599, 44-85583, 44-85718, 44-85734, 44-85738, **44-85740**, 44-85778, **44-85784**, 44-85790, 44-85813, 44-85828, **44-85829**
**Total**	**12,731**	**45**	

The surviving aircraft include examples of four B-17 variants: one B-17D, four B-17Es, and three B-17Fs, with the rest delivered as B-17G. Some B-17G survivors have been modified to represent B-17Fs, such as for filming of the 1990 movie Memphis Belle. B-17G 44-8543 has been modified, including having its chin turret removed, to more closely resemble the B-17F that it wears the livery of ("Ye Olde Pub").

=== List ===
The aircraft are listed in ascending order by their serial numbers, which do not necessarily reflect the order in which they were delivered. Serial numbers are linked to the specific aircraft's article, when available. The location column sorts by country, then by state for aircraft in the United States.

Airworthy
Used in combat

Serial	Location	Institution	Status	History	Photo
40-3097	(United States) Dayton, Ohio	National Museum of the United States Air Force	Under restoration for display	1940: built at Boeing Seattle as a B-17D. May 1941: sent to Hawaii. September 1941: moved to the Philippines, where she was known as "**Ole Betsy**." December 1941–January 1942: used in combat. January 1942: sent to Australia for repairs and given the name "**The Swoose**." Subsequently, used as a transport plane for George Brett and others. After the war, sent to Kingman, Arizona, for scrapping. April 1946: Frank Kurtz recovered the plane, flying her to Los Angeles. 1949: donated to National Air Museum in Washington. Stored outside at Andrews AFB until 1961. Moved indoors in mid-1970s. July 2008: sent to Dayton. Restoration work was suspended in order to complete work on 41-24485 "Memphis Belle."	
41-2446	(United States) Ford Island, Hawaii	Pacific Aviation Museum	Under restoration for display	Built at Boeing Seattle as a B-17E. Delivered to USAAF 6 December 1941. Armament installed at Sacramento Air Depot. Flown to Hawaii 17 December. Attached to USN as search plane. Joined USAAF 19th Bombardment Group in Australia 20 February 1942. During 22 February raid on Simpson Harbor, ditched after attack due to fuel shortage. All crew members survived. Wreck discovered in 1972 by RAAF helicopter pilot. Featured in March 1992 issue of National Geographic. Acquired the nickname "**Swamp Ghost**." Recovered in May 2006. Wreckage impounded at Lae. Shipped in January 2010 to Long Beach. Transferred to Hawaii in 2013.	
41-2595	(United States) Marengo, Illinois	Private (Michael W. Kellner)	Under restoration to airworthiness	Built at Boeing Seattle as a B-17E, delivered on 14 April 1942. Nickname "**Desert Rat**" believed to date from 1942. Converted to an XC-108A cargo plane as of March 1944. Last operated by the military in December 1945. Discovered in a Maine scrapyard in 1985. Moved to Illinois in 1995, where it is being restored.	
41-9032	(United States) New Orleans, Louisiana	National World War II Museum	Static display	Built at Boeing Seattle as a B-17E. Assigned to 342d Bombardment Squadron, 97th Bombardment Group, and named "**My Gal Sal**." During a ferry flight on 27 June 1942, crash-landed in Greenland. All crew members survived and were rescued ten days later. Wreck discovered in 1964. Salvaged in the 1990s by Gary Larkins and stored at Tillamook Air Museum. Purchased by Bob Ready. Restoration began in 2000; later placed on display at Cincinnati-Blue Ash Airport. In 2013, transported to National World War II Museum for display.	
41-9210	(United States) Everett, Washington	Flying Heritage Collection	In storage; registered with FAA	Built at Boeing Seattle as a B-17E. Sold immediately after production on the civilian market in 1943 to a Canadian airline. Sold to a Bolivian airline, crashed. Restored to airworthiness in 1976. Brought back to U.S. in 1990. In the Seattle area since 1998. Undergoing restoration, "about 80 percent complete", as of July 2021.	
41-24485	(United States) Dayton, Ohio	National Museum of the United States Air Force	Static display	Built at Boeing Seattle as a B-17F. Taken on strength 15 July 1942. Deployed to RAF Bassingbourn 14 October. Named "**Memphis Belle**" after Captain Robert K. Morgan's girlfriend Margaret Polk, a resident of Memphis, Tennessee. Between 7 November 1942 and 19 May 1943 flew 25 combat missions with the 324th Bombardment Squadron, 91st Bombardment Group. Returned to U.S. on 8 June and flew 31-city War Bond tour. Purchased by City of Memphis by the efforts of Mayor Walter Chandler. Stored until 1949 when she was placed on display at armoury. Donated to USAF in early 1970s and moved to Mud Island in 1987. In 2003, moved to restoration at Naval Air Station Memphis. Moved to Dayton in October 2005, and subsequently underwent full restoration. Appears as it did in late May 1943.	
42-3374	(United States) Omaha, Nebraska	Offutt AFB	Static display	Built at Douglas Aircraft in Long Beach. CA as a B-17F. Delivered May 1943, assigned Dyersburg, Tennessee; involved in two forced landings, written off in September 1944. Post-war, transferred to MGM film studio, planned movie not made, placed in storage. Moved to Planes of Fame Air Museum in 1970, moved to Beale AFB circa 1981. Restored circa 1988. Moved to Offutt AFB in 1989, dedication ceremony 17 August 1990. Wears livery of 42-30230 "**Homesick Angel**" of 388th Bombardment Group.	
42-29782	(United States) Seattle, Washington	Museum of Flight	Static display; registered with FAA	Built at Boeing Seattle as a B-17F. Modified in Wyoming and subsequently used by training units at Blythe Field and McClellan Field. On 5 November 1945, shipped to Altus, Oklahoma for disposal, but withdrawn in 1946 and shipped to Stuttgart, Arkansas, for display. Used 1968–1985 as water bomber and air tanker. Acquired in 1988 by Museum of Flight, used in making of 1990 Memphis Belle movie. Restored 1991–1998 by Boeing and given the name "**Boeing Bee**." Potentially airworthy but not flown since 1998.	
42-32076	(United States) Chantilly, Virginia	Steven F. Udvar-Hazy Center	In storage	Built at Boeing Seattle as a B-17G. Sent to RAF Bassingbourn in March 1944. Named "**Shoo Shoo Shoo Baby**." Flew 24 combat missions between 24 March and 29 May for the 401st Bombardment Squadron, 91st Bombardment Group. On final mission, force landed in Sweden, crew members interned. Found abandoned in France in 1968. Donated to U.S. by French government, sent to Dover AFB for restoration. After ten-year restoration, flown to Dayton in 1988. Placed in storage in 2018 and transferred to National Air and Space Museum's Steven F. Udvar-Hazy Center. As of 2024, it is on display and awaiting its reassembly.	
43-38635	(United States) Atwater, California	Castle Air Museum	Static display	Built at Boeing Seattle as B-17G. Delivered August 1944, USAAF research work until 1959. Entered private use, converted to airtanker in 1960, used until 1979, then to Castle Air Museum. Wears livery of 42-3352 "**Virgin's Delight**" of 410th Bombardment Squadron, 94th Bombardment Group, which was shot down over North Sea on 29 November 1943.	
44-6393	(United States) Riverside, California	March Field Air Museum	Static display	Built at Douglas Aircraft in Long Beach, CA as a B-17G. Delivered July 1944, assigned in August to 97th Bombardment Group at Amendola Airfield, Italy. Became command aircraft of Lt Gen Ira C. Eaker, replacing his earlier B-17E, and was named "**Starduster**". Reconfigured and used by Eaker until his 1947 retirement, then VIP transport until 1956. Transferred to government of Bolivia in June 1956, used as cargo transport until 1980. Acquired by USAF in January 1981, restored to 1944 configuration.	
44-8543	(United States) Madras, Oregon	Erickson Aircraft Collection	Airworthy; registered with FAA	Built at Lockheed/Vega in Burbank, CA as a B-17G-70-VE. Outfitted with AN/APS-15, later modified to TB-17G (training). Retired as surplus in 1959. Purchased by Erickson in 2013 and named "Madras Maiden," formerly "Chuckie." In 2019, repainted and now wears the livery 42-3167 "**Ye Olde Pub**" of the Brown–Stigler incident. As Brown's plane was a B-17F, the chin turret was removed and the tail was modified to more closely resemble an F model.	
44-8846	(France) Cerny, Essonne	Forteresse toujours volante	Static display	Built at Lockheed/Vega in Burbank, CA as a B-17G. Outfitted with AN/APS-15 radar in place of standard ball turret. Flown to RAF Polebrook and assigned to 511th Bombardment Squadron, 351st Bombardment Group, in March 1945. Flown on six missions. Sold in 1954 to Institut géographique national and used until 1985. Purchased by association Forteresse toujours volante in 1988. Wears livery of 44-8846 "**Pink Lady**". Used in 1989 filming of Memphis Belle. In 2010, transported to Musée Volant Salis, La Ferté-Alais aerodrome, for display. Classified as a monument historique since 2012.	
44-8889	(France) Dugny, Seine-Saint-Denis	Musée de l'air et de l'espace	In storage	Built at Lockheed/Vega Burbank, CA as a B-17G. Assigned to 8th AF but kept in storage. Sold in 1954 to Institut géographique national. Civil registration F-BGSO. Retired to museum in 1976.	
44-83512	(United States) San Antonio, Texas	USAF Airman Heritage Museum	Static display	Built at Douglas Aircraft in Long Beach, CA as a B-17G-105-DL. Delivered May 1945; various domestic postings, retired from military use in 1950. Circa 1972, was on display at Lackland AFB wearing markings of 42-97503 "Princess Pat", but with its own tail number (as later done by 44-83872 "Texas Raiders"). Displayed as 42-97328 "**Heaven's Above**" of the 388th Bombardment Group, but with its own tail number.	
44-83514	(United States) Mesa, Arizona	Commemorative Air Force	Airworthy; registered with FAA	Built at Douglas Aircraft in Long Beach, CA as a B-17G. Purchased in 1959 by Aero Union Corporation of Chico, California. Used as a water bomber until 1978. Donated to Arizona Wing of CAF in 1978. Following a competition, given the name "**Sentimental Journey**." Used in Steven Spielberg WW2 comedy film 1941 (1979). Restored to wartime configuration in the early 1980s.	
44-83525	(United States) Polk City, Florida	Fantasy of Flight	In storage; registered with FAA	Built at Douglas Aircraft in Long Beach, CA as a B-17G. Converted to DB-17G in 1950. Struck off 1959. Purchased by Flying Tiger Air Museum in 1972. She was used in the 1977 film MacArthur and painted to represent 41-2489 "**Suzy Q**" of the 93d Bombardment Squadron, 19th Bombardment Group. Purchased by Kermit Weekes in 1983 and restored to airworthy status. During Hurricane Andrew in August 1992, the plane was thrown from its hangar and severely damaged. Since that time it has been dismantled and held in storage.	
44-83542	(United States) Polk City, Florida	Fantasy of Flight	Static display	Built at Douglas Aircraft in Long Beach, CA as a B-17G. Delivered April 1945, stored until May 1950. Converted to DB-17G and later DB-17P (drone); assigned Kwajalein Atoll, Marshall Islands, and U.S. locations; placed in storage December 1958. Sold in 1959, converted to airtanker in October 1961 and used by Western Air Industries, then Aero Union Corp from 1962 to 1971. Crashed near Benson, Arizona, on 12 July 1971, both crew survived. NTSB report cites partial power loss due to air intake issue. Kept in Tucson as wreckage, (Note: Some parts from 44-83542 were used during restoration of 44-83514 "Sentimental Journey" and 42-32076 "Shoo Shoo Shoo Baby".) moved to California in 1987, acquired by Fantasy of Flight in 1996. Restored and on static display (walk-through) presented as 42-37994 "**Piccadilly Princess**." (Note: Online photos taken at Fantasy of Flight show 44-83542 displayed as 42-37994 with squadron code BG call sign L tail Square-B, which is livery of the 334th Bombardment Squadron of the 95th Bombardment Group. Records indicate 42-37994 was not assigned as such; never left U.S. The noted markings were used by 42-37894 "Pegasus IV.")	
44-83546	(United States) Anaheim, California	Military Aircraft Restoration Corp.	Airworthy; registered with FAA	Built at Douglas Aircraft in Long Beach, CA as a B-17G-85-DL. Put in storage at end of the war. In 1948 was redesignated as a staff transport plane and used in Germany, and in Korea during the Korean War. Struck off in 1954. Converted to a water bomber in 1960. Restored in 1982 by Military Aircraft Restoration Corporation as a B-17F with the livery of 41-24485 "**Memphis Belle**". Currently undergoing deep maintenance.	
44-83559	(United States) Ashland, Nebraska	Strategic Air and Space Museum	Static display	Built at Douglas Aircraft in Long Beach, CA as a B-17G. Taken on strength 5 April 1945. Declared excess in October. Modified to drone in March 1950. Used as drone until May 1958. Issued as museum piece. Flown to museum in May 1959. Formerly wore livery of 42-3474 "King Bee."	
44-83563	(United States) Santa Ana, California	Lyon Air Museum	Static display; registered with FAA	Built at Douglas Aircraft in Long Beach, CA as a B-17G-85-DL. Taken on strength 7 April 1945. Used as transport plane in Philippines. Returned to U.S. in 1952, overhauled, and sent to Japan with 6000th Base Service Group. Returned to U.S. in 1955 and stricken off that June. Sold in August 1959 to American Compressed Steel. Used in the film The War Lover. Flown to Hawaii in 1969 and used in the film Tora! Tora! Tora! Sold to Globe Air in 1981 and used as air tanker. Sold in 2006 to Martin Aviation. Wears livery of 42-97400 "**Fuddy Duddy**". Potentially airworthy but last flown in 2014.	
44-83624	(United States) Dover, Delaware	Air Mobility Command Museum	Static display	Built at Douglas Aircraft in Long Beach, CA as a B-17G-90-DL. Sent to Patterson Field in April 1945. The last B-17 assigned to 532nd BS/381st BG at Ridgewell. Declared excess October 1945, but returned to service in November. Later converted to a DB-17P and used until June 1957. Displayed at National Museum of the US Air Force as "Piccadilly Lilly" before transfer to AMC Museum. Currently wears the nose art and markings of 42-107112 "**Sleepy Time Gal**," which was part of the 381st Bombardment Group, although the real "Sleepy Time Gal" was an unpainted aluminium plane.	
44-83663	(United States) Roy, Utah	Hill Aerospace Museum	Static display	Built at Douglas Aircraft in Long Beach, CA as a B-17G. Delivered May 1945, domestic use, placed in storage at Pyote Field, Texas, in April 1950. At some point converted to TB-17G (training). Transferred to Brazilian Air Force in 1953, registration B17-5400, retired 1968. Displayed at Yesterdays Air Force (Florida) and Combat Air Museum (Kansas). Acquired in 1987 for move to Hill AFB, via a C-5 Galaxy. Exterior restoration completed in 1991. Wears livery of "**Short Bier**" of the 493d Bombardment Group.	
44-83684	(United States) Chino, California	Planes of Fame Air Museum	Under restoration to airworthiness; registered with FAA	Built at Douglas Aircraft in Long Beach, CA as a B-17G. Retired from military service in August 1959 as the last B-17 to serve with USAAF/USAF. Later used in various television shows and movies, such as The Thousand Plane Raid in 1969, and became known as "Piccadilly Lilly II." Grounded and on display since 1971. Restoration effort began circa 2008.	
44-83690	(United States) Warner Robins, Georgia	Museum of Aviation	Under restoration for display	Built at Douglas Aircraft in Long Beach, CA as a B-17G. Assigned to USAF Museum in 1961. Displayed at Grissom Air Museum first as "**Flak Jacket**," then as 44-8385 "**Tarnished Angel**," and finally as 42-31255 "**Miss Liberty Belle**." Added to the National Register of Historic Places in 1993. Sent to Museum of Aviation in 2015.	
44-83718	(Brazil) Rio de Janeiro	Museu Aeroespacial	In storage	Built at Douglas Aircraft in Long Beach, CA as a B-17G. Converted to TB-17H (training) then SB-17G (rescue). Served with 1061st Rescue Flight in Libya during 1948–1949, then returned to Hamilton AFB in 1950. Transferred to Brazilian Air Force, registration B17-5408, in use 1955 to 1968. Displayed in Brazil at Natal AFB 1970 to 1980. Dismantled and in storage.	
44-83735	(United Kingdom) Duxford, Cambridgeshire	Imperial War Museum Duxford	Static display	Built at Douglas Aircraft in Long Beach, CA as a B-17G. Delivered late May 1945, placed in storage, dropped from inventory in November. Sold for $13,750 in 1947 to Transocean Air Lines, sold to Assemblies of God USA in 1949, sold to a private party in 1951, sold to IGN of France in December 1952. Stopped flying in 1972, offered for sale without engines in 1973, purchased by Euroworld Ltd in May 1975 and sent to Duxford. Purchased by Imperial War Museum in January 1978, returned to a wartime configuration. Wore livery of 42-31983 "Mary Alice" with 401st Bombardment Group. Conservation project in 2012 supported by 96th Bombardment Group, repainted as generic 96th BG with tail number 42-38133. (Note: Both 44-83735 at Duxford (UK) and 44-85599 at Dyess (US) are displayed using s/n 42-38133; the Duxford plane has generic 96th BG markings, while the Dyess plane wears the full livery of "Reluctant Dragon".)	
44-83785	(United States) New Smyrna Beach, Florida	Collings Foundation	long-term maintenance back to airworthy; registered with FAA	Built at Douglas Aircraft in Long Beach, CA as a B-17G-95-DL; possibly delivered as 44-85531 (Vega Burbank) with serial number later changed. Used by CIA, later with Intermountain Aviation and outfitted with Fulton Skyhook; appeared at end of James Bond Thunderball. Acquired by Evergreen Aviation & Space Museum in mid-1980s, put on static display. Nicknamed "Shady Lady". Purchased by Collings Foundation in 2015. Undergoing maintenance work in Florida to return to flightworthy.	
44-83790	(United States) Douglas, Georgia	Private (Don Brooks)	Under restoration for display	Built at Douglas Aircraft in Long Beach, CA as a B-17G. Crash landed on frozen Dyke Lake, Newfoundland and Labrador on 24 December 1947. Recovered in 2004 following legal action to secure salvage rights. Under restoration at Brooks Aviation.	
44-83814	(United States) Pooler, Georgia	Mighty Eighth Air Force Museum	Static display	Built at Douglas Aircraft in Long Beach, CA as a B-17G. Sold in 1951 to California Atlantic Airways. Spent most of 1950s and 1960s in Toronto as a photographic survey plane. Returned to United States in 1969 where she was restored at Spearfish, South Dakota using fuselage and wings of 41-2451 and nose and tail from 44 to 83812. After being displayed in various locations, transferred in 1984 to Smithsonian. Loaned in 2009 to Mighty Eighth Museum and given the name "**City of Savannah**."	
44-83863	(United States) Valparaiso, Florida	Air Force Armament Museum	Static display	Built at Douglas Aircraft in Long Beach, CA in July 1945 as a B-17G, transferred to the Navy that month, sold in December 1957 for use as a forest fire tanker, acquired for museum display in 1976. Displayed with 96th Bombardment Group livery.	
44-83868	(United Kingdom) London	Royal Air Force Museum London	Static display	Built at Douglas Aircraft in Long Beach, CA as a B-17G. Taken on strength 6 July 1945. Transferred to USN 14 July. Sent to NAS Johnsville for conversion. Struck off 10 July 1956. Sold to American Pressed Steel Corporation in December 1957. Changed hands multiple times after this. Traded to TBM Inc. in 1982 and restored to WW2 configuration with marking of 332d Bombardment Squadron, 94th Bombardment Group. Donated to RAF Museum by USAF.	
44-83884	(United States) Bossier City, Louisiana	Barksdale Global Power Museum	Static display	Built at Douglas Aircraft in Long Beach, CA as a B-17G. Penultimate Douglas B-17. Navy use as PB-1W from 1945 to 1956. Into private use, airtanker from 1961 to 1979. To Barksdale AFB in 1980. First displayed as "Yankee Doodle II", now wears livery of 42-31340 "**Miss Liberty**".	
44-85599	(United States) Abilene, Texas	Dyess AFB	Static display	Built at Lockheed/Vega in Burbank, CA as a B-17G. Moved to Dyess AFB in 1974 for display. Wears livery of 42-38133 "**Reluctant Dragon**" of the 337th Bombardment Squadron, 96th Bombardment Group.	
44-85583	(Brazil) Recife, Pernambuco	Recife Air Force Base	Static display	Built at Lockheed/Vega in Burbank, CA as a B-17G, delivered March 1945. Converted to TB-17H (training) then SB-17G (rescue). Transferred to Brazilian Air Force in 1951, registration B17-5402, retired 1968. Placed on display in 1973 and restored in 1999.	
44-85718	(United States) Mount Pleasant, Texas (Note: 44-85718 is undergoing long-term maintenance work in Madras, Oregon.)	Mid America Flight Museum	long-term maintenance back to airworthy; registered with FAA	Built at Lockheed/Vega in Burbank, CA as a B-17G-95-DL. Delivered the day after VE Day. Registered in France in 1947 and in England in 1984. Returned to United States circa 1987. Wears livery of 42-38050 "**Thunderbird**". Currently undergoing "extensive rebuild" in Oregon by the Erickson Aircraft Collection.	
44-85734	(United States) Douglas, Georgia	The Liberty Foundation	Under restoration to airworthiness; registered with FAA	Built at Lockheed/Vega in Burbank, CA as a B-17G-105-VE. Restored in livery of 42-97849 "**Liberty Belle**" of the 570th Bombardment Squadron, 390th Bombardment Group. On 13 June 2011 made a forced landing at Oswego, Illinois, and was largely destroyed in fire. NTSB investigation found inadequate repair of a fuel tank. Shipped to Brooks Aviation in Douglas, Georgia, to be rebuilt – as of January 2022, fuselage work in progress with much of the aft section being new structure.	
44-85738	(United States) Tulare, California	Mefford Field	Static display	Built at Lockheed/Vega in Burbank, CA as a B-17G. Given to AMVETS Chapter 56 in 1958. Moved to compound at Perry's Coffee House in 1971. Placed on display at AMVETS again in 1981. Named "**Preston's Pride**."	
44-85740	(United States) Oshkosh, Wisconsin (Note: 44-85740 is undergoing long-term maintenance in Punta Gorda, Florida.)	Experimental Aircraft Association	Airworthy; registered with FAA	Built at Lockheed/Vega in Burbank, CA as a B-17G-105-VE. Delivered May 1945, placed into storage, de-militarized in November. Entered private use in 1946. First restoration work circa 1978. Wears livery of 42-102516 "**Aluminum Overcast**." In 2021, underwent wing spar attachment repairs in Florida. Currently at EAA Headquarters in Oshkosh, Wisconsin, undergoing reassembly.	
44-85778	(United States) Palm Springs, California	Palm Springs Air Museum	Static display; registered with FAA	Built at Lockheed/Vega in Burbank, CA as a B-17G-105-VE. Delivered to Dallas in June 1945. Used as TB-17G crew trainer for Caribbean Air Command, later converted to VB-17G (staff transport) for use at U.S. Brazilian Command in 1948. To Bolling Field in 1954, then into storage at Davis-Monthan AFB in 1956. Private ownership 1959 to 1990; in storage 1984 to 1990. Restored 1991 and flown as "Miss Museum Of Flying". To Palm Springs Air Museum in 1993, named "**Miss Angela**." Potentially airworthy but not known to have flown since 2004.	
44-85784	(United Kingdom) Duxford, Cambridgeshire	Imperial War Museum Duxford	Airworthy; registered with CAA	Built at Lockheed/Vega in Burbank, CA as a B-17G-105-VE. Placed in storage after delivery. Sent to Wright Field in 1948. Leased to General Electric in 1950. Sold in 1954 to Institut géographique national, and used until 1975 as survey plane. Purchased in 1975 by Ted White, restored to WW2 configuration and named "**Sally B**" after his partner, Elly Sallingboe. Used in 1989 filming of Memphis Belle. Still wears livery of 41-24485 "**Memphis Belle**" on one side.	
44-85790	(United States) Salem, Oregon	B-17 Alliance Museum	Under restoration to airworthiness	Built at Lockheed/Vega in Burbank, CA as a B-17G-105-VE. Flown to Rome 14 July 1945. Purchased by Art Lacey of Portland, Oregon, 5 March 1947. Used in Milwaukie, Oregon, as gas station canopy, later to advertise Bomber Restaurant, until 2014. Under restoration to airworthy status. Named "**Lacey Lady**."	
44-85813	(United States) Urbana, Ohio	Champaign Aviation Museum	Under restoration to airworthiness; registered with FAA	Built at Lockheed/Vega in Burbank, CA as a B-17G-110-VE. Converted to a JB-17G testbed variant by Curtiss Wright. Sold to Curtiss in 1957. Later used as an airtanker; crashed 25 April 1980 during takeoff in Brunswick County, North Carolina. Recovered and placed in storage, acquired by Champaign Aviation Museum in 2005 for restoration to flying condition. Named "**Champaign Lady**."	
44-85828	(United States) Tucson, Arizona	390th Memorial Museum / Pima Air & Space Museum	Static display	Built at Lockheed/Vega in Burbank, CA as a B-17G. Placed in storage. Later transferred to U.S. Coast Guard as patrol and rescue plane. From 1978 to 1980 served as a water bomber for Globe Aviation in Mesa, Arizona. Transferred in U.S.A.F Museum in 1980. Wears livery of 42-31892 "**I'll Be Around**."	
44-85829	United States	Private (undisclosed)	Airworthy; registered with FAA	Built at Lockheed/Vega in Burbank, CA as a B-17G-110-VE. Restored in generic livery of 534th Bombardment Squadron, 381st Bombardment Group. Nicknamed "**Yankee Lady**." Michigan Flight Museum (Note: Michigan Flight Museum was formerly known as Yankee Air Museum.) announced the sale of this B-17 in June 2024, however, the new owner was not announced at that time.	

== Related aircraft ==
=== Known wrecks ===
In addition to the 45 surviving planes, there are several known complete or near-complete wrecks around the world. The most recent wreck to be recovered (Swamp Ghost) was removed from a swamp in Papua New Guinea in 2006. There are currently no plans underway to recover any wrecks.

Serial	Location	Coordinates	History	Photo
41-2420	Solomon Islands	9.273986°S 159.775272°E	Built at Boeing Seattle as a B-17E. Named "Bessie the Jap Basher." Ditched near Aruliho after attacking a Japanese shipping convoy near Bougainville on 24 September 1942.	
41-9234	Papua New Guinea	7.3675°S 146.8042°E	Built at Boeing Seattle as a B-17E. Crash landed on the side of a mountain near Wau on 8 January 1943 after attacking a convoy in the Huon Gulf. Following the recovery of the "Swamp Ghost," this became the most intact wrecked B-17 still on land.	
41-24371	Italy	38.160690°N 13.436701°E (approx.)	Built at Boeing Seattle as a B-17F. Named "Devils from Hell." Crash landed off coast of Palermo on 18 April 1943.	
41-24521	Papua New Guinea	9.706844°S 150.064408°E (approx.)	Built at Boeing Seattle as a B-17F. Named "Black Jack/The Joker's Wild." Ditched near Cape Vogel during a storm on 11 July 1943. Discovered in 1986.	
42-31044	France	42.572058°N 8.762800°E	Built at Boeing Seattle as a B-17G. Named "Her Did." Ditched off coast of Corsica on 14 February 1944.	
44-6630	Croatia		Built at Douglas Long Beach as a B-17G. Ditched off coast of Vis on 6 November 1944.	

=== Re-build projects ===
These are projects utilizing salvaged B-17 parts or partial B-17s.

- 42-3455 Lucky Thirteen – A project to build an airworthy B-17F, incorporating some parts recovered in France from a September 1943 crash.
- 44-83387 Piccadilly Lily – A surviving B-17G fuselage, used as a prop for the Twelve O'Clock High movie and 12 O'Clock High television series, being rebuilt with elements from other B-17s. Some of this aircraft's fuselage was used to create commemorative luggage tags sold to the public.

== See also ==
- Accidents and incidents involving the Boeing B-17 Flying Fortress
- List of surviving Boeing B-29 Superfortresses; two were airworthy as of 2025
