= Yankee Lady =

Restored World War II-era aircraft

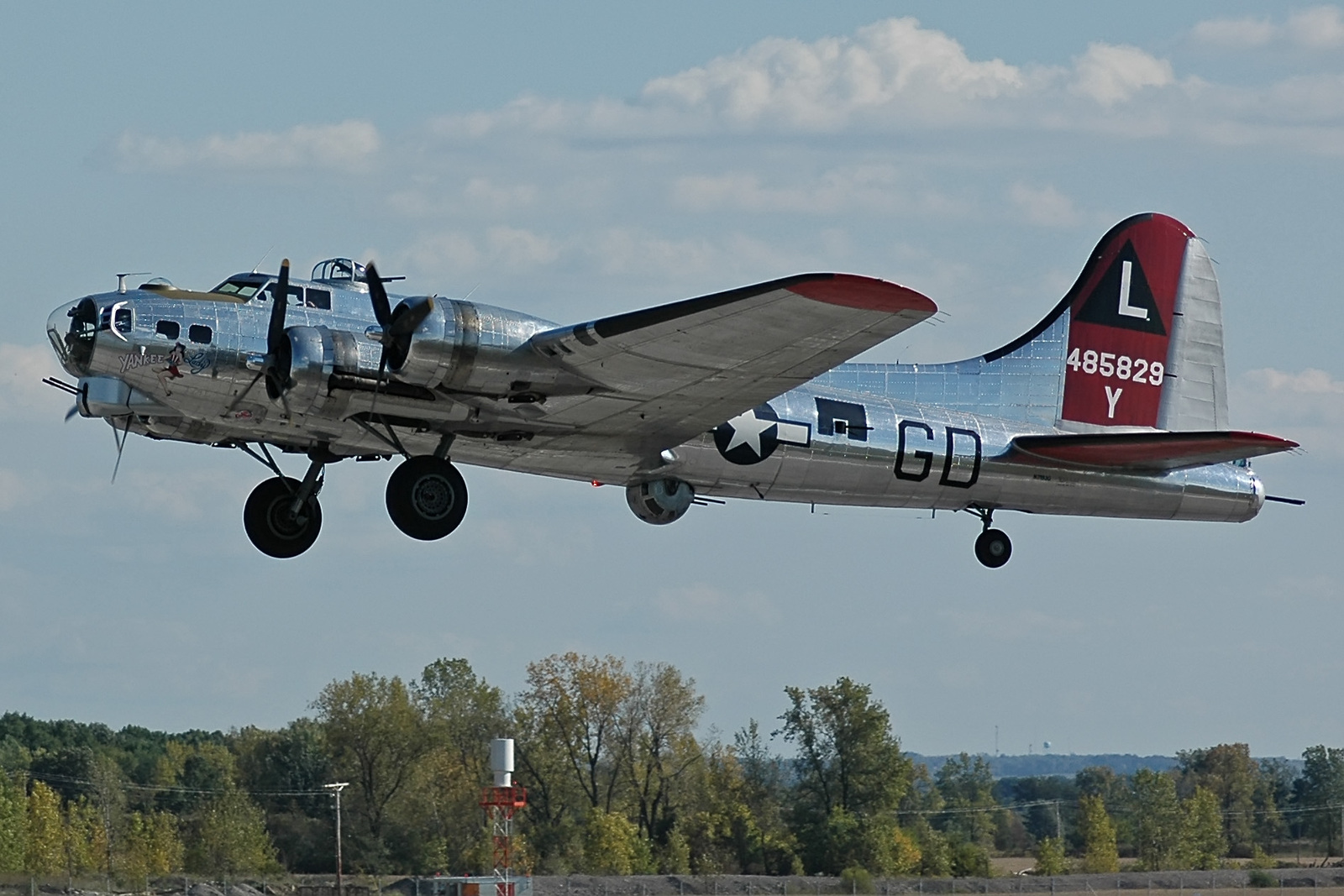
- Yankee Lady in 2007

General information
- Type: Boeing B-17G-110-VE Flying Fortress
- Manufacturer: Vega Aircraft Corporation
- Owners: US Coast Guard (1946–1959); Private (1959–1986); Yankee Air Museum (1986–2024); Private (2024–present)
- Registration: N3193G
- Serial: 44-85829 / BuNo. 77255

History
- Manufactured: July 1945
- Preserved at: Willow Run Airport in Van Buren Township, Michigan
- Fate: Restored to a World War II configuration

Yankee Lady is a Boeing B-17 Flying Fortress owned by a private collector, previously owned by the Yankee Air Museum. Originally delivered to the U.S military in 1945, the plane did not see combat action; it was used by the United States Coast Guard for over a decade. Purchased by the Yankee Air Museum in 1986, it was restored to a World War II configuration and flown for flight experience rides and airshow appearances until it was sold to a private collector in June of 2024. It has since been partially disassembled for further restoration.

== History ==
=== Military use ===
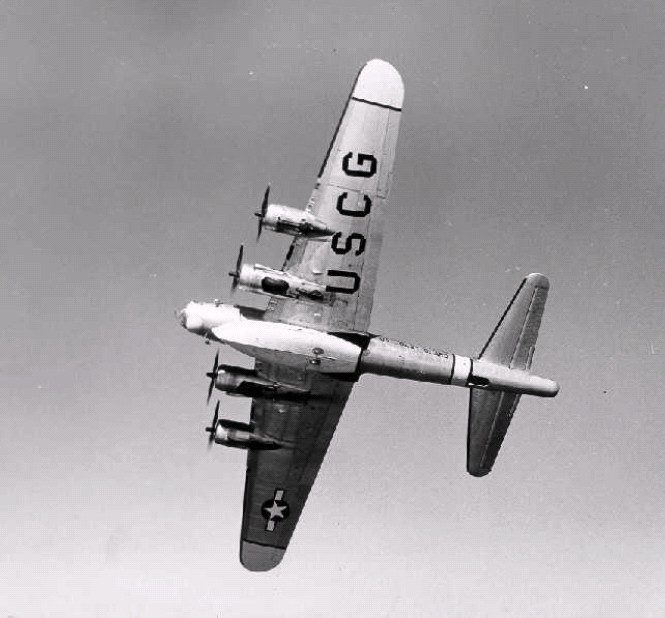
A PB-1G with lifeboat in 1948

The plane is a B-17G-110-VE, bearing United States Army Air Forces (USAAF) serial number 44-85829. The airplane was built by the Vega Division of Lockheed Aircraft Corporation at Burbank, California, and was delivered to the USAAF on July 16, 1945. It went to Dallas, Texas, for modifications and in September 1945 was placed in storage at South Plains Army Air Field near Lubbock, Texas, along with other brand new B-17s. The plane was not deployed for any combat action.

In 1946, the aircraft was one of 16 Flying Fortresses that were transferred to the U.S. Coast Guard. These aircraft were re-designated as PB-1G, with “P” signifying patrol, “B” denoting designed by Boeing, “1” for the first model of the type and “G” for Coast Guard. This particular aircraft was assigned Bureau Number (BuNo) 77255. All of the guns and turrets were removed, and a radar dome was installed in the position formerly occupied by the chin turret. It was used for air-sea rescue and iceberg patrol duties out of Coast Guard Air Station Elizabeth City, North Carolina; Naval Station Argentia, Newfoundland; and Coast Guard Air Station San Francisco, California. At one time, it carried an air droppable, 27-foot-long (8.2 m) 3,300-pound (1,500 kg) wooden lifeboat under the fuselage for rescuing people stranded at sea. The plane was put up for disposal by the Coast Guard in May 1959.

=== Private ownership (1959–1986) ===
On May 11, 1959, the airplane was sold to Ace Smelting, Inc. for $5,887.93. It was assigned civil registration N3193G by the Federal Aviation Administration (FAA). In November 1959, Fairchild Aerial Survey Company purchased the aircraft and used it for aerial survey work. In 1966, the plane was sold to Aircraft Specialties, Inc. of Mesa, Arizona. This company used numerous B-17s as air tankers to fight forest fires and apply pesticides on crops and trees.

During 1969, the aircraft was one of five B-17s flown to Hawaii and used in the filming of the film Tora! Tora! Tora!, released in 1970.

In 1985, the airplane was among four other B-17s that were put up for sale at an auction held by Globe Air, the successor company to Aircraft Specialties.

=== Yankee Air Museum ===
Yankee Air Museum purchased the plane for $250,000 in June 1986. After several test hops, the aircraft was flown from Mesa, Arizona, to Willow Run Airport near Ypsilanti, Michigan, on July 2, 1986. It did not fly again for nine years.

==== Restoration ====
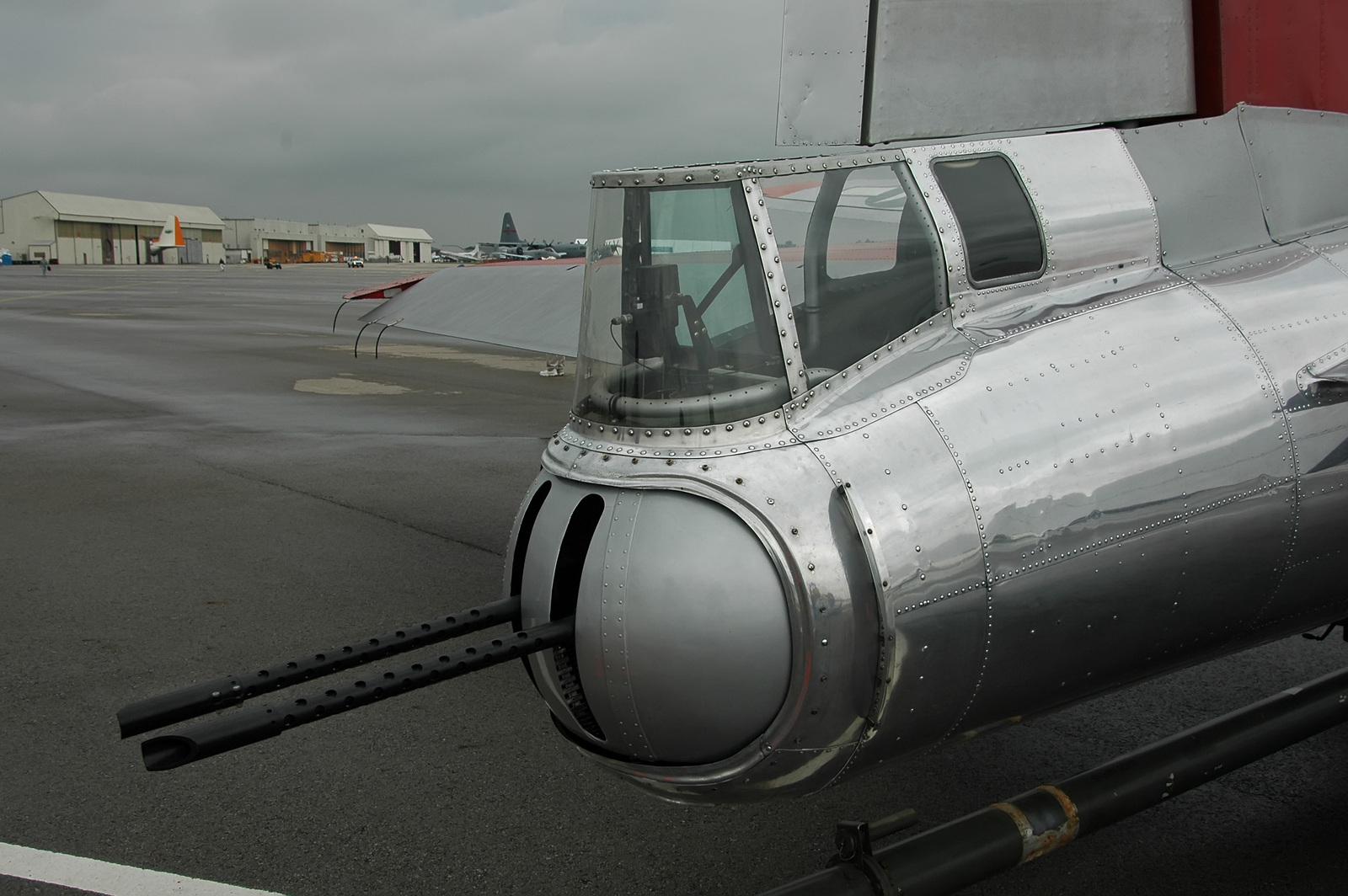
Yankee Lady tail turret

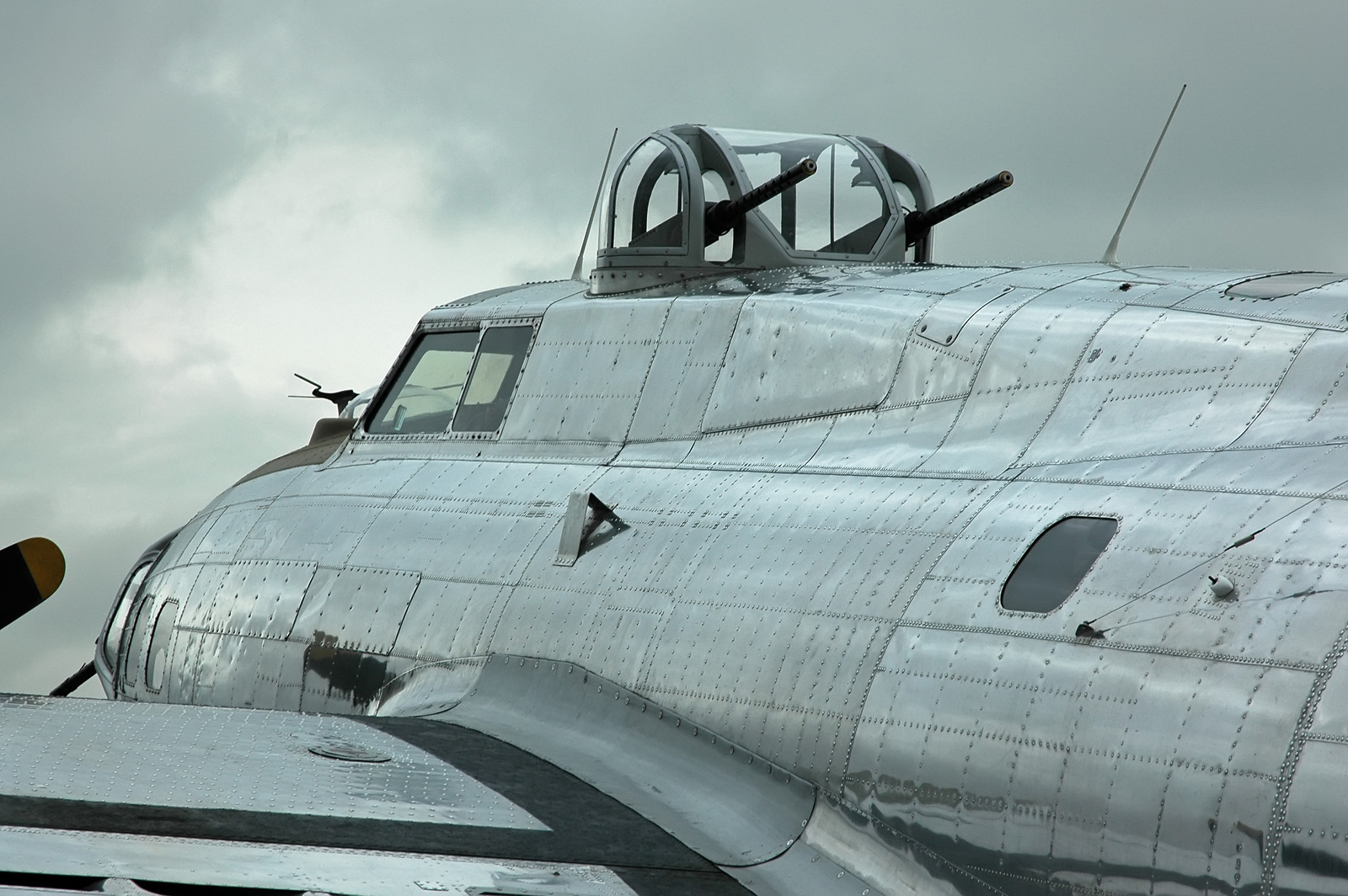
Yankee Lady top turret

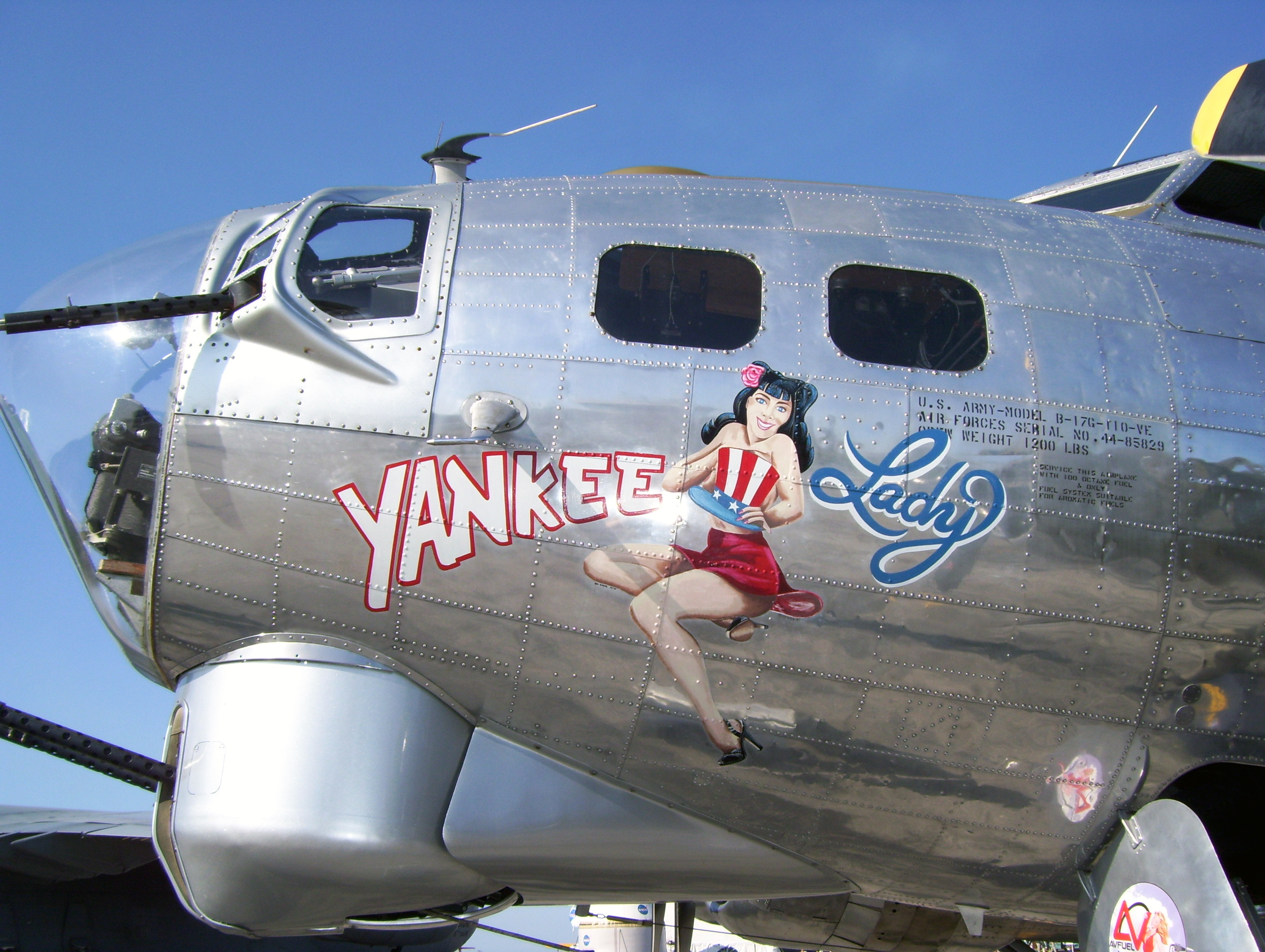
Yankee Lady nose art in 2008

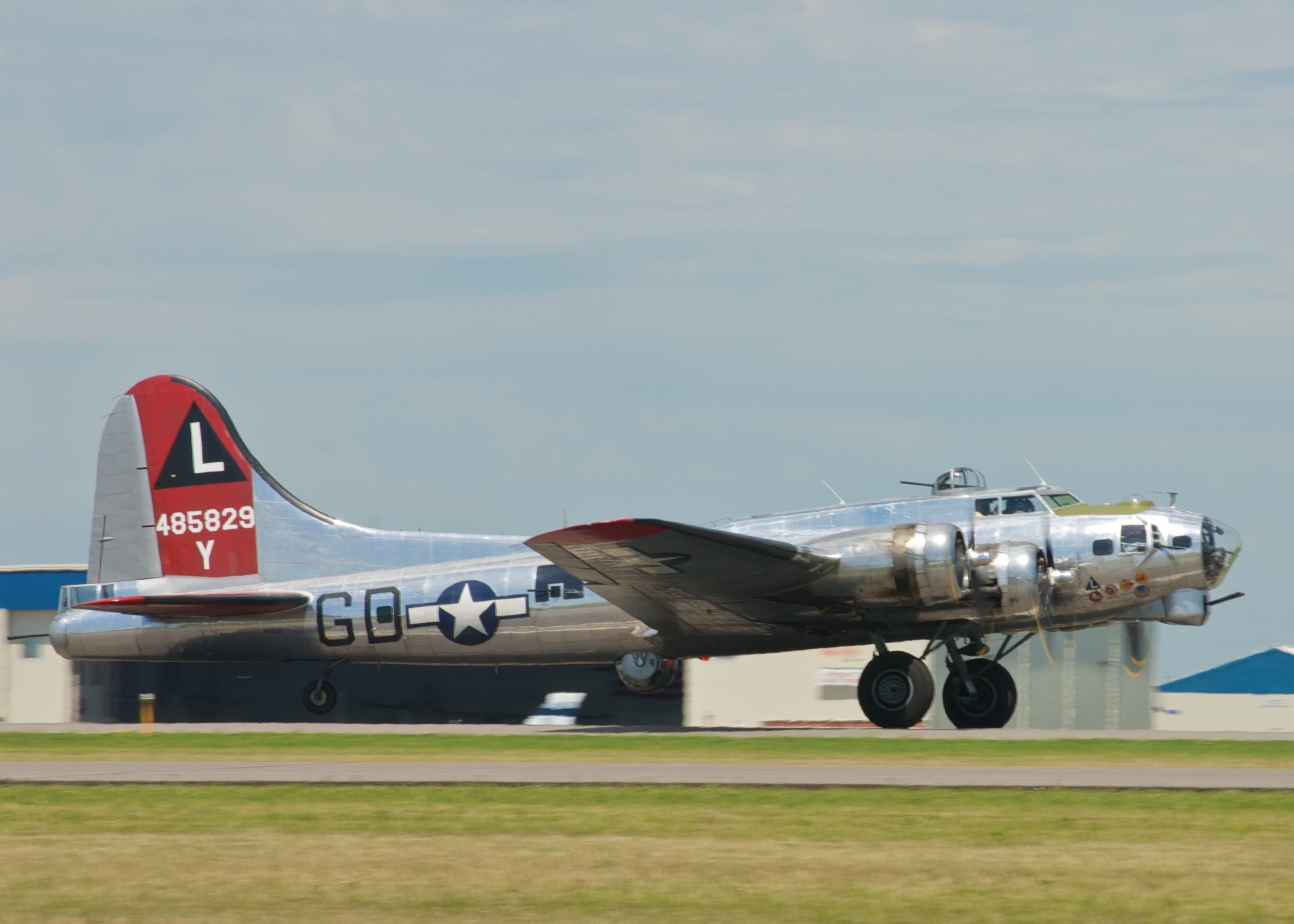
Yankee Lady in 2010

A comprehensive inspection and repair/rebuild program was initiated almost immediately after the B-17 arrived at the museum. The primary goal was to return the aircraft to safe flying condition, with the secondary objective of reinstall as much authentic combat equipment as was obtainable and practical.

Upon close examination, it was found that the plane was quite literally only a shadow of a World War II combat-configured B-17. All turrets and guns were missing. Floors had been lowered and bulkheads removed during its long and varied postwar career. A large cargo door had been installed in the left side of the fuselage.

The vertical and horizontal tail surfaces were removed in order to repair areas of corrosion. All control surfaces were recovered using modern fabric, and the control cables inspected and replaced as necessary. The floor in the radio room was raised to its original position and authentic radios installed along with a table for the radio operator.

The two 1,000-US-gallon (3,800 L) fire retardant tanks were removed, and the bomb bay doors re-installed along with the equipment required to be able to open and close them in flight. Bomb racks were built from scratch. The roof above the bomb bay was removed to repair the structure that had been modified when the chemical tanks were fitted.

The outer wing panels were removed to allow replacement of the aileron attachment channels, which were corroded. The long-range Tokyo auxiliary fuel tanks were removed. All four Wright R-1820-97 nine cylinder turbocharged radial engines were dismounted and the two outboards overhauled at a cost of over $25,000 a piece. Every hose and electrical wire in the airplane has been replaced.

A Sperry ball turret and a Bendix chin turret were acquired, renovated and re-installed in the aircraft. A top turret dome has been fitted along with cheek guns in the nose compartment. A replacement Cheyenne tail turret was obtained and restored to its World War II configuration.

The aircraft has been painted in the markings of a typical B-17G assigned to the 534th Bombardment Squadron (squadron code GD), 381st Bombardment Group (Triangle L), Eighth Air Force flying out of RAF Ridgewell in England in late 1944. The Yankee Lady name and nose art do not replicate that of a known combat veteran B-17, but rather are meant to be representative of the era. The plane's color scheme is a memorial to the late Joseph Slavik who flew 35 missions as a pilot with the 381st. He and his brother Stephen made a significant financial contribution that helped purchase the plane. The restoration work was accomplished almost entirely by volunteers.

==== Post-restoration ====
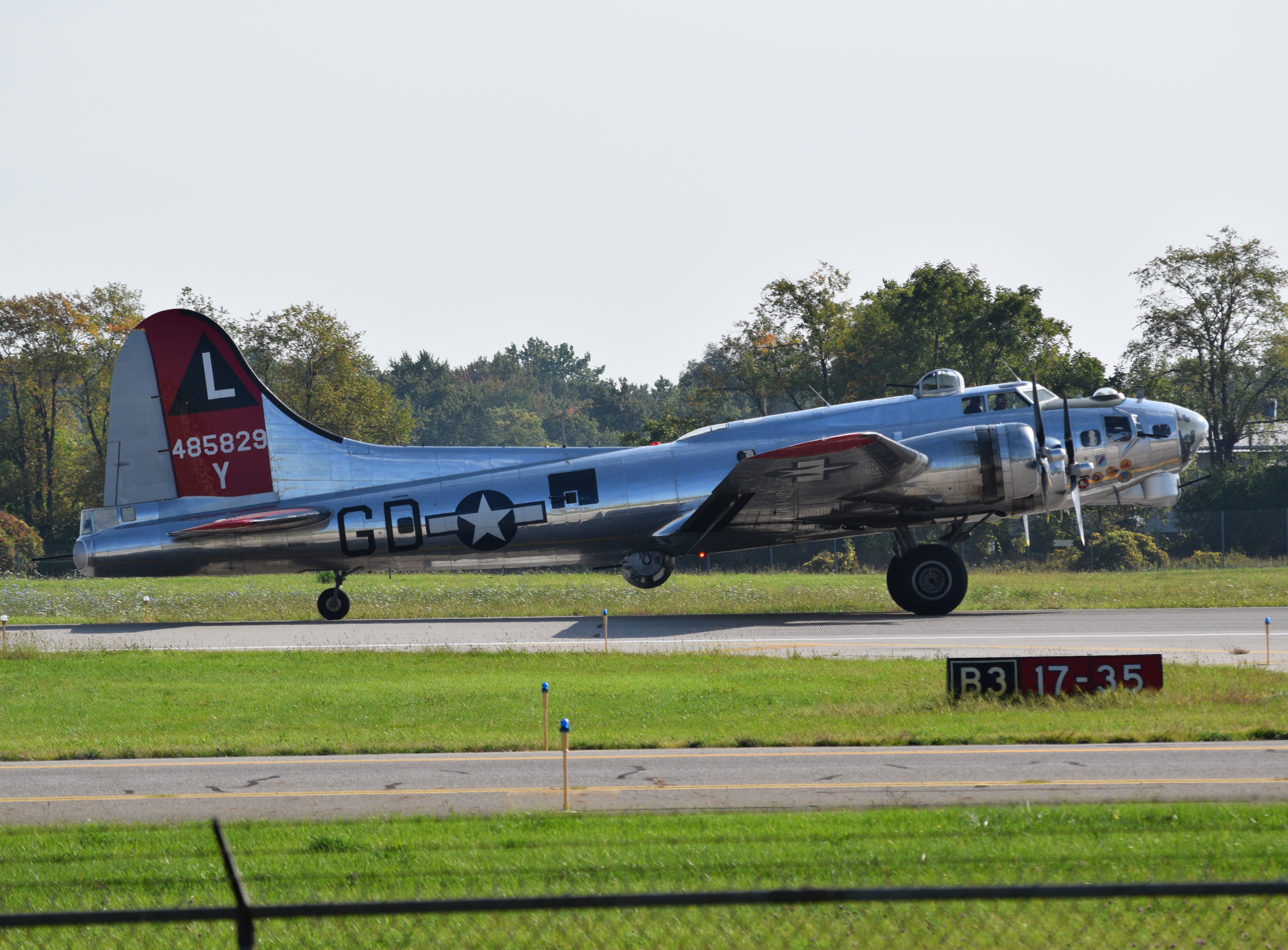
Yankee Lady in 2023

The plane's first post-restoration flight took place on July 13, 1995.

In 2018, Yankee Lady and another operational B-17, Aluminum Overcast, were on hand with re-enactors for the debut of the famous Memphis Belle bomber at the National Museum of the U.S. Air Force. The plane played a role in the 2022 movie Wolf Hound, about a Luftwaffe special operations unit, KG 200, that flew Allied aircraft.

Yankee Lady served as one of several World War II-era planes operated by Yankee Air Museum for flight experience rides open to the public. In April 2023, the museum announced that Yankee Lady would be grounded “out of an abundance of caution” and was not expected to fly for the rest of 2023. By July 3, 2023, Yankee Lady had been found compliant with the airworthiness directive that had grounded the plane earlier in the year, and resumed a regular flying schedule.

=== Private ownership (2024-present) ===
On June 5, 2024, the Michigan Flight Museum (formerly Yankee Air Museum), announced that Yankee Lady had been sold to a private party in the Western US, stating that any future long-term groundings of the aircraft would cause financial hardship on the museum. It was later announced that Charlie Somers of Sacramento, CA was the new owner of the B-17G, Yankee Lady. The plane has since been partially disassembled for further restoration.
