= Solomon Islands Sign Language =

Deaf sign language of the Solomon Islands

- SISL
- Native to: Solomon Islands
- Native speakers: 3,000 (2021)
- Language family: indigenous– Auslan creole? creole of local regional languages?

Language codes
- ISO 639-3: szs
- Glottolog: solo1262 Solomon Islands Sign Language

Solomon Islands Sign Language is the local deaf sign language of the Solomon Islands. There are significant similarities between the sign of the main islands of Guadalcanal and Malaita, and presumably elsewhere. The capital Honiara, where deaf people from all nine provinces have gathered, has the most developed Deaf community, and there is a nearby Deaf village at Aruliho. SISL is all domains of life, with admixture of Signed English and Auslan signs.

There is a relatively high incidence of deafness in the Solomon Islands due to poverty-related diseases such malaria, meningitis, rubella, and otitis media. Attitude towards SISL is very positive, and the community worries that Auslan, which is taught at school, does not reflect their cultural and language needs. This has been confirmed by a pilot linguistic investigation.
