= Vatupilei =

- Village
- Location in Guadalcanal
- Coordinates: 9°16′35″S 159°43′44″E
- Country: Solomon Islands
- Province: Guadalcanal
- Island: Guadalcanal
- Time zone: UTC+11 (UTC)

Vatupilei is a village in Guadalcanal, Solomon Islands. It is located near Aruliho, 33.8 kilometres (21.0 mi) by road northwest of Honiara.
