= Boeing B-17G Flying Fortress No. 44-83690 =

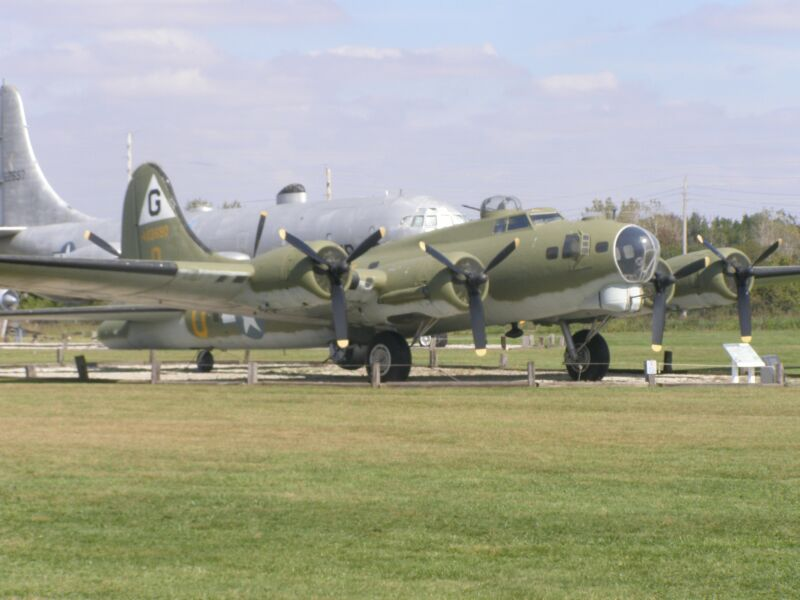
- The aircraft on display at Grissom Air Reserve Base in October 2010

General information
- Type: Boeing B-17G-95-DL Flying Fortress
- Manufacturer: Douglas Aircraft Company
- Serial: 44-83690

History
- Manufactured: 1945
- Preserved at: Museum of Aviation, Robins Air Force Base, Georgia

Boeing B-17G Flying Fortress No. 44-83690 is a B-17 Flying Fortress heavy bomber currently undergoing restoration at the Museum of Aviation near Robins Air Force Base in Georgia. It was built as a B-17G-95-DL by the Douglas Aircraft Company and delivered for use on May 9, 1945. It was flown to Grissom Air Force Base for display as a museum piece in 1961. The plane was listed on the National Register of Historic Places in 1993. It was moved to the Museum of Aviation in August 2015.

The aircraft is a reasonably intact World War II aircraft type of which there are less than 50 surviving examples. It is also an example of an experimental aircraft that participated in military tests shortly after the war.

== History ==
=== Military use ===
The plane, a Boeing B-17G Flying Fortress assigned serial number 44-83690, was delivered on May 9, 1945, to Patterson AFB (Ohio), 4100 Base Unit, and put into storage. On November 14, 1945, it was assigned to Air Material Command, 4168 Base Unit at South Plains Army Air Field in Lubbock, Texas. In June 1947, it was again transferred to Air Material Command, 4141 Base Unit, Pyote Field, Texas.

In July 1950, it was fitted with special equipment and redesignated as a DB-17G (Director B-17G). The conversion was completed at Olmstead Air Force Base, Pennsylvania. Once converted, it was transferred to the 3200 Drone Squadron at Eglin Air Force Base in Florida. In February 1951, the plane was sent to Kwajalein, Enewetak (Marshall Islands) and assigned to the 3200 Proof Test Wing as participation in Operation Greenhouse, a series of nuclear tests for the Atomic Energy Commission.

In May 1951, it was once more transferred, to Patrick Air Force Base in Florida, where it was assigned to the 3205 Drone Group, 3215 Drone Squadron. Enhanced in 1955, the craft was redesignated DB-17 to serve in the 3235th Drone Squadron, Missile Test Center, Patrick AFB from 1956 to 1959. As one of the last active B-17s, it was removed from the Air Force inventory in August 1960.

=== Post-military use ===
- No. 44-83690
- U.S. National Register of Historic Places
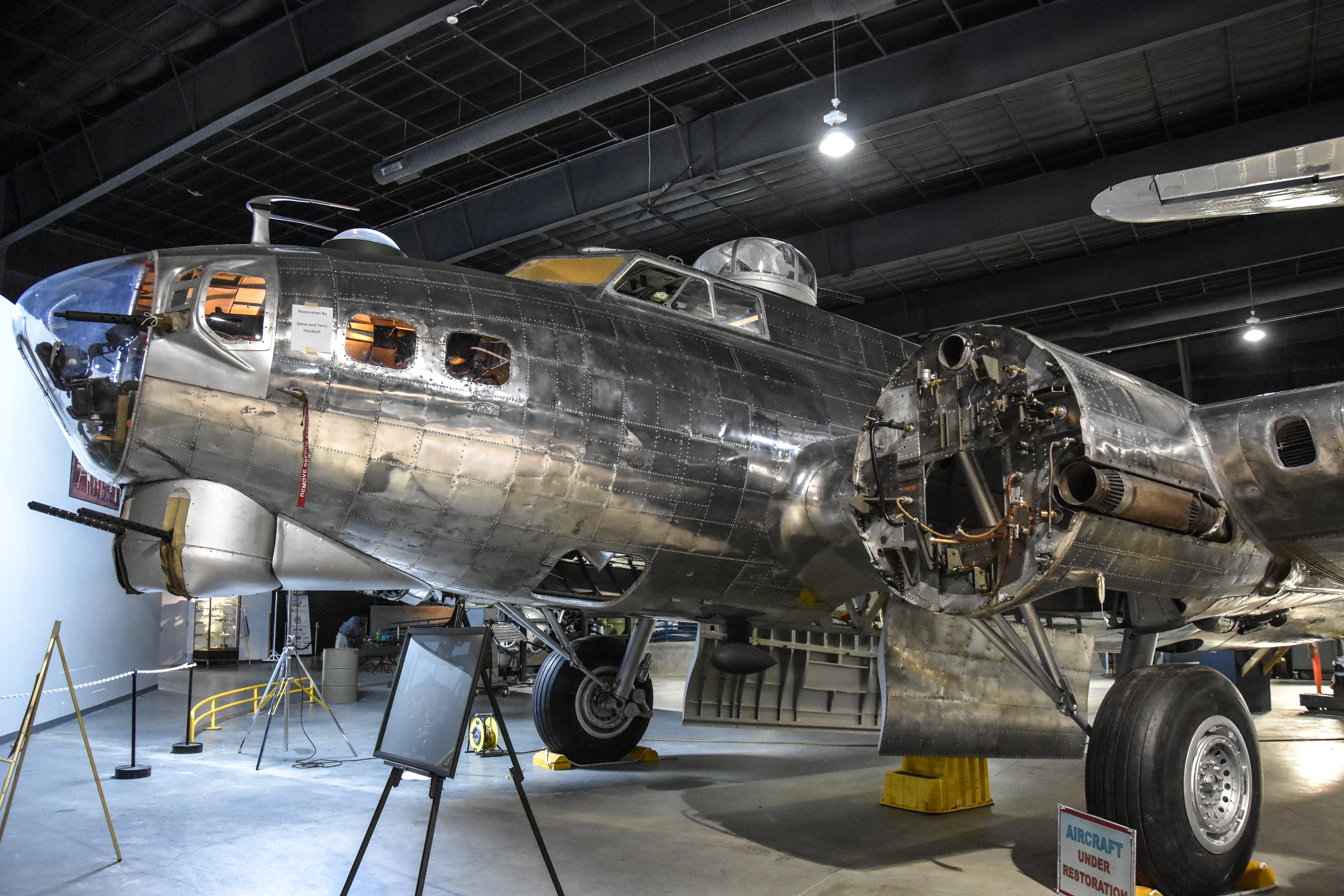
- The plane in February 2020, undergoing restoration
- Nearest city: Warner Robins, Georgia
- Coordinates: 32°35′24″N 83°35′16″W
- NRHP reference No.: 93000540
- Added to NRHP: June 29, 1993

In 1961, the plane was flown to Grissom Air Force Base (then known as Bunker Hill Air Force Base) for permanent display. The Heritage Museum Foundation, established in 1981 as part of the Air Force Museum Program, maintained the plane.

Photos taken in February 1992 and included as part of the National Register of Historic Places (NRHP) submission for the aircraft show it on display at Grissom AFB painted with tail number 42-31255 and nose art depicting "Miss Liberty Belle" on the left side and the wording "Flak Magnet" on the right side. The nose art was added to the plane circa 1983. The plane was added to the NRHP on June 29, 1993.

In 2015, the aircraft was moved in pieces to the Museum of Aviation near Robins Air Force Base in Georgia and began a lengthy restoration effort. As of January 2020, the plane had been largely reassembled with restoration expected to be completed "in the next four years". The $400,000 effort is being completely funded by donations.

== Description ==
B-17G-90-DL 44-83690 is a heavy bomber manufactured by the Douglas Aircraft Company in Long Beach, California. Douglas was one of two companies in addition to Boeing, designated to manufacture B-17s during World War II. General features of the B-17 include its mid-wing monoplane design, aluminum-clad exterior, four radial engines, massive wing structure, and heavy armament.

- Crew of 10, including pilot, co-pilot, bombardier, radio operator, navigator, top turret gunner, two waist gunners, ball turret gunner, and tail gunner.
- Power Plant of the later model G, had General Electric B-22 turbochargers. The engine nacelles, cowlings, and three-blade propellers are intact. Engines were numbered for reference starting with the outer starboard unit from 1-4.
- The wingspan is 103.75 feet (31.62 m). The parabolic-arch-like shape of the wings encompass 1,420 sq. ft. and are characteristic of B-17s.
- B-17Gs are typically 74.33 feet (22.66 m) in length with a raised cockpit section and Plexiglas nose cone. There are numerous small square windows along the port and starboard sides of the nose area and a navigator's blister located dorsal (top) between the cockpit and nose cone. The cockpit has two forward angled windows, two side windows, and two dorsal windows Waist gunner windows are staggered, the port side being just aft of its starboard counterpart to give the gunners more room to maneuver during combat. A hatch is located aft of the starboard waist gunner's port.
- The tail fin, beginning with the E series, is massive. It is 19.17 feet (5.84 m) tall. The stabilizers are of standard T assembly. The tail gunner is located below the fin. All B-17s have a retractable tail-wheel landing gear.
- The B-17G weights 32,720 pounds (14,840 kg) empty. Fully armed and loaded, a B-17 can weigh 65,600 pounds (29,800 kg) Payloads ran between 4,000–5,000 pounds (1,800–2,300 kg), but they could carry up to 17,600 pounds (8,000 kg) for shorter missions.

== Bibliography ==
As listed in the NRHP submission:

- Birdsall, Steven. Famous Aircraft: The B-17 Flying Fortress. New York: ARCO Publishing Co., Inc., 1965. Note: includes partial reprint of a B-17 flight manual.
- Bowers, Peter. Boeing Aircraft Since 1916. London: Putnam, 1966
- Craven, Wesley Frank and James Lea Gate, Editors. The Army Air Forces in WWII. Chicago: University of Chicago Press, 1948–1958. Vols I–III. USAF Historical Division.
- Green, William. Famous Bombers of the Second World War. Garden City, NY: Hanover House, 1960. Vols. I & II.
- Greenfield, Kent. American Strategy in World War II: A Reconsideration. Baltimore: Johns Hopkins Press, 1963.
- Swansborough, Gordon. United States Military Aircraft Since 1909. New York and London: Putnam, 1963.
- Thompson, Scott. Final Cut, The Postwar B-17 Flying Fortress: The Survivors. Missoula, Montana: Pictorial Histories Publishing Company, 1990.
- U.S. Strategic Bombing Survey, The. Overall Report. Washington, D.C., 1945.
- Webster, Sir Charles Kingsley. The Strategic Air Offensive Against Germany, 1935-1945. London: Her Majesty's Stationery Office, 1961.
- B-17G. Grissom Air Force Base: files of the Heritage Museum Foundation, date unknown. Note: document tracing the history of 44-83690, compiler unknown.
- U.S. Air Force Museum Loan Inventory. Grissom Air Force Base: files of the Heritage Museum Foundation, date unknown. Note: an inventory, with serial numbers.
