= Grissom Air Museum =

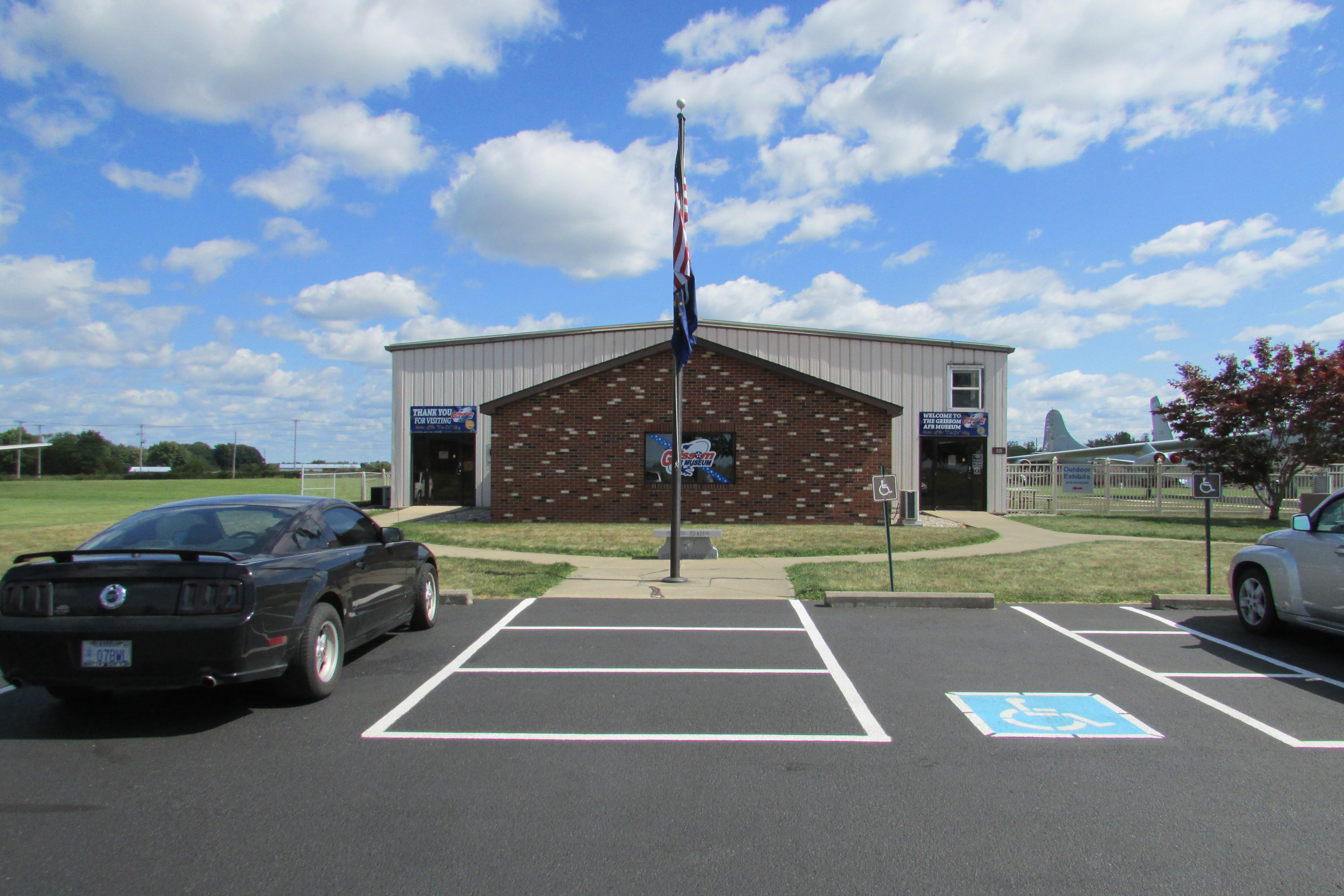

- Location within Indiana
- Established: 1981
- Location: 1000 W. Hoosier Blvd. Peru, Indiana 46970
- Coordinates: 40.669399°N 86.130229°W
- Type: Aviation museum
- Founder: John Crume
- Website: Official website

The Grissom Air Museum is a military aviation museum near Grissom Air Reserve Base Peru, Indiana with over twenty aircraft on display.

== History ==
The museum's origins date to 1981, when the Grissom Air Force Base Heritage Museum Foundation was formed by John Crume and six other military veterans to preserve the aircraft located at the base. The Grissom Air Museum was started in 1987 when aircraft were moved to an area outside the northern main gate from a location on base.

The indoor museum was completed in 1991. Its fortunes began to decline in 1992, when the Air Force announced that six airplanes at the museum would be transferred to other sites. Less than a year later, a feasibility study suggested that the museum needed new leadership and additional funding. After another year the situation had improved, with enough money being raised to keep the airplanes on location. In 1995, the museum was transferred from the United States Air Force Museum system to the Indiana State Museum and Historic Sites system. The museum obtained two "new-in-box" Quonset huts for additional display space in 1997. Then, in 2010, the museum was dropped from the latter system.

In 2015, the museum's B-17 was disassembled and transferred to the Museum of Aviation for restoration. By 2020, the museum was raising funds to construct a shelter for the B-58. The Board of Trustees approved plans for the building in September 2025.

== Collection ==
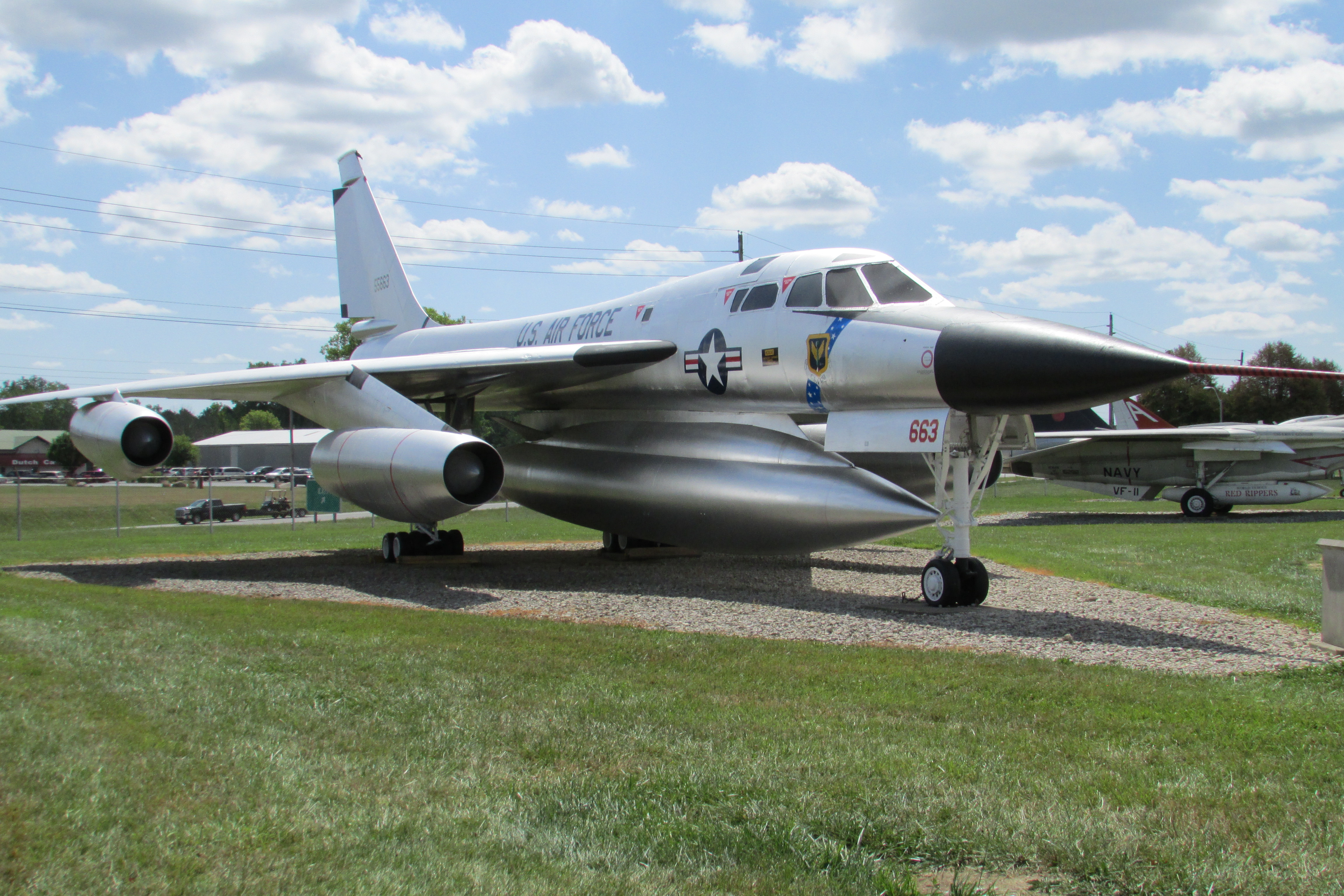
Convair TB-58A Hustler

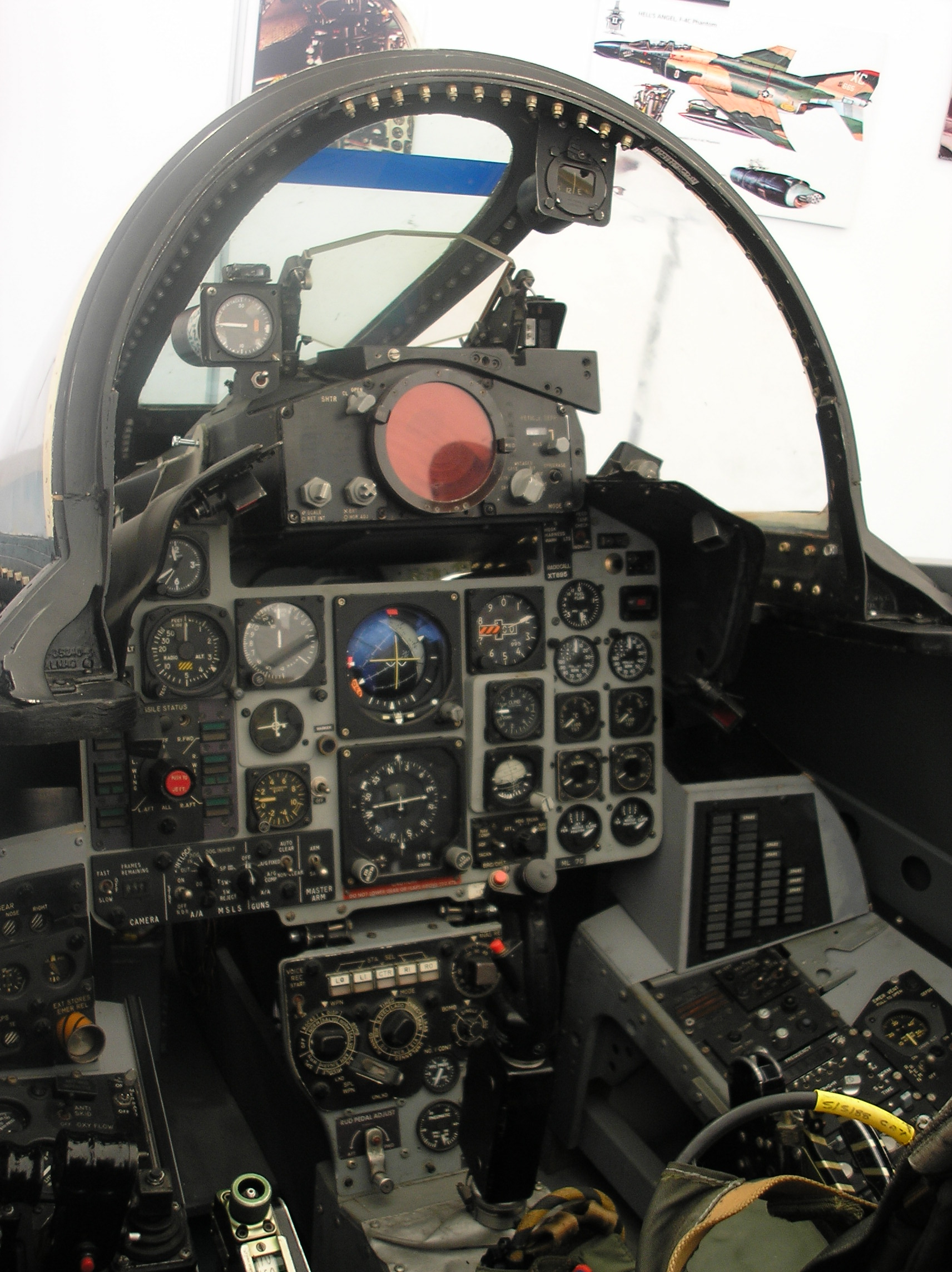
Interior of an F-4 Phantom

The museum has over twenty aircraft on outdoor display, reflecting both the base's history and that of the United States Air Force and the United States Navy. The indoor museum contains a number of artifacts related to the United States Naval Training Station at Bunker Hill (1942–46), Bunker Hill Air Force Base (1954–1968), the Grissom Air Force Base (1968–1994), and the Grissom Air Reserve Base (1994–present). Other sit-in displays, including an F-4 Phantom cockpit, Huey Helicopter, MJ-1 Bomb Loader, A-10 Trainer, and an F-16 Mock Cockpit.

=== Aircraft ===
- Bell UH-1H Iroquois 68-16256
- Boeing B-47B Stratojet 51-2315
- Boeing EC-135L 61-0269
- Boeing KC-97L Stratofreighter 52-2697
- Cessna O-2A Skymaster 68-6871
- Cessna T-37B Tweet 54-2736
- Cessna U-3A 57-5922
- Douglas TA-4J Skyhawk 153671
- Convair TB-58A Hustler 55-0663
- Convair TF-102A Delta Dagger 56-2317
- Douglas C-47D Skytrain 43-49270
- Fairchild C-119G Flying Boxcar 52-5850
- Fairchild Republic A-10A Thunderbolt II 77-0228
- Grumman C-1A Trader 136790
- Grumman F-11A Tiger 141790
- Grumman F-14B Tomcat 162912
- Lockheed T-33A 52-9563
- McDonnell F-4C Phantom II 64-0783
- McDonnell F-101B Voodoo 58-0321
- NAMC YS-11A
- North American B-25J Mitchell 44-86843
- North American F-100C Super Sabre 53-1712
- North American T-2C Buckeye 158583
- Republic F-84F Thunderstreak 51-9456
- Republic F-105D Thunderchief 61-0088

=== Indoor exhibits ===
The cabin of a HH-1K and the cockpit of a F-4C are on display inside the museum building.

=== Tower ===
The entire Grissom Air Reserve Base and aircraft display are visible from the top of the five-story Cold War-era Observation Tower.

=== Events ===
Events on location include the Open House, Armed Forces Day Celebration, GUS Fly In, and Warbird Cruise-In.

== See also ==
- B-17G "Flying Fortress" No. 44-83690
- List of museums in Indiana
