= Aluminum Overcast =

Military Aircraft

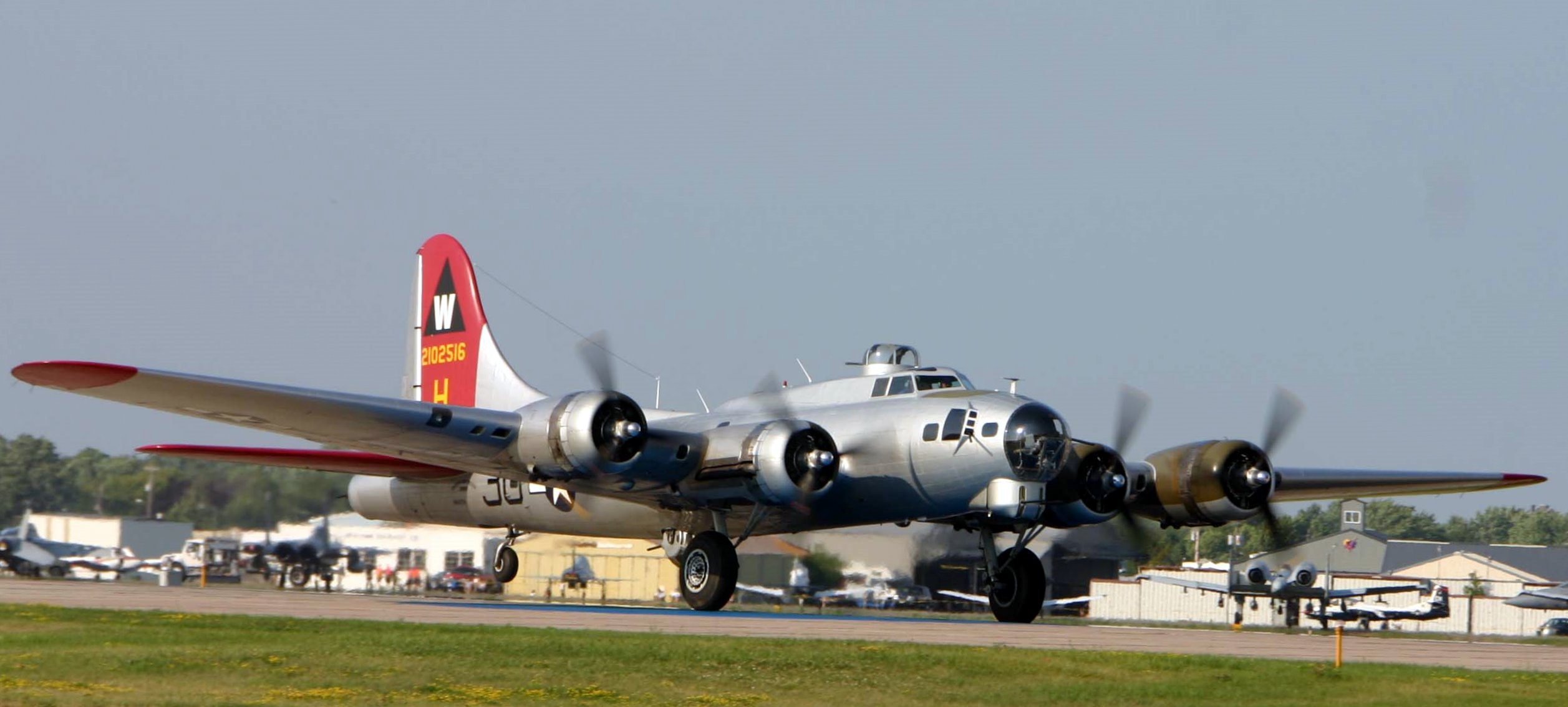
- Aluminum Overcast at the 2006 EAA AirVenture Oshkosh in Oshkosh, Wisconsin

General information
- Type: B-17G-105-VE Flying Fortress
- Manufacturer: Lockheed Corporation under license from Boeing
- Owners: Experimental Aircraft Association
- Registration: N5017N
- Serial: 44-85740

History
- Manufactured: 1945
- First flight: 18 May 1945
- Preserved at: Experimental Aircraft Association, Oshkosh, Wisconsin

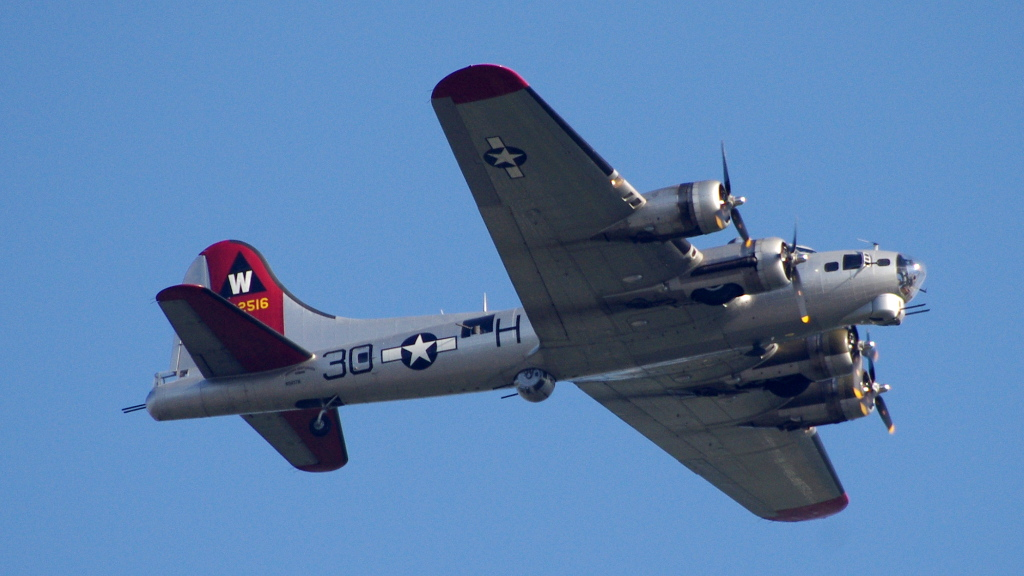
Sept 5, 2017

Aluminum Overcast, B-17G-105-VE, s/n 44-85740, civil registration N5017N, is one of the 46 complete surviving Boeing B-17 Flying Fortress airframes in existence. It never saw combat, and it escaped the fate of many aircraft that were scrapped after World War II. It is owned by the Experimental Aircraft Association (EAA), and, as of 2024, it is on display at the EAA Museum in Oshkosh, WI.

Through its association as the "flagship" of the EAA, Aluminum Overcast has become one of the most recognizable examples of the B-17, due to its extensive touring schedule with over one million flight miles accumulated. The overhaul and restoration of the airframe took more than 10 years and thousands of hours by staff and volunteers at EAA Oshkosh, Wisconsin, headquarters. Aluminum Overcast carries the colors of the 398th Bomb Group of World War II, which flew hundreds of missions over Nazi-held territory during the war. Aluminum Overcast commemorates B-17G AAF Serial No. 42-102516, shot down over France in 1944.

== History ==
B-17G-105-VE, 44-85740 was built by the Vega Division of Lockheed Aircraft Company and delivered to the U.S. Army Air Corps on 18 May 1945, too late to serve in Europe where most B-17s were destined. Declared surplus and initially stored in New York, the aircraft was sent to Altus, Oklahoma on 7 November 1945 where, stripped of all military equipment, it was sold as "scrap" for $750 in 1946 to Metal Products. The aircraft was rescued when resold shortly after to Universal Aviation, for use as an aerial mapping platform, acquiring civil registration N5017N.

On 2 August 1947, the aircraft was sold to Charles T. Winters, of Miami, Florida, who, in turn, sold it on 16 August 1947, to Joe Lopez of the Vero Beach Import and Export Company who purchased the aircraft to serve as a cargo hauler, hauling cattle in Florida and Puerto Rico. Its new role necessitated removing the original radio compartment and floor, replacing it with a strengthened floor. In 1949, Aero Service Corporation bought the aircraft and turned it back into an aerial photography and surveying platform. In this role, during the next 12 years, the B-17 carried out mapping operations over Arabia, Libya, Lebanon, Iran, Laos, Vietnam, Cambodia, Egypt and Jordan.

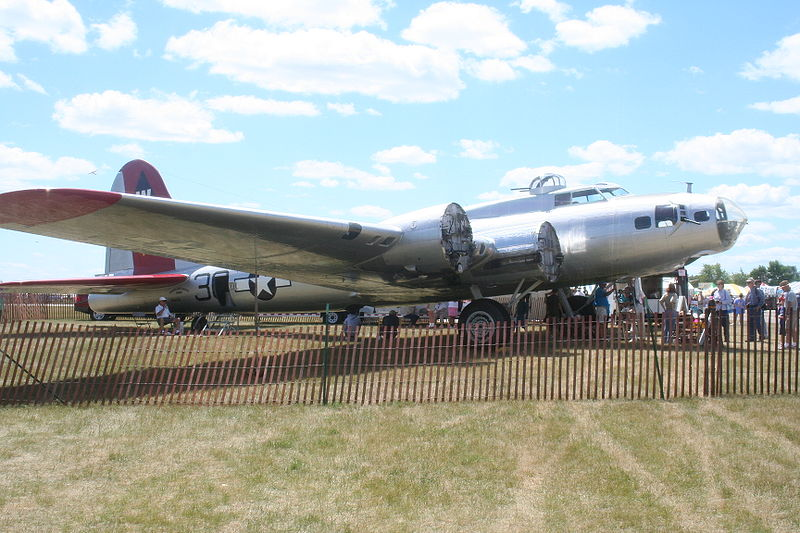
Aluminum Overcast during one of the periodic overhauls, 2005

Its next role was in aerial application with first Chris Stolzfus and Associates in 1962, and then Dothan Aviation Corporation in 1966, where the aircraft had a chemical hopper and spray bars fitted under the wings. After operating as a pest control, forest dusting and fire fighting aircraft, the aircraft wound up its postwar career in 1976.

In 1978, Dr. Bill Harrison, heading up "B-17s Around the World", funded the purchase of the aircraft, which had been parked in open storage in Dothan, Alabama for two years. Renamed Aluminum Overcast, the name commemorates the 601st Bomb Squadron, 398th Bomb Group (Heavy)'s B-17G #42-102516 that was shot down on its 34th combat mission over Le Manoir, France, on 13 August 1944. Veterans of the 398th Bomber Group helped finance the bomber's restoration. Harrison's group restored the B-17 to a near-wartime appearance, although no armament was installed, and flew the aircraft at numerous air shows across the United States. As financing for maintenance and further restoration became difficult, more ambitious plans, such as an around-the-world goodwill flight, were shelved.

=== EAA ===
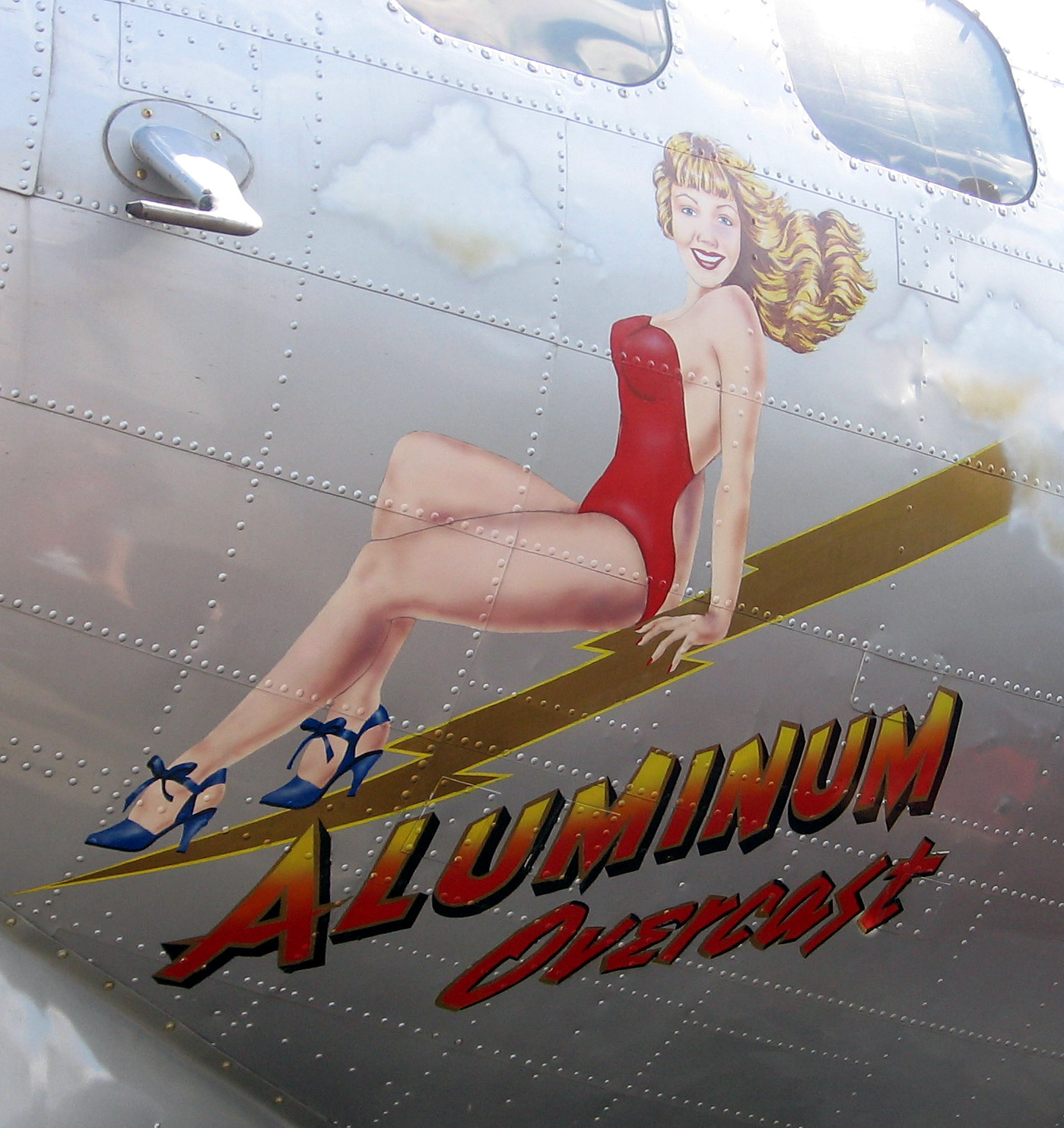
Nose art was redone in 1988

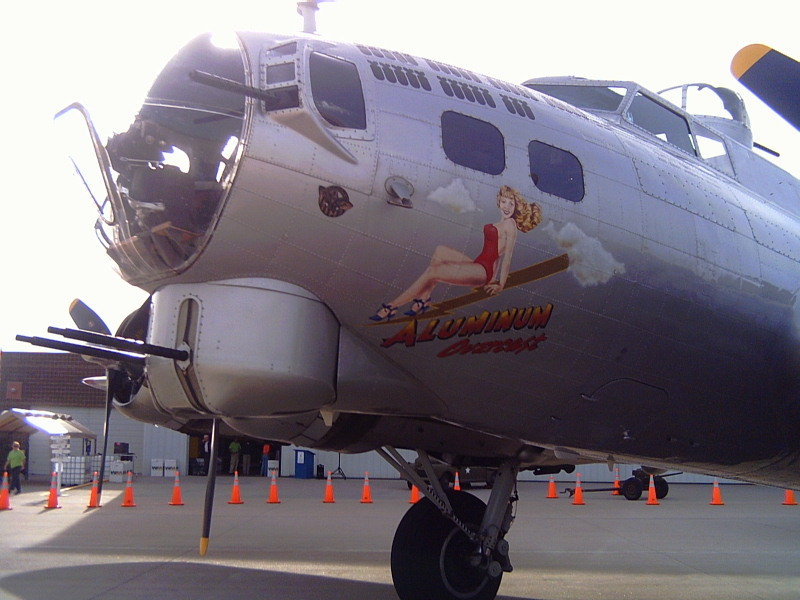
Aluminum Overcast for Denver and the Front Range Denventure 2007 tour stop at Centennial Airport, CO, 2007.

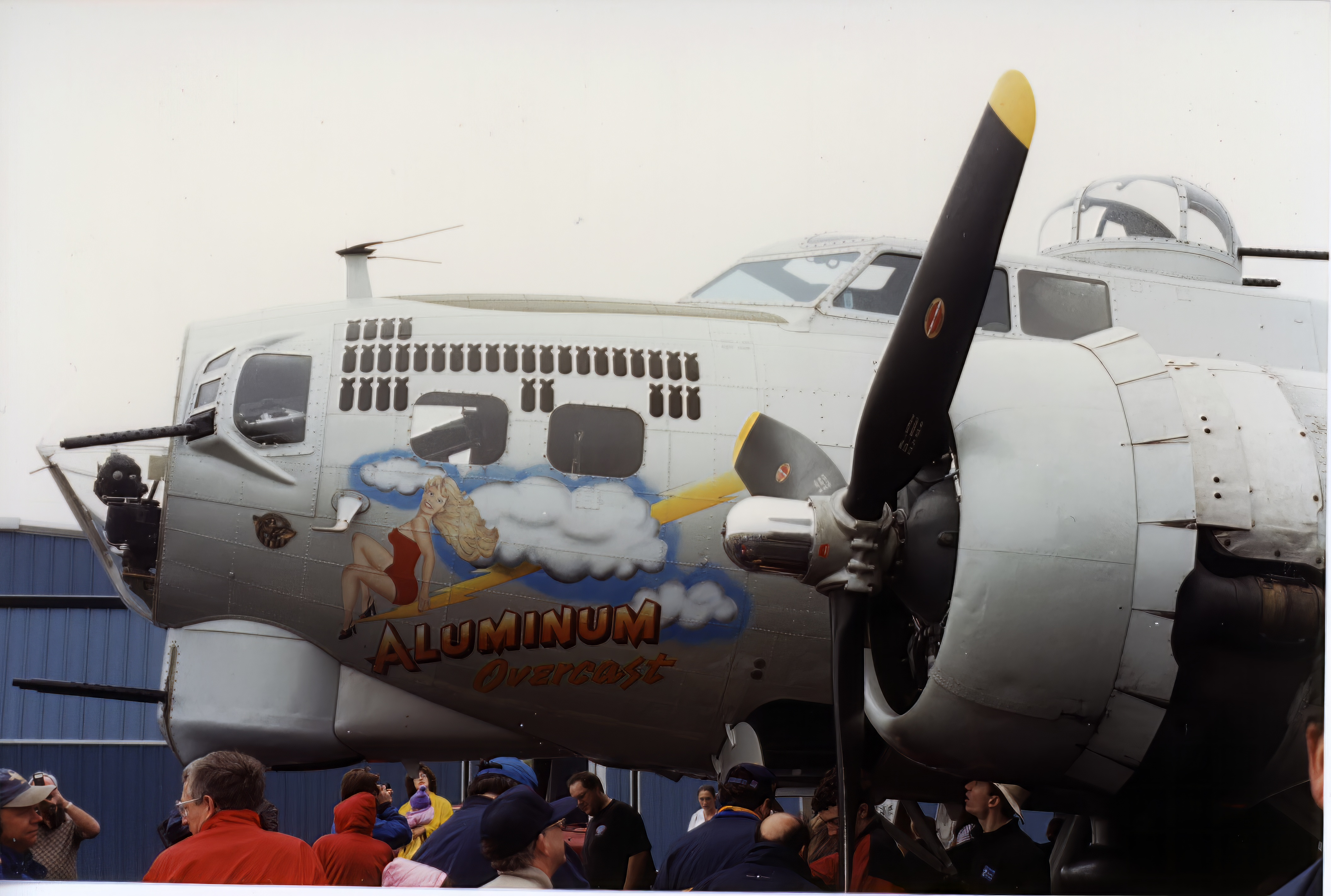
Nose showing art, bombs, and Norden bombsight

On 21 May 1979, the group donated the aircraft to the Experimental Aircraft Association (EAA) Aviation Foundation, under the auspices of the B-17 Historical Society. Aluminum Overcast was put on display until 1983, before it began a 10-year restoration. The extensive work involved the rebuilding of all the interior stations, including the radio compartment, waist gunners' stations, tail turret and navigator's station, and replacing the cabin flooring, as well as locating original equipment such as the Norden bombsight. Where authentic components were not available, realistic replicas, such as the new-manufacture top turret, were substituted. While the aircraft is about 95 percent authentic, recreating the configuration in 1945 when it rolled off the assembly line, concessions to technological improvements such as a modern radio and avionics suite are incorporated to meet the current airworthiness requirements.

Sent to the EAA's Kermit Weeks Flight Research Center in Florida in 1993, the aircraft was prepared for its first tour, which began in 1994. At present, of the 48 surviving B-17s, there are only 9 such B-17s still airworthy, with Aluminum Overcast, the high-time leader, already logging 6,000 flight hours by 1969. When Aluminum Overcast is on tours, flying extensively throughout the United States and Canada, it serves as the EAA's showcase aircraft. During a typical 60-city tour, flights are interspersed with opportunities for visitors to actually walk through the aircraft. The connection to the wartime B-17 is maintained through the involvement of many EAA volunteers, some of whom have a personal connection to the period. One of the initial flight crew was Col Harold "Hal" Weekley (ret'd), who had flown the original namesake that was shot down over France. Half-hour flights are also available at all tour stops, with proceeds from the tour helping to keep Aluminum Overcast flying and assisting in the continuing restoration, maintenance and preservation efforts of EAA.

Its paint scheme was redone in 1988 and now features a flat aluminum metallic flake paint. Aluminum Overcast is based at EAA's Kermit Weeks Hangar in Wittman Regional Airport (OSH), Oshkosh, Wisconsin. The aircraft's annual multi-city tour is scheduled for spring through fall, with maintenance scheduled for the winter months. As of August 2024 Aluminum Overcast is not flying. It is in the Eagle Hangar at the Experimental Aircraft Museum in Oshkosh, WI. It is awaiting wing spar repair.
