= 534th Training Squadron =

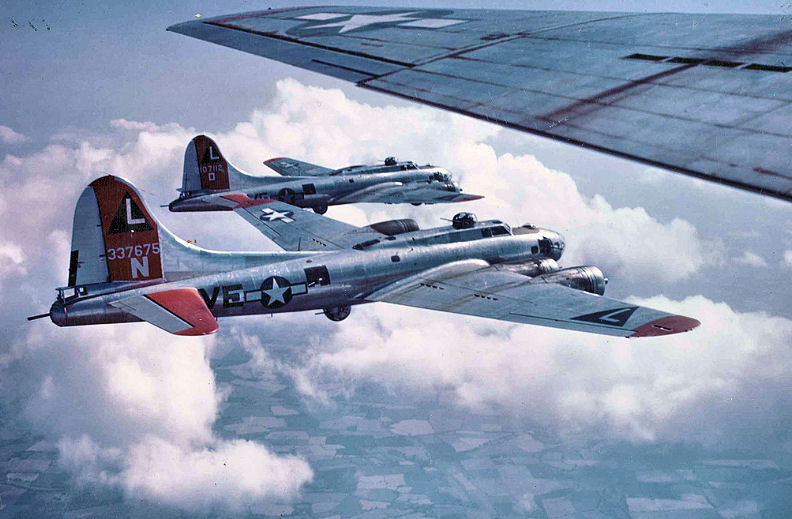
- 381st Group B-17 Flying Fortresses en route to a target (Note: In formation with Boeing B-17G-70-BO Flying Fortress, serial 43-37675, Patches/Flak Magnet VE-N and Douglas Aircraft built Boeing B-17G-35-DL Flying Fortress, serial 42-107112, Sleepy Time Gal, VE-D. Baugher, Joe (7 March 2023). "1942 USAF Serial Numbers". Joe Baugher.Baugher, Joe (10 April 2023). "1943 USAF Serial Numbers". Joe Baugher.)
- Active: 1942–1945; 1947–1949; 1994–2003
- Country: United States
- Branch: United States Air Force
- Role: Satellite control training
- Engagements: European Theater of Operations
- Decorations: Distinguished Unit Citation; Air Force Outstanding Unit Award

Insignia
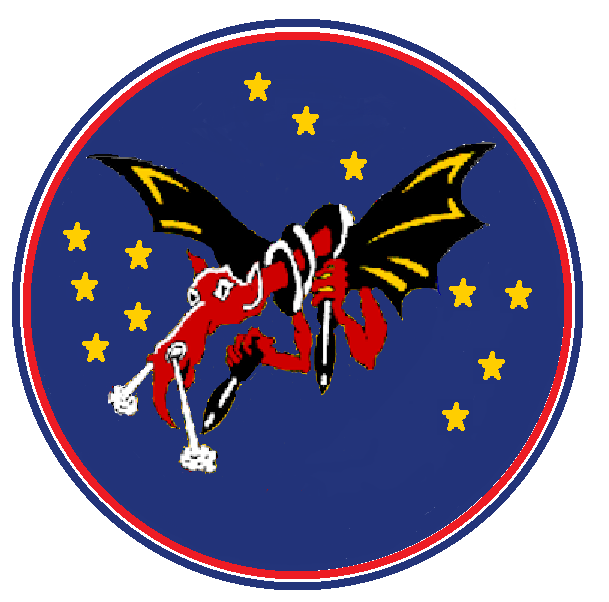
- 534th Training Squadron emblem (c. 2000)

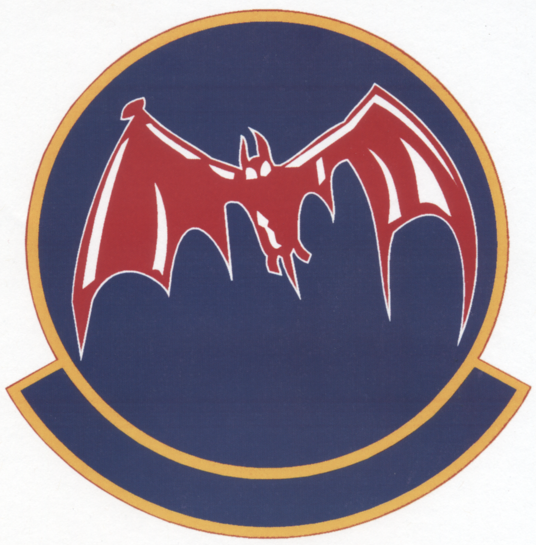
- 534th Training Squadron emblem (c. 1995)

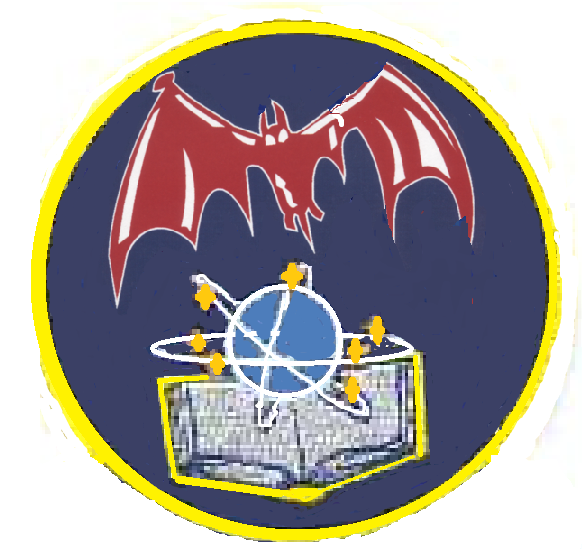
- 534th Training Squadron emblem (1994)

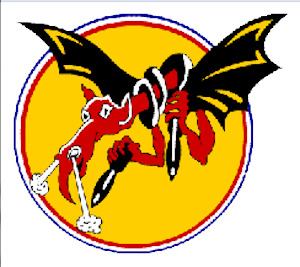
- 534th Bombardment Squadron emblem (Note: Approved 11 September 1944. Description: Over and through a yellow lemon disc, border triparted red, white, and blue, a prehistoric bat, in flight, red and white, with wings black, trimmed yellow, snorting steam from the nostrils, and grasping a small black aerial bomb in each foot.)
- World War II fuselage code: GD

The 534th Training Squadron is an inactive United States Air Force unit. It was last assigned to the 381st Training Group at Vandenberg Air Force Base, California, where it conducted qualification training for airmen in satellite control operations and maintenance.

During World War II, the squadron engaged in combat in the European Theater of Operations as the 534th Bombardment Squadron, earning two Distinguished Unit Citations. It was inactivated after V-E Day, but was active in the reserve from 1947 to 1949, although it is not clear whether it was fully equipped or manned.

== History ==
=== World War II ===
==== Training in the United States ====
The squadron was first activated on 3 November 1942 at Gowen Field, Idaho as the 534th Bombardment Squadron, one of the four original squadrons of the 381st Bombardment Group. It gathered its initial cadre at Gowen, but only began training for combat with the Boeing B-17 Flying Fortress after moving to Pyote Army Air Field, Texas at the end of the year. On 8 May 1943, the ground echelon began moving to the port of embarkation at Camp Kilmer, New Jersey, and boarded the RMS Queen Elizabeth for the European Theater of Operations on 27 May. The air echelon marshalled at Salinas Army Air Field, Kansas and began movement by the North Atlantic Ferry Route on 15 May.

==== Combat in the European Theater ====
The air echelon of the squadron arrived at RAF Bovingdon in late May 1943. The following month, the squadron was reunited at RAF Ridgewell, which was to be its combat station for the rest of the war. The squadron entered the strategic bombing campaign against Germany, when it flew its first mission on 21 June, a diversionary attack against Antwerp. Its targets in France included an aircraft assembly plant near Villacoublay, and an engine plant at Le Mans, locks at Saint-Nazaire, and Amiens – Glisy Aerodrome. It also attacked an aircraft plant in Brussels, Belgium. During Blitz Week, it bombed nitrate factories in Heroya, Norway, stopping production for over three months.

The squadron also flew deeper penetration missions into Germany. It hit oil refineries at Gelsenkirchen, submarine pens at Kiel, aircraft plants at Kassel and Leipzig, industrial targets in Münster, marshalling yards at Offenberg, and the ball bearing plants at Schweinfurt. On 8 October 1943, despite heavy enemy interceptor opposition, it accurately struck shipyards at Bremen, for which it was awarded the Distinguished Unit Citation (DUC). All squadron bombers that returned from this mission (Note: Eight of the 17 bombers dispatched by the 381st Group were shot down on this mission. Freeman, p. 75.) received battle damage. It received a second DUC for attacks on aircraft plants in Germany on 11 January 1944. In late February 1944, the unit participated in Big Week, the intensive attacks on the German aircraft industry.

The squadron was occasionally taken off strategic operations to perform air support and interdiction missions. It bombed bridges and airfields near the beachhead to support Operation Overlord, the invasion of Normandy, in June 1944. The following month, it attacked positions of enemy forces opposing Operation Cobra, the breakout at Saint Lo. It supported Operation Market Garden, the airborne attacks in the Netherlands near Arnhem, in the fall. From December 1944, through January 1945, it attacked lines of communications and airfields near the battle zone during the Battle of the Bulge. It also supported the Allied crossing of the Rhine and push through central Germany in March 1945.

==== Return to the United States and inactivation ====
The squadron flew its last mission on 26 April 1945 and the majority of the unit's aircraft departed the theater on 24 May 1945. Ground personnel sailed on the RMS Queen Elizabeth on 24 June, arriving in the US by the end of the month. The squadron was located at Sioux Falls Army Air Field, South Dakota a few days later and was inactivated on 24 August 1945.

=== Air Force reserve ===
The squadron was activated in February 1947 in the reserve at Sioux City Army Air Base, Iowa in the reserves, where its training was supervised by the 140th AAF Base Unit (later the 2470th Air Force Reserve Training Center) of Air Defense Command (ADC). It was originally assigned directly to Second Air Force, but the again became part of the 381st Group, which was located at Offutt Field, Nebraska. In May 1948, it was transferred to the 351st Bombardment Group, located at Scott Air Force Base, Illinois. Although designated a very heavy bombardment group, it does not appear to have been fully manned or equipped. In 1948 Continental Air Command assumed responsibility for managing reserve and Air National Guard units from ADC. President Truman’s reduced 1949 defense budget required reductions in the number of units in the Air Force, and the 534th was inactivated In June 1949, as reserve flying operations at Sioux City Airport ended.

=== Space training ===
The squadron was again activated in the fall of 1994 as the 534th Training Squadron when Air Education and Training Command expanded its space and missile systems training at Vandenberg Air Force Base, California from a single squadron to a group. The 534th was responsible for initial qualification training for crews in satellite command and control. In 2003, the 534th was inactivated and its training programs were transferred to the 533d Training Squadron.

== Lineage ==
- Constituted as the 534th Bombardment Squadron (Heavy) on 28 October 1942

Activated on 3 November 1942
Redesignated 534th Bombardment Squadron, Heavy on 20 August 1943
Inactivated on 28 August 1945.

- Redesignated 534th Bombardment Squadron, Very Heavy on 28 January 1947

Activated in the reserve on 27 February 1947
Inactivated on 27 June 1949

- Redesignated 534th Training Squadron on 4 August 1994

Activated on 1 October 1994
Inactivated in 2003

=== Assignments ===
- 381st Bombardment Group, 3 November 1942 – 28 August 1945
- Second Air Force, 27 February 1947
- 381st Bombardment Group, 15 September 1947
- 351st Bombardment Group, 3 May 1948 – 27 Jun 1949
- 381st Training Group, 1 October 1994 – 2003

=== Stations ===
- Gowen Field, Idaho, 3 November 1942
- Ephrata Army Air Base, Washington, 1 December 1942
- Pyote Army Air Field, Texas, 27 December 1942
- Pueblo Army Air Base, Colorado, 6 April–10 May 1943
- RAF Ridgewell (AAF-167), England, 2 June 1943 – 24 June 1945
- Sioux Falls Army Air Field, South Dakota, 3 July–28 August 1945
- Sioux City Army Air Base, Iowa, 27 February 1947 – 27 June 1949
- Vandenberg Air Force Base, California, 1 October 1994 – 2003

=== Aircraft ===
- Boeing B-17 Flying Fortress, 1942-1945

=== Awards and campaigns ===
Award streamer	Award	Dates	Notes
	Distinguished Unit Citation	8 October 1943	Bremen, 534th Bombardment Squadron
	Distinguished Unit Citation	11 January 1944	Germany, 534th Bombardment Squadron
	Air Force Outstanding Unit Award	1 May 1997-30 April 1999	534th Training Squadron
	Air Force Outstanding Unit Award	1 July 2000-30 June 2001	534th Training Squadron

Campaign Streamer	Campaign	Dates	Notes
	Air Offensive, Europe	2 June 1943 – 5 June 1944	534th Bombardment Squadron
	Air Combat, EAME Theater	2 June 1943 – 11 May 1945	534th Bombardment Squadron
	Normandy	6 June 1944 – 24 July 1944	534th Bombardment Squadron
	Northern France	25 July 1944 – 14 September 1944	534th Bombardment Squadron
	Rhineland	15 September 1944 – 21 March 1945	534th Bombardment Squadron
	Ardennes-Alsace	16 December 1944 – 25 January 1945	534th Bombardment Squadron
	Central Europe	22 March 1944 – 21 May 1945	534th Bombardment Squadron

== See also ==
- B-17 Flying Fortress units of the United States Army Air Forces
