= Aruliho =

- Village
- Location in Guadalcanal
- Coordinates: 9°17′3″S 159°44′0″E
- Country: Solomon Islands
- Province: Guadalcanal
- Island: Guadalcanal
- Time zone: UTC+11 (UTC)

Aruliho is a village in Guadalcanal, Solomon Islands. It is located 33.8 kilometres (21.0 mi) by road northwest of Honiara.
