= Gulf Coast Wing =

United States historical air display organization

The Gulf Coast Wing of the Commemorative Air Force is a United States historical air display organization which formerly included two sub-groups that participate in the display of vintage aircraft and public military history education about military aviation during World War II and beyond.

== "Texas Raiders" group ==
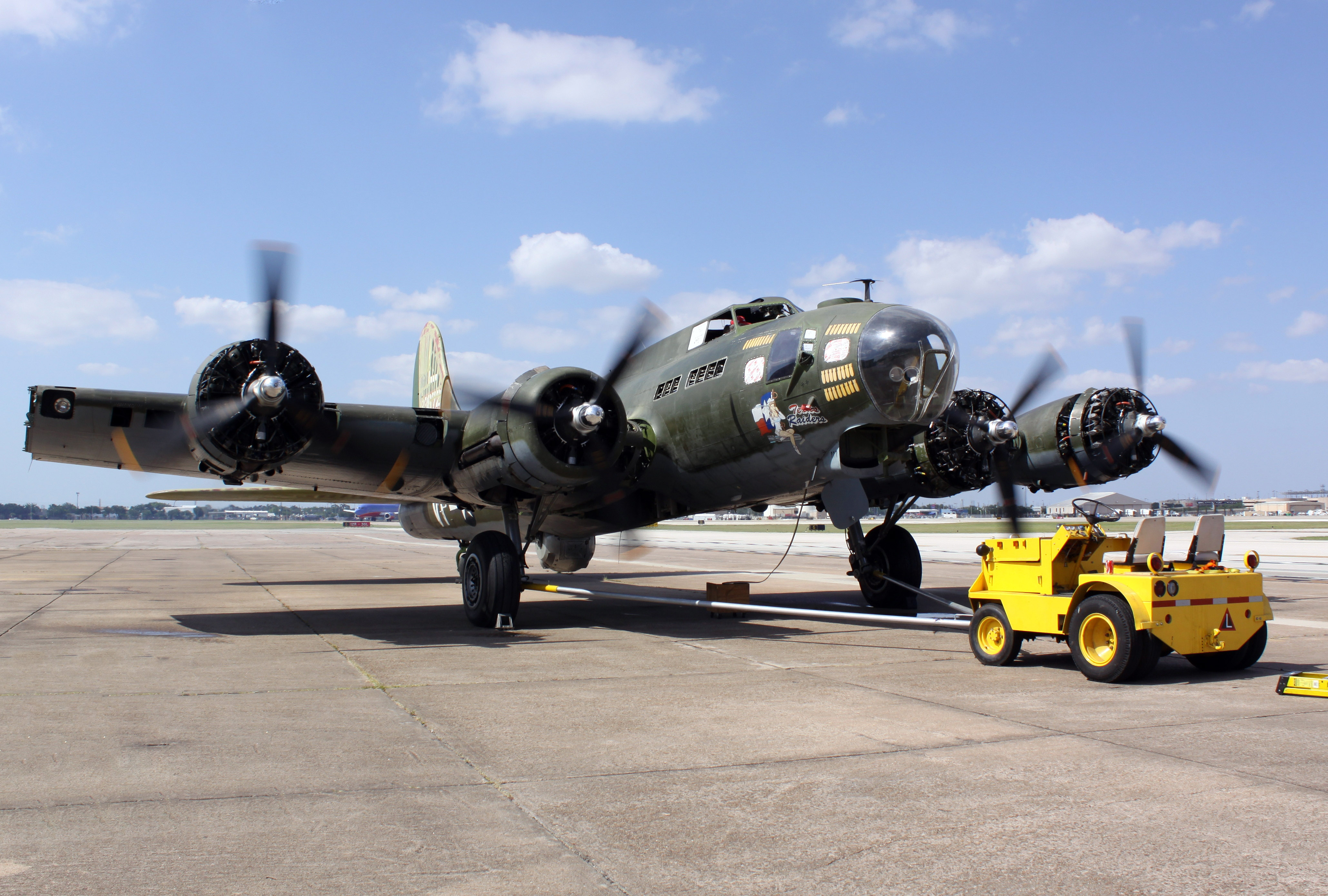
Texas Raiders starts its four engines for the first time in 5 years in July 2009

The Commemorative Air Force's Gulf Coast Wing encompassed the "Texas Raiders" group, who maintained and operated the Boeing B-17G Flying Fortress (former U.S. Navy PB-1W) named Texas Raiders, which crashed on November 12, 2022. It was based at the Conroe Regional Airport, located in Conroe, Texas. (Formerly based at David Wayne Hooks Memorial Airport in Tomball, Texas.)

== See also ==
- History of transport
