= Last Man Club (film) =

- Theatrical release poster
- Directed by: Bo Brinkman
- Written by: Bo Brinkman
- Produced by: Bo Brinkman
- Starring: James MacKrell; Kate French; William Morgan Sheppard; Barry Corbin
- Cinematography: Barry Strickland
- Edited by: Melissa Lawson; Cheung
- Music by: Rob Powers
- Production companies: Cactus Films; Pandolph Productions
- Distributed by: Freestyle Digital Media
- Release date: May 27, 2016
- Running time: 95 minutes
- Country: United States
- Language: English

Last Man Club is a 2016 drama film written, produced and directed by Bo Brinkman, and starring James McKrell, Kate French, Barry Corbin and William Morgan Sheppard in his final film role. The film depicts a World War II veteran who embarks on a road trip to find the last remaining members of his B-17 bombing crew.

== Plot ==
In a veteran's hospital in Galveston, Texas, Pete Williams (Barry Corbin), a World War II airman, has been angry and uncooperative, ending up in a psych ward. Terminally ill with only a few months left, Pete only wants to die with dignity. Nurse Ripley (Corbett Tuck), his sole friend at the hospital, helps him find one of his old B-17 bomber crew, pilot John "Eagle Eye" Pennell (James MacKrell).

Eagle's life at home with his son John (Michael Massee) is difficult as his fading memory has resulted in confused excursions and the loss of his driver's licence. John and his wife Hilary (Amy Kay Raymond) threaten to send his father to a retirement home but his son Taylor (Blaze Tucker) adores his grandfather and resists any effort to send him away. After receiving a letter from Pete, Eagle pulls out his late wife's 1958 Ford Fairlane and decides to set out to find the surviving members of his old bomber crew.

The cross-country odyssey begins badly when Eagle runs into Romy (Kate French), a young, gun-toting desperado who is escaping from her abusive partner, Joe Scanlin (William McNamara) with his ill-gotten money. The odd couple create an unlikely team as they search for other crew members, first finding Will Hodges (William Morgan Sheppard) Eagle's former co-pilot and saving Will from Diamond Jim (Jake Busey), his domineering boss. The veterans later meet up with another crew member, Grady Reeves (Richard Riehle), who is suffering from Alzheimer's disease, and dies in their company.

The two old friends continue their epic trip, with Eagle declaring to Romy, “Nothing is impossible if you have faith and an open heart.” Romy soon becomes the catalyst to the plan the two veterans hatch, sometimes getting them in more trouble as the police and Scanlin are hot on their trail.

Discovering an old Stearman biplane, with Romy's help, the two old pilots are able to get their hands on the controls once more, but their flight ends in a crash. Undeterred, the trio continue to try to find the "last man in the club".

When Eagle, Romy and Will finally locate Pete, he is about to be transferred to a psychiatric hospital. The trio of veterans, now back in their old uniforms, commandeer a Boeing B-17 Flying Fortress at an air museum and take the ancient bomber up once more, rekindling the old memories that were their bond in war.

After the unsanctioned hop, police officers are waiting for the group, taking them all into custody, although even Romy will have an easy time with the authorities, as she turns state's evidence against Scanlin. Eagle ultimately presents Romy with the keys to his wife's car as a gift.

== Cast ==
- Jim McKrell as John "Eagle Eye" Pennell
- Kate French as Romy
- William Morgan Sheppard as Will Hodges
- Barry Corbin as Pete Williams
- Jeremy London as Detective Lee
- Richard Riehle as Grady Reeves
- Michael Massee as John Pennell
- William McNamara as Joe Scanlin
- Jake Busey as Diamond Jim
- Jason Douglas as Detective Coats
- Corbett Tuck as Nurse Ripley
- Steve Wilder as Dr. Cliff Darby
- Gianni Capaldi as Dan Hanks
- Amy Kay Raymond as Hilary Pennell
- Blaze Tucker as Taylor Pennell
- Nick W. Nicholson as Dr. Jeffrey Campbell

== Production ==
Last Man Club was based on Bo Brinkman's 2002 short film of the same name. The project impetus came from Brinkman's knowledge of his father's role in World War II as a B-17 crew member. The film remained for years in pre-production awaiting stable financing and availability of key actors and crew.

Principal photography took place during 2015, at the Sholes Airport in Galveston, with the assistance of the Commemorative Air Force. The principal aircraft in Last Man Club was Texas Raiders, a ubiquitous Boeing B-17 B-17G-95-DL Flying Fortress. The Douglas-Long Beach built bomber came from the Commemorative Air Force’s Gulf Coast Wing and is hangared at General Aviation Services, located at Conroe North Houston Regional Airport, Conroe, Texas.

== Reception ==
Last Man Club was released in select theaters on May 27, 2016, to generally favourable reviews. Nav Qateel in his review for Influxmagazine, called the film, "A heartwarming tale of loyalty, honor, relationships, and getting old ... Not to be missed! 4/5 Stars."

=== Awards ===
Last Man Club was entered in regional, national and international film festivals, garnering 15 wins along with four unsuccessful nominations. At the Action on Film International Film Festival, USA 2016, the film won for Best Supporting Actor - Feature (William Morgan Sheppard), Best Actor - Feature (Jim McKrell) and Best Young Performer - Feature (Blaze Tucker). Notable other wins included Best Film at the Central Florida Film Festival 2016, GI Film Festival 2016, Life Fest Film Festival 2016 and Real to Reel Film and Video Festivals 2015/2016.
