= Henry Tippie =

American businessman (1927–2022)

- Born: January 5, 1927; Belle Plaine, Iowa, U.S.
- Died: February 20, 2022 (aged 95); Austin, Texas, U.S.
- Education: University of Iowa (BSC)
- Occupation(s): Businessman, investor, philanthropist
- Years active: 1944–2022
- Spouse: Patricia Tippie

Henry Bokholt Tippie (January 5, 1927 – February 20, 2022) was an American businessman. As part of the Rollins Corporation he was a key member of the team that purchased Orkin via one of the first large leveraged buyouts in American corporate history. In 2018, Tippie became the 17th member of the NYSE Wall of Innovators.

== Early life and education ==
Tippie was born in Belle Plaine, Iowa, on January 5, 1927. He was raised on a farm in rural Iowa. Upon graduation from high school, Tippie enlisted in the Army Air Force on the day before D-Day. He served in the Pacific theater. After his service in World War II, Tippie leveraged the G.I. Bill to enroll at the University of Iowa, studying to become a CPA.

== Career and philanthropy ==
Tippie played key roles at numerous firms, including Rollins, Dover Gaming and Dover Motor Sports.

He supported numerous causes. A 1999 donation to the University of Iowa stands as the largest individual contribution to date, resulting in the Tippie College of Business being named in his honor. Allegheny College's Tippie Alumni Center was named after the couple.

Tippie was a Gold Life member of the Commemorative Air Force (CAF) from 1977 until his death and was a founding member of the CAF's American Airpower Heritage Foundation. He was also a member of the CAF B-29/B-24 Squadron, one of several CAF units based at the CAF National Airbase at Dallas Executive Airport. The CAF's flagship museum, the National Aviation Education Center (NAEC), is named in his honor.

== Death ==
Tippie died on February 20, 2022, at the age of 95.
