= Commemorative Air Force Museum =

Commemorative Air Force Museum may refer to:

- CAF Airbase Arizona in Mesa, Arizona
- CAF Airbase Georgia in Peachtree City, Georgia
- CAF Minnesota Wing Museum in Inver Grove Heights, Minnesota
- CAF Rocky Mountain Wing Museum in Grand Junction, Colorado
- CAF Southern California Wing Museum in Camarillo, California
- CAF Utah Wing Museum in Heber City, Utah
- Midland Army Air Field Museum in Midland, Texas
- National Aviation Education Center in Dallas, Texas
