= Texas Raiders =

American WWII aircraft

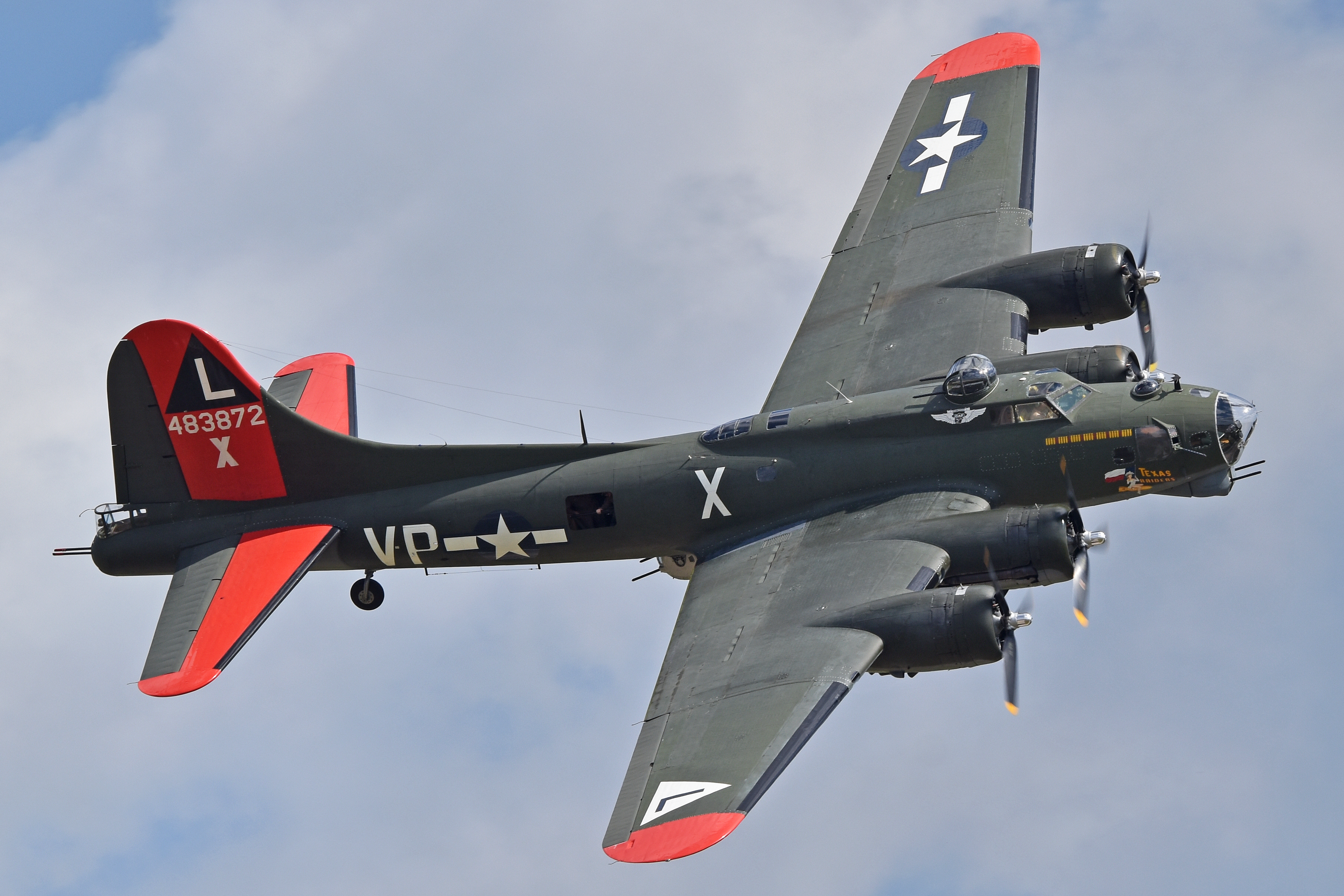
- Texas Raiders during the 2019 Wings over Houston Airshow

General information
- Type: Boeing B-17G-95-DL Flying Fortress/PB-1W
- Manufacturer: Douglas Aircraft Company, Long Beach, California
- Owners: United States Army Air Force; United States Navy; Aero Service Corporation; Commemorative Air Force (Note: The officially listed owner of the aircraft at the time it crashed was the American Airpower Heritage Flying Museum of Dallas.)
- Construction number: AC-1862
- Registration: N7227C
- Serial: 44-83872 / BuNo. 77235

History
- Manufactured: July 12, 1945
- Last flight: November 12, 2022
- Fate: Destroyed in mid-air collision

Texas Raiders was an American Boeing B-17 Flying Fortress, a B-17G-95-DL built by Douglas Long Beach. In 1967, it was purchased by the Commemorative Air Force's Gulf Coast Wing "Texas Raiders" group, which maintained and flew the aircraft out of Conroe-North Houston Regional Airport in Conroe, Texas. The aircraft was destroyed on November 12, 2022, by a mid-air collision with a P-63 Kingcobra at an air show at Dallas Executive Airport, Texas, that killed all five occupants and the P-63 pilot.

== History of the aircraft ==
=== Early history ===
The plane was built in 1945 under license from Boeing by Douglas Aircraft Corporation at its plant in Long Beach, California. One of the last 20 B-17s built by Douglas, it was delivered to the U.S. Army Air Forces as B-17G-95-DL 44-83872 on July 12, 1945. On July 21, 1945, all 20 were transferred to the U.S. Navy to serve as PB-1W patrol bombers. 44-83872 was assigned the U.S. Navy Bureau of Aeronautics Number (BuNo) 77235.

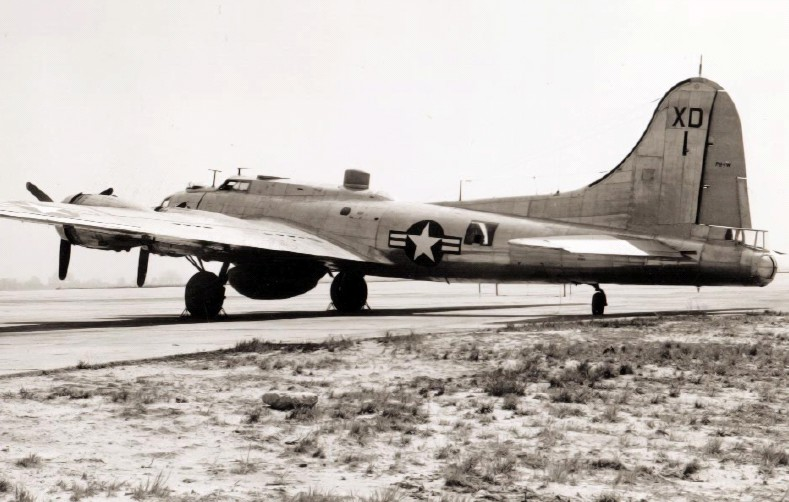
PB-1W BuNo 77235 in May 1949

The Navy used PB-1Ws as the original Airborne Warning and Command System or AWACS aircraft, as well as for electronic countermeasures, anti-submarine warfare and hurricane hunters. The Navy sealed up the bomb bay doors and installed 300-US-gallon (1,100 L) wing-mounted drop tanks and the AN/APS-20 Seasearch radar equipment in a bulbous housing below the former bomb bay. Radio direction finder (RDF), instrument landing system (ILS), and long-range navigation (LORAN) were also installed at this time. The aircraft was left unpainted, but waxed to prevent corrosion, and kept its original Browning M2 machine guns.

In January 1955, the PB-1W was phased out in favor of the new Lockheed PO-1W and WV-2 (naval versions of the EC-121 Warning Star) based on the Lockheed Constellation. BuNo 77235 was flown to Litchfield Park, Arizona, and placed in flyable storage status until officially retired from naval service on August 25, 1955, with 3,257 hours flying time.

Aero Service Corporation bought BuNo 77235 for $17,510 ($200,000 today) on October 1, 1957. Registered as N7227C, the plane flew aerial survey missions from Alaska to Central America to the North Sea. On January 12, 1965, it was used as a backdrop at the retirement ceremony of General Curtis LeMay. Aero Service Corporation sold the plane on September 22, 1967.

=== Commemorative Air Force ownership ===
The Commemorative Air Force (CAF), known as the Confederate Air Force until 2001, acquired the plane in 1967 for $50,000 or $80,000; sources differ. The plane was kept in Brownwood, Texas, because CAF's home airfield in Mercedes, Texas, was too short for a B-17. A CAF photo taken around 1969 shows the plane painted white with a large U.S. flag on the tail.

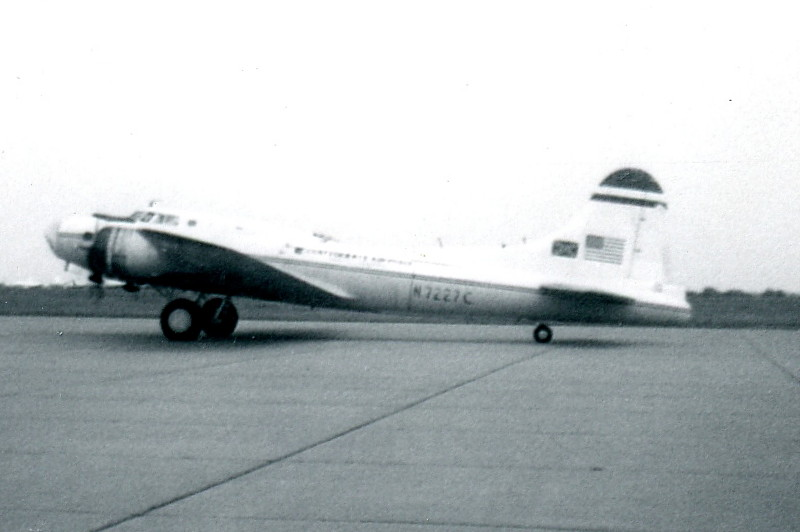
B-17 N7227C, Confederate Air Force air show, Greater Southwest International Airport (AKA Amon Carter Field), Tarrant County, Texas

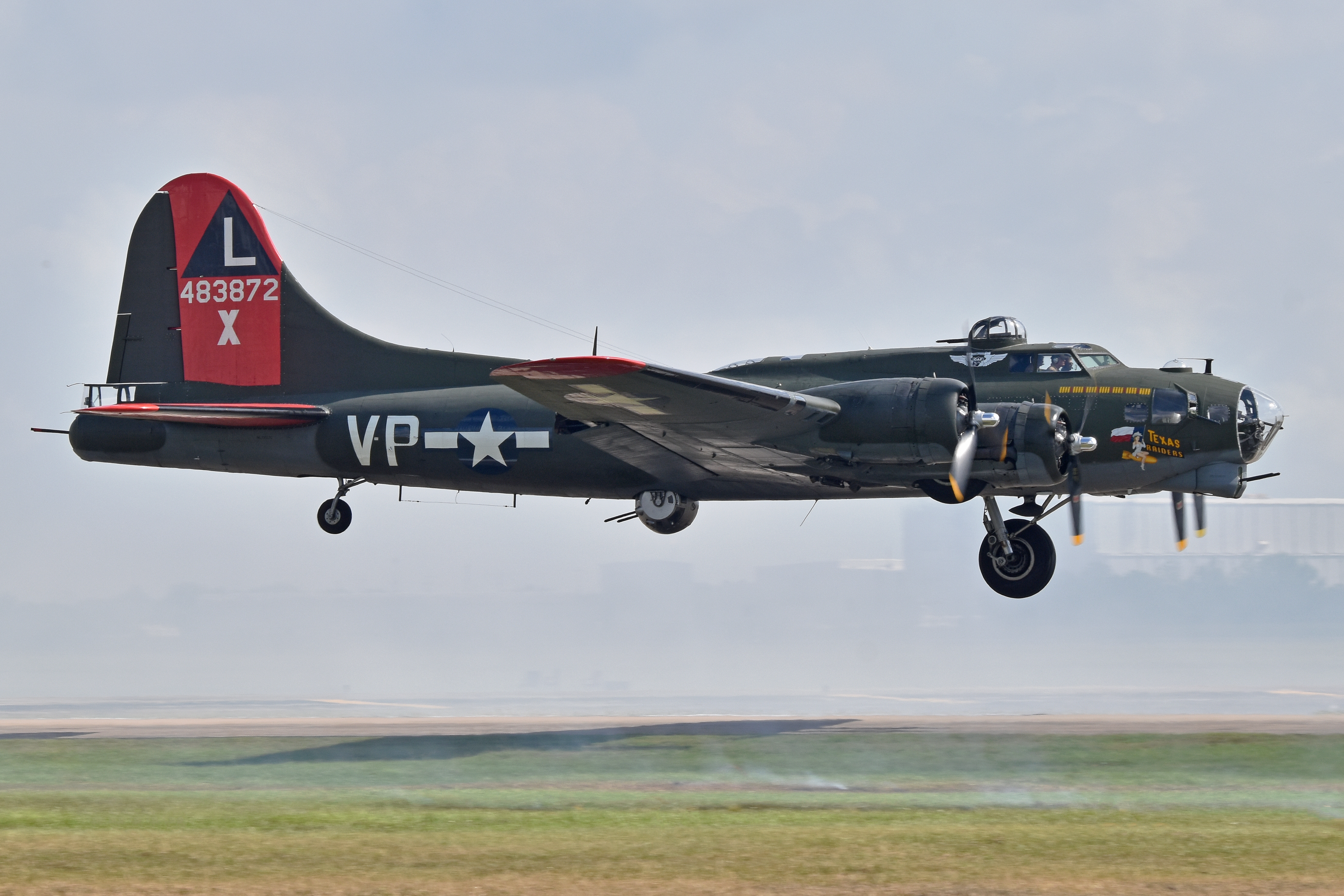
Texas Raiders in flight in October 2019

In July 1970, the plane was given its first historical paint job, that of the 366th Bombardment Squadron of the 305th Bombardment Group, with squadron code KY and call letter D on the fuselage and tail number 124592, suggested by retired general LeMay. In 1974, the CAF assigned the plane to its three-year-old Gulf Coast Wing. The plane was named Texas Raiders around 1973 to honor Texas combat veterans; the name had not been used by any previous B-17.

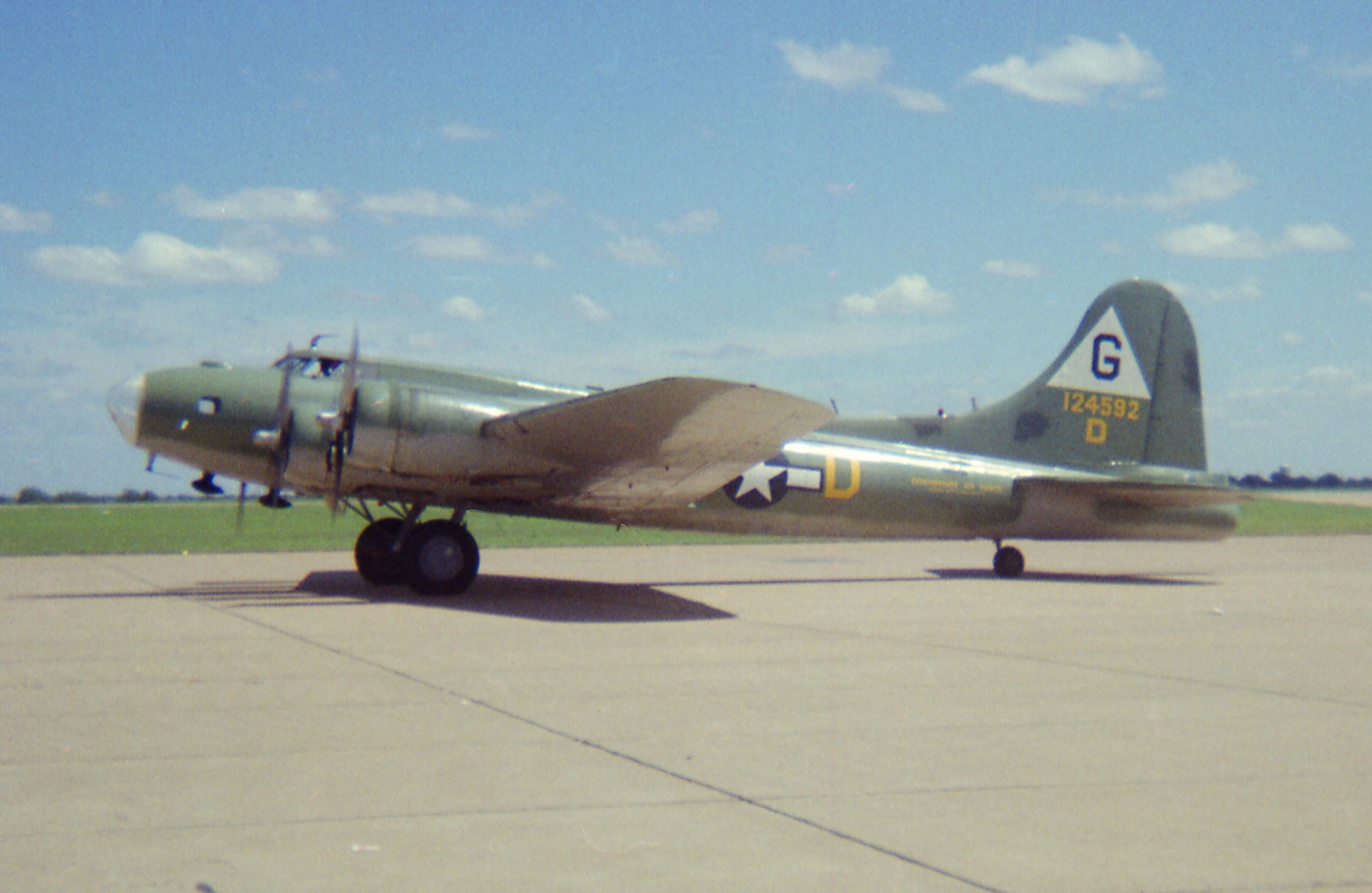
B-17G N7227C as restored ca. 1972; Confederate Air Force air show, Greater Southwest International Airport (AKA Amon Carter Field), Tarrant County, Texas

Over two decades, CAF worked to restore the plane to a B-17G configuration. Tradeoffs made in consideration of budget included disabling turbochargers and the crew oxygen system. In 1977, the plane was repainted in the color scheme of the 533d Bombardment Squadron of the 381st Bombardment Group. The livery was inspired by a real B-17G plane, Princess Pat (42-97503), including squadron code VP with call letter X, but using the actual tail number of Texas Raiders. At this time, a ball turret and top turret were added, although the interior was not yet restored.

The plane was restored and rebuilt from 1983 to 1986 at a cost of $300,000 (equivalent to $969,763 in 2025). This included restoring the interior of the plane to a B-17G configuration including the addition of period-correct equipment such as a Norden bombsight, M2 machine guns (non-functional), bomb bay racks, and a chin turret. During 1993 and 1994, the plane was repainted and corrosion repaired at a cost of about $180,000 (equivalent to $401,175 in 2025). The plane later underwent a lengthy and costly "wing spar terminal ends" replacement project, started in 2001 due to an FAA Airworthiness Directive (2001-22-06) citing corrosion in B-17 wings. Originally estimated to be a six-month process, the project turned into an 8 1/2-year effort costing nearly $700,000 (equivalent to $1,272,787 in 2025).

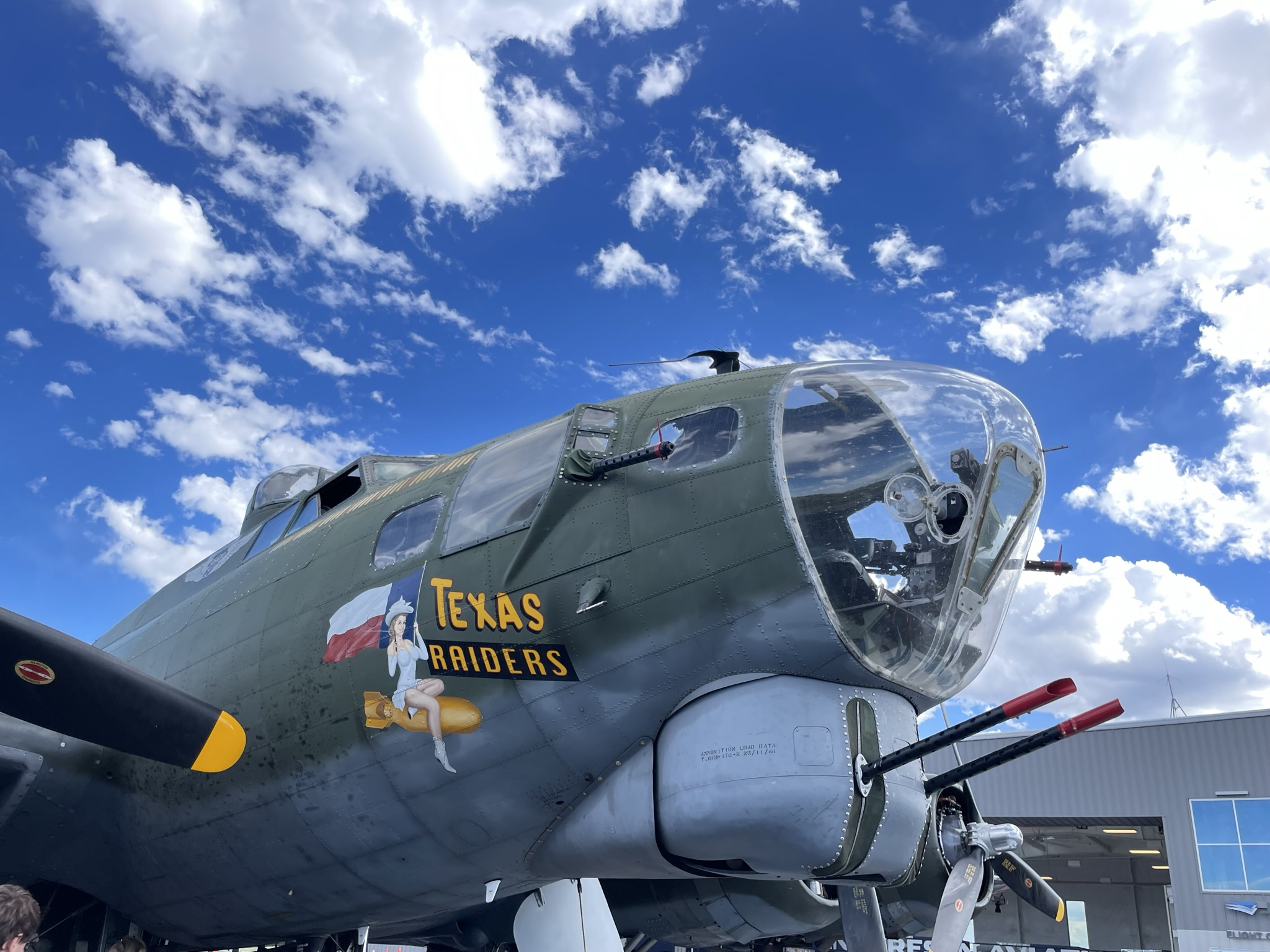
Texas Raiders nose art in September 2022

Texas Raiders returned to flight on October 14, 2009, and was featured at Wings Over Houston that month as a static display. In March 2010, the plane was moved to the Tomball Jet Center in David Wayne Hooks Memorial Airport (KDWH) in Tomball, Texas. Texas Raiders rejoined the air show circuit in 2010, just in time to commemorate the 75th anniversary of the first flight of the B-17. It traveled to the EAA AirVenture Oshkosh airshow, where it was featured in AeroShell Square. That summer, the plane appeared at Thunder Over Michigan as one of eight restored B-17s, flying in formation with Yankee Lady, movie Memphis Belle, Nine-O-Nine, Aluminum Overcast, Liberty Belle, Thunderbird, and Sentimental Journey.

On May 8, 2015, Texas Raiders flew in the Arsenal of Democracy Flyover in Washington, D.C., an event that commemorated the 70th anniversary of Victory in Europe Day (VE Day). The Gulf Coast Wing commissioned a complete new paint job and brand new nose art for Texas Raiders in late 2016, costing $190,000.

The plane was moved in March 2017 to General Aviation Services at Conroe North Houston Regional Airport in Conroe, Texas. Beginning in 2018, organizers worked with an Air Force parachute team to conduct demonstration skydives from the bomb bay during air shows.

== Destruction ==
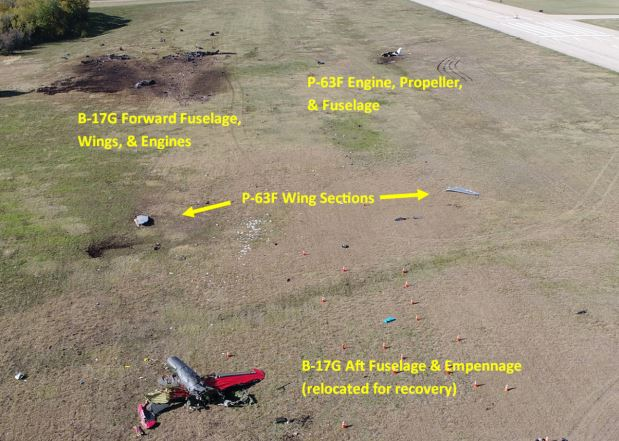
Photograph from Aviation Investigation Preliminary Report by the Nation Transportation Safety Board showing the debris field following the crash

The aircraft crashed on November 12, 2022, after a mid-air collision with a Bell P-63 Kingcobra at Dallas Executive Airport while performing during an air show. The P-63 collided with the B-17's port side on a descending trajectory, severing the fuselage just aft of the main wings. The bomber then crashed to the ground, destroying the remaining airframe. All six people aboard the two aircraft were killed. The cause of the accident was immediately placed under investigation.
