= 2022 Dallas air show mid-air collision =

Fatal accident during an air show in Texas, US

- The destruction of the two aircraft immediately after colliding; the forward section of Texas Raiders is visible at center-left, while the tail can be seen just below it, behind the vehicles in the foreground.

Accident
- Date: November 12, 2022, 1:22 p.m. CST (UTC-6)
- Summary: Mid-air collision
- Site: Dallas Executive Airport (RBD), Dallas, Texas; 32°40′25″N 96°51′45″W
- Total fatalities: 6
- Total survivors: 0

First aircraft
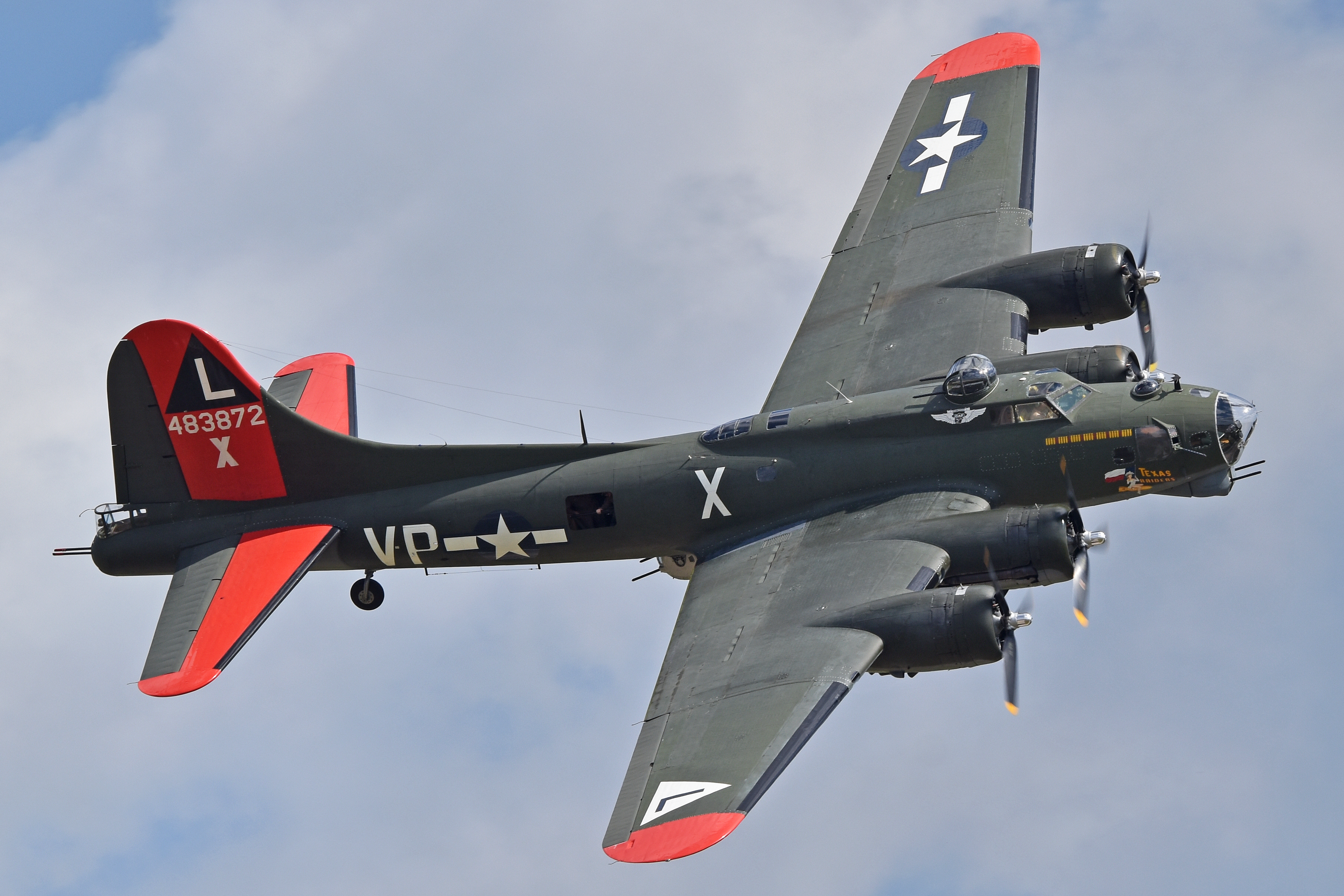
- N7227C, the B-17G involved in the accident, in October 2019
- Type: Boeing B-17G-95-DL/PB-1W Flying Fortress
- Name: Texas Raiders
- Operator: American Airpower Heritage Flying Museum
- Registration: N7227C; 44-83872 (s/n); 77235 (BuNo)
- Flight origin: Dallas Executive Airport, Dallas, Texas
- Occupants: 5
- Crew: 5
- Fatalities: 5
- Survivors: 0

Second aircraft
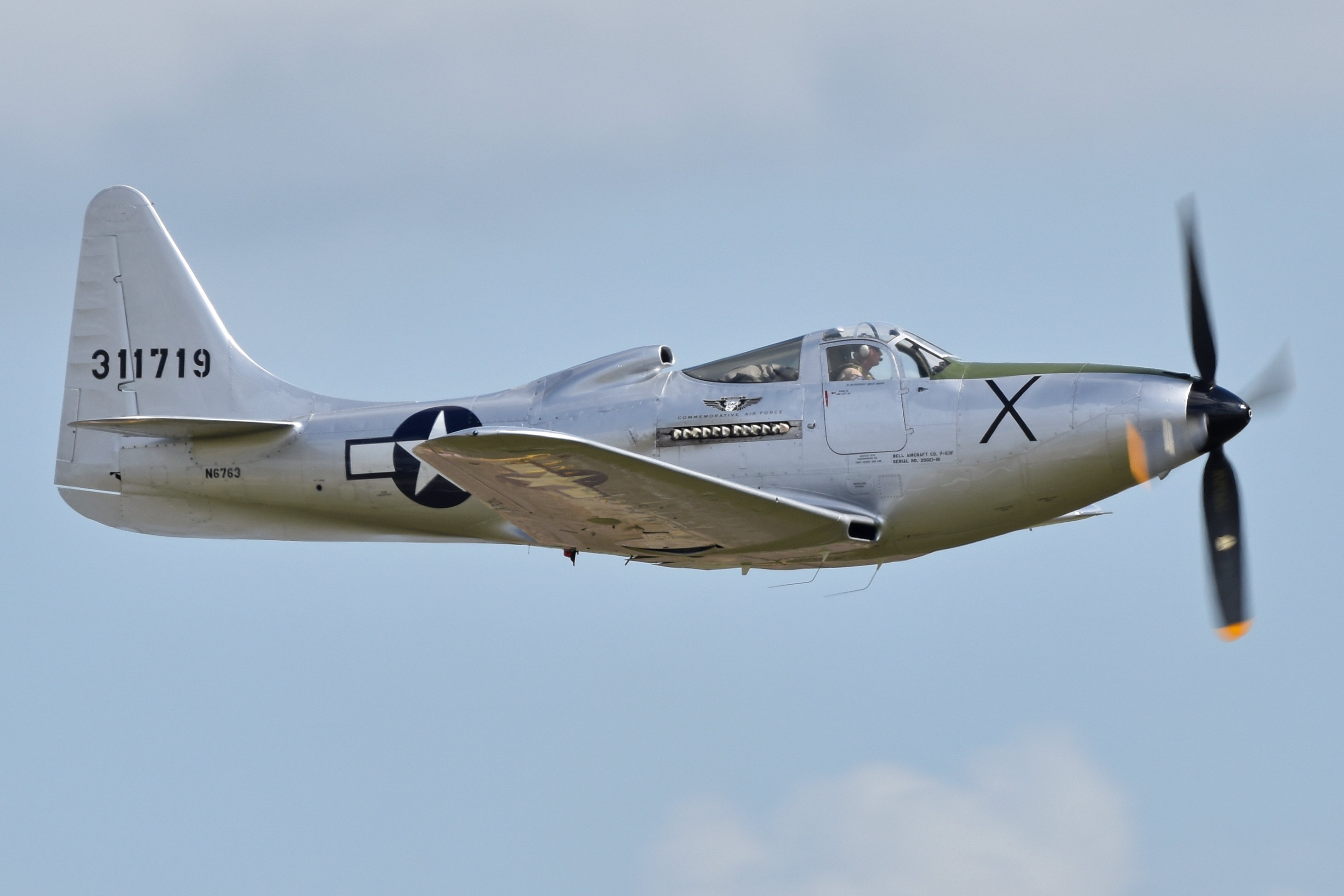
- N6763, the Bell P-63F involved in the accident, in October 2019
- Type: Bell P-63F-1-BE Kingcobra
- Operator: American Airpower Heritage Flying Museum
- Registration: N6763; 43-11719 (s/n)
- Flight origin: Dallas Executive Airport, Dallas, Texas
- Occupants: 1
- Crew: 1
- Fatalities: 1
- Survivors: 0

On November 12, 2022, two World War II–era restored aircraft, a B-17 Flying Fortress and a Bell P-63 Kingcobra, collided mid-air and crashed during the Wings Over Dallas air show at the Dallas Executive Airport in Dallas, Texas, United States; all six occupants died in the crash. The air show, which coincided with Veterans Day commemorations, was organized by the Commemorative Air Force.

Just before the crash, the air boss directed the bomber formation to fly parallel to the spectator viewing line, while the fighters were instructed to enter a trail formation and fly in front of the bombers. According to witnesses, the P-63F executed a high-speed descending banked turn onto the runway approach, colliding with the B-17 and causing both planes to break apart and burst into flames.

The B-17 had a crew of five, while the P-63 had a single occupant. All six died as confirmed by the Dallas County Medical Examiner. Both aircraft were destroyed on impact. The National Transportation Safety Board's (NTSB) preliminary report, released on November 30, highlighted the absence of altitude deconfliction briefings and revealing that the P-63's GPS navigator failed to record any information during the flight, with the ATC audio released on January 12, 2023, confirming no altitude advice was provided.

The NTSB's final report on the accident in December 2024 concluded that the probable cause of the accident was the air boss's and air show event organizer's inadequate prebriefing, relying solely on the air boss's real-time deconfliction directives and the see-and-avoid strategy for collision avoidance, which allowed for the loss of separation between the two aircraft. A contributing cause was a lack of FAA guidance and oversight of air bosses at air shows.

== Aircraft ==
The B-17 involved was Texas Raiders, a Douglas Long Beach–built B-17G-95-DL, aircraft registration number N7227C, which first entered service in 1945 and was operated by American Airpower Heritage Flying Museum. It was one of the few surviving B-17 Flying Fortress aircraft that remained airworthy. The second aircraft involved was a P-63F-1-BE Kingcobra registered N6763, which was also operated by American Airpower Heritage Flying Museum. This plane was one of only two examples of the P-63F variant ever built.

== Accident ==
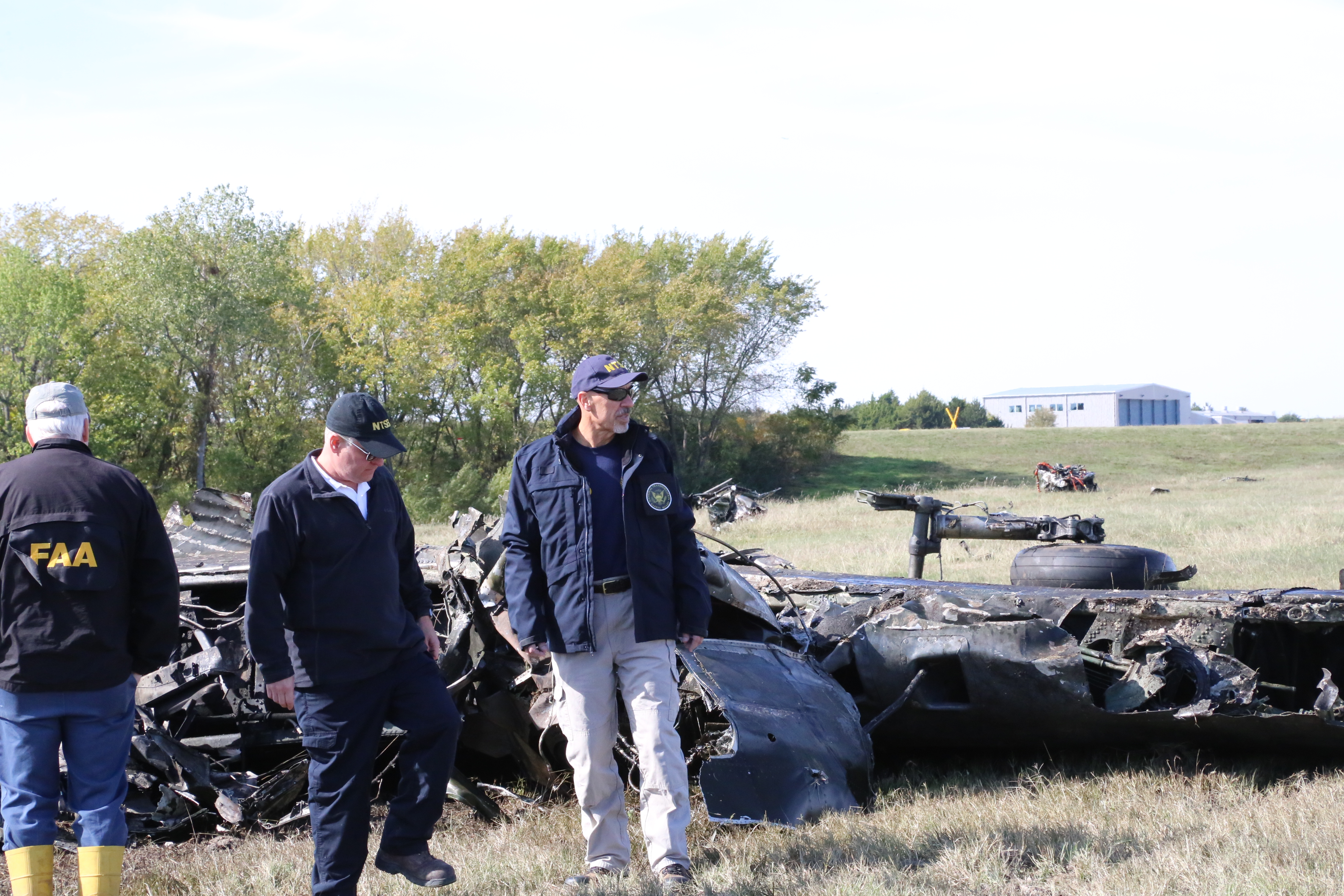
FAA and NTSB personnel at the crash site.

The collision occurred at 1:22 p.m. local time at the Dallas Executive Airport during a Wings Over Dallas air show organized by the Commemorative Air Force, a non-profit organization whose goal is to preserve historic aircraft. The air show, hosted over a commemorative Veteran's Day weekend, had drawn more than 4,000 spectators. Both aircraft were typically piloted by highly trained volunteers, in many cases retired professional pilots. Texas Raiders was the lead aircraft of a five-bomber formation, and the P-63F was the third aircraft of a three-fighter formation.

ADS-B data and recorded radio transmissions reveal that the air boss instructed the bomber formation to follow the 1,000-foot (300 m) show line, which runs parallel to and is situated 1,000 feet away from the spectator viewing line. Concurrently, the fighters were directed to adopt a trail formation—where wingmen fly below and behind the lead aircraft—and advance along the 500-foot (150 m) show line, positioning themselves in front of the bomber formation. The apparent intent, according to a pilot observing the action from the ground, was to put themselves in front of the bomber. According to witness accounts, the P-63F was performing a high-speed descending banked turn onto the runway approach. It collided with the B-17 on the rear port quarter from above, severing the B-17's fuselage from a point just aft of its wings. Both aircraft broke apart and hit the ground seconds afterward, exploding and erupting into flames.

A pilot on the ground, who observed the mid-air collision, speculated that the P-63F pilot might have mistaken one of the trailing bombers for the leader. This misidentification could have led the pilot to believe he had already cleared the bomber formation's flight path. Consequently, he tightened his trajectory and positioned the P-63F's belly towards the bomber line, inadvertently obscuring his view of the approaching B-17.

== Victims ==
All six crew members on board both aircraft were killed, making it the Commemorative Air Force's first fatal accident in 17 years. No injuries or fatalities were reported on the ground. The five fatalities aboard the B-17 were: Terry Michael Barker, Kevin Dimitri "K5" Michels, Daniel Alexander Ragan, Leonard Lloyd "Len" Root and Curtis James Rowe. Craig Stephen Hutain was identified as the sole occupant and pilot of the single-seat Bell P-63.

Terry Barker was a former American Airlines pilot from 1984 to 2020, a former Army helicopter pilot (1975–1978) and former city council member in Keller, Texas. Craig Hutain, the pilot and fatality aboard the Bell P-63, had started flying solo at the age of 17 and was a former commercial pilot for Rocky Mountain Airways (1982–1985) and United Airlines (1985–2022). Hutain started flying as a child with his father, a World War II veteran, and was a pilot for the "Tora! Tora! Tora!" air show, a reenactment of the bombing of Pearl Harbor.

Kevin "K5" Michels, the youngest of the deceased, was an active member of the Commemorative Air Force acting as historian, media representative and tour supervisor for the organization. Len Root was a retired commercial pilot who had flown for American Airlines from 1986 to 2021. Dan Ragan was a U.S. Navy veteran of the Korean War, who served as a radio operator in the 1950s on the naval variant of the B-17, which was designated PB-1W. He lived in Dallas and was a native of Tulsa, Oklahoma. Major Curtis J. Rowe was from Hilliard, Ohio and was a member of the Ohio Wing Civil Air Patrol since 1988.

== Investigation ==
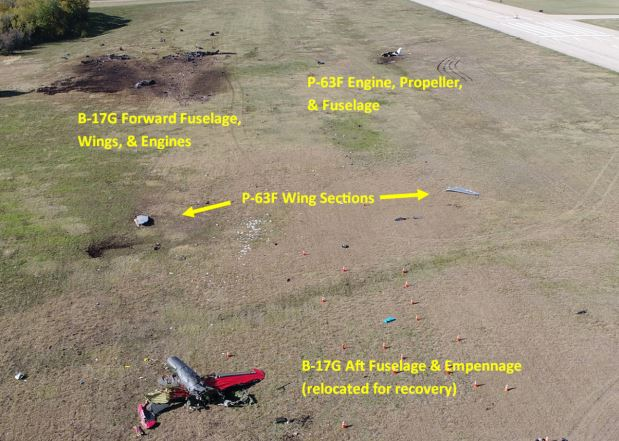
Photograph from Aviation Investigation Preliminary Report by NTSB showing the debris field following the crash

Following the crash, both the Federal Aviation Administration (FAA) and the NTSB launched investigations into the accident. On November 14, the NTSB announced that the wreckage of the P-63 had been moved to a "secure location", while the recovery of the B-17 wreckage was delayed by rain. The NTSB confirmed that neither aircraft was equipped with a flight data recorder, but that a GPS navigator from the P-63 and an electronic flight display from the B-17 had been recovered and were being taken to an NTSB laboratory in Washington, D.C. to be processed for "data and relevant information".

On November 30, the NTSB released a preliminary report. The report noted the lack of "altitude deconflictions briefed before the flight or while the airplanes were in the air". That is, the aircraft were allowed to operate at the same altitude. The report also noted that the GPS navigator in the P-63 did not record any information during the flight. On January 12, 2023, the ATC audio was released indicating that no altitude advice was given to the pilots. The P-63F involved in the accident was known to have compromised visibility from the cockpit due to metal reinforcements.

On March 8, 2024, the NTSB released the full docket on the mid-air collision to the public.

=== Final report ===
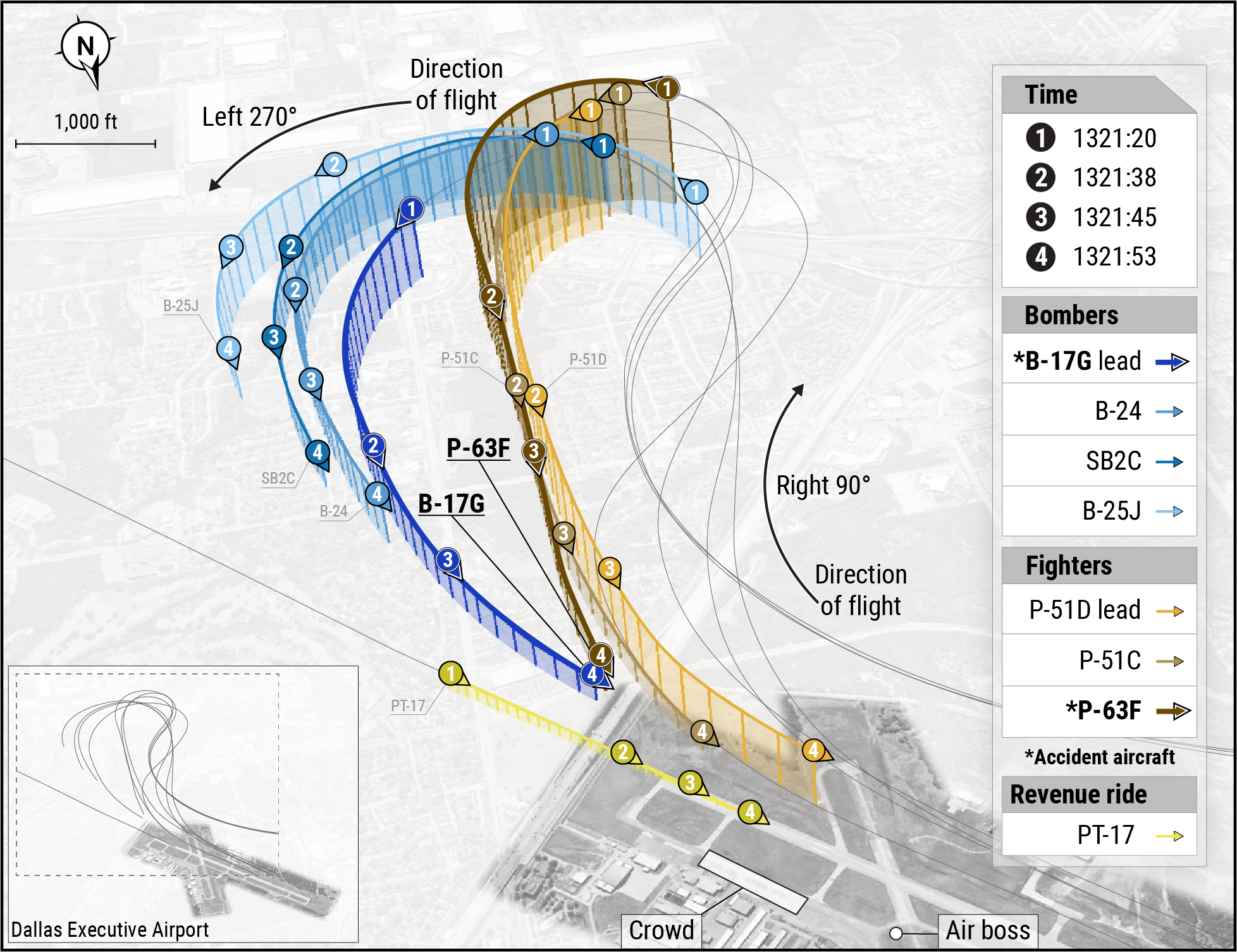
Graphic showing the airplanes' descending flight paths during the final turn before the collision

On December 12, 2024, the NTSB released the final report on the mid-air collision to the public. The report concluded that the probable cause of the accident was the air boss's and air show event organizer's inadequate prebriefing, with the aircraft separation plan for the air show performance relying solely on the air boss's real-time deconfliction directives and the see-and-avoid strategy for collision avoidance, which allowed for the loss of separation between the Boeing B-17G and the Bell P-63F airplanes.

The report cited testimony from four pilots who had participated in Wings Over Houston two weeks before Wings Over Dallas, and voiced safety concerns with "what they felt were 'freeform' directives" by the same air boss during that air show.

The NTSB report identified as other contributing factors to the accident the lack of FAA guidance for air bosses and air show event organizers on developing plans and performing risk assessments that ensure the separation of aircraft that are not part of an approved maneuvers package, and the lack of FAA requirements and guidance for recurrent evaluations of air bosses and direct surveillance of their performance. The report also recommended the development of standard operating procedures for air shows.

== Responses ==
Several Texas officials reacted publicly to the crash. The president of the Commemorative Air Force, which organized the show, said that this kind of mid-air collision during an air show was "extremely rare". The following year, 2023, the Commemorative Air Force's Veteran's Day event was billed as Aviation Discovery Fest and did not include an overhead show.

In August 2023, the widow and children of Lloyd "Len" Root, co-pilot of the B-17, filed a lawsuit against the Commemorative Air Force, who hired and employed the air boss, and American Airpower Heritage Flying Museum Inc. and the American Airpower Heritage Museum Inc., who owned and maintained the aircraft, seeking damages for his death. Family members of others killed in the crash filed two lawsuits against the Commemorative Air Force and the air boss.
