= DWH =

DWH can stand for:

- Domino Web Access, an IBM software product.
- Data warehouse
- Drain water heat recovery
- David Wayne Hooks Memorial Airport
- Deepwater Horizon, oil drilling rig destroyed in an incident that resulted in a large oil spill
