= The Lookalike =

The Lookalike may refer to:

- The Lookalike (1990 film), an American made-for-television thriller film
- The Lookalike (2014 film), an American crime thriller film
