= Airpower Museum =

Airpower Museum may refer to:

- Airpower Museum (Antique Airfield), established in 1965 in Blakesburg, Iowa, U.S.
- American Airpower Heritage Museum, an affiliate organization of the Commemorative Air Force (CAF), headquartered at Dallas Executive Airport in Dallas, Texas, U.S.
- American Airpower Museum, established in 1998 at Republic Airport in East Farmingdale, New York, U.S.
- CAF Airpower Museum, formerly located in Midland, Texas, U.S. (1991–2015)

== See also ==
- Aviation museum
  - List of aerospace museums
- National Air and Space Museum, Washington, D.C, U.S.
- Imperial War Museum Duxford, Cambridgeshire, England
