= Dallas Airport =

Dallas Airport can refer to several airports in Dallas, Texas:

- Dallas/Fort Worth International Airport (IATA: DFW; ICAO: KDFW)
- Dallas Love Field (IATA: DAL; ICAO: KDAL)
- Dallas Executive Airport (IATA: RBD; ICAO: KRBD)
- Naval Air Station Dallas
