= Midland Army Air Field Museum =

- Location within Texas
- Established: 2015
- Location: Midland, Texas
- Coordinates: 31.9419°N 102.2148°W
- Type: Aviation museum
- Website: www.highskywing.org/page_id=3699

The Midland Army Air Field Museum is an aviation museum located at the Midland International Air and Space Port in Midland, Texas operated by the High Sky Wing of the Commemorative Air Force and focused on the history of Midland Army Airfield.

== History ==
=== Background ===
In December 1991, the then Confederate Air Force moved its headquarters from Harlingen to Midland. At the same time, the American Airpower Heritage Museum was established to manage the organizations artifacts. When the organization moved its headquarters to Dallas in 2015 the museum was moved as well and renamed the National Aviation Education Center.

=== Establishment ===
The move left the facility with no museum and so the High Sky Wing, which remained at the airport, established the Midland Army Air Field Museum. The museum broke ground in August 2015 and opened on 6 February 2016.

== Facilities ==
A memorial garden is located next to the museum.

== Collection ==
=== Airworthy aircraft ===
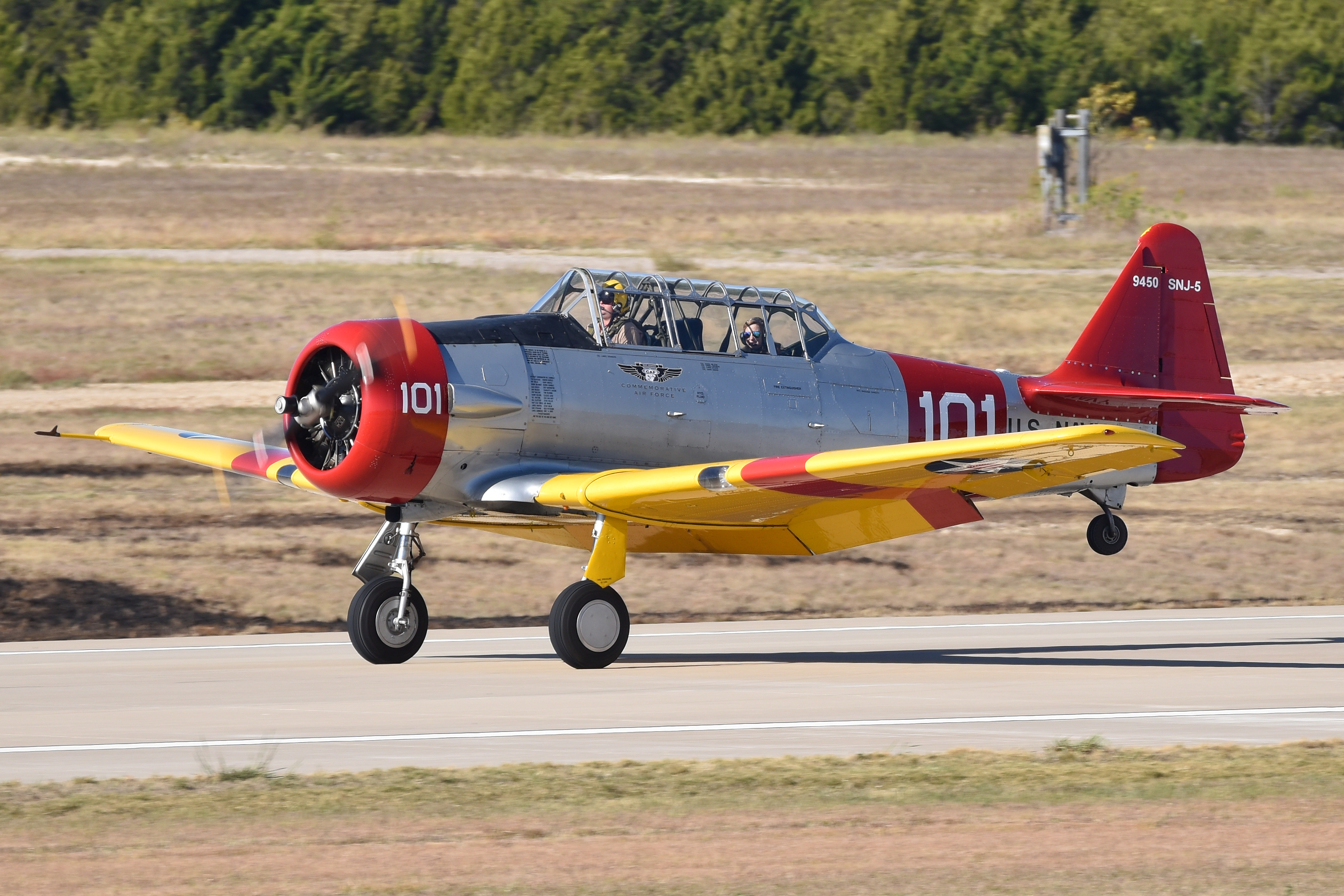
North American SNJ-5

The airworthy aircraft in the collection are operated by the High Sky Wing:

- Beechcraft D18S
- Fairchild PT-19
- North American SNJ-5
- North American T-28A Trojan
- Ryan Navion A
- Stinson L-5 Sentinel

=== Aircraft on display ===
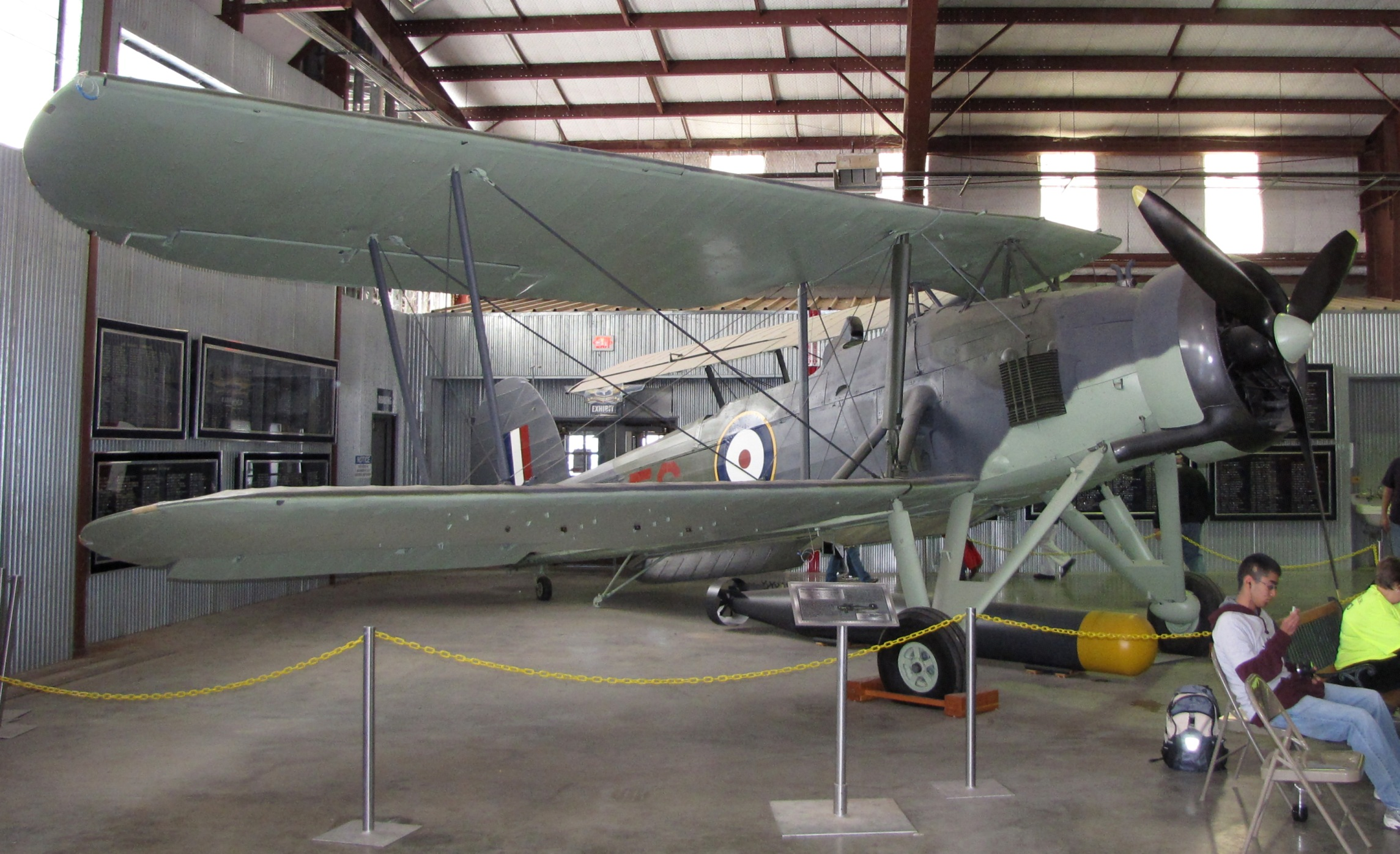
Fairey Swordfish

- Bell AH-1S Cobra
- Bell UH-1H Iroquois
- Douglas C-54D Skymaster – cockpit only
- Fairey Swordfish IV
- Grumman F-14A Tomcat
- General Dynamics F-111E Aardvark
- Lockheed PV-2D Harpoon
- McDonnell Douglas F-4E Phantom II
- North American F-100A Super Sabre
- Republic F-105D Thunderchief
- Schweizer TG-3A
- Shenyang J-5

== Events ==
The High Sky Wing holds the annual AIRSHO event, a continuation from when it was the headquarters of the Commemorative Air Force. It also holds two annual fundraisers, Hops & Props and Wine and Warbirds, the former also a holdover from before the museum.

== Programs ==
The High Sky Wing offers rides in five of their aircraft.

== See also ==
- List of aviation museums
