= CXO =

CXO may refer to:

- Chandra X-ray Observatory, a satellite launched by NASA in 1999
- Chief experience officer, a corporate officer responsible for the overall user experience of an organization
- CxO (chief x officer), also called C-suite, a generic term for any corporate officer
- CrossOver (software), a commercial version of WINE which runs Windows applications on Linux, Mac OS X and Solaris
- Conroe-North Houston Regional Airport, the airport in Conroe, Texas, United States (IATA code)
- Nate CXO, an American record producer.
