= Frances Lee McCain =

American actress

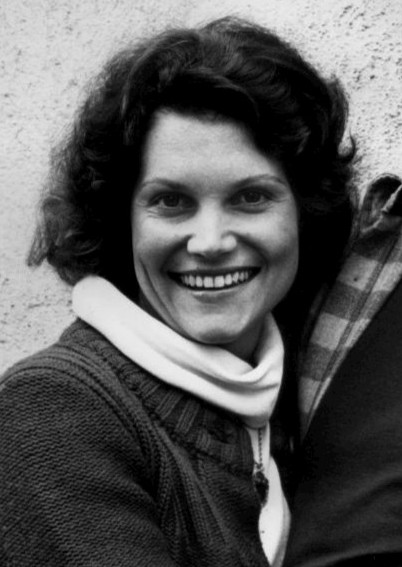
- McCain in 1977
- Other name: Lee McCain
- Occupation: Actress
- Years active: 1969–present

Frances Lee McCain is an American actress.

== Early life and education ==
McCain graduated from Ripon College with a BA in Philosophy and then studied acting at the Central School of Speech and Drama in London, England.

== Career ==
She returned to New York City where she appeared on Broadway in Woody Allen's Play it Again Sam, and off-Broadway in Lanford Wilson's Lemon Sky, creating the role of Carol. She joined the American Conservatory Theater in San Francisco under William Ball and played a variety of roles in repertory.

=== Apple's Way TV series (1974–1975) and other 1970s work ===
She began her career in film and television after appearing opposite Jon Voight and Faye Dunaway in A Streetcar Named Desire, eventually co-starring with Ronny Cox as the female lead in the television series, CBS-TV's Apple's Way in 1974. She appeared in a variety of television series and miniseries through the 1970s, including Washington: Behind Closed Doors and the Quincy, M.E. episode Eye of the Needle playing a Holistic practitioner, and in "The Rockford Files" 1978 episode "The Prisoner of Rosemont Hall." In 1979, she appeared in Real Life. In 1979, she appeared on ABC in the television series 13 Queens Boulevard.

=== 1980s acting work ===
In the 1980s, she was cast in several major films, usually playing the mother of a main character. In 1984, she co-starred in the film Gremlins as Lynn Peltzer, the mother of main character Billy Peltzer. Also that year, she played Ethel McCormack, the mother of Ren McCormack (Kevin Bacon), in the musical film Footloose. In 1985, she appeared in the film Back to the Future as Stella Baines, the mother of Lorraine Baines (Lea Thompson). In 1986, she played Mrs. Lachance, the mother of Gordie Lachance (Wil Wheaton), in the drama film Stand by Me.

=== Later work ===
McCain continued to work in television after relocating to the San Francisco Bay Area in the late 1980s and also appeared in Scream (1996), as the mother of Rose McGowan and David Arquette's characters, and Patch Adams (1998).

== Filmography ==
=== Film ===
Year	Title	Role	Notes
1973	The Laughing Policeman	Prostitute	
1979	Real Life	Jeanette Yeager	
1981	Honky Tonk Freeway	Claire Calo	
1982	Tex	Mrs. Johnson	
1984	Footloose	Ethel McCormack	
1984	Gremlins	Lynn Peltzer	
1985	Back to the Future	Stella Baines	
1986	Murder in Three Acts	Miss Milray	
1986	Stand by Me	Mrs. Lachance	
1988	It Takes Two	Joyce Rogers	
1996	Scream	Mrs. Riley	
1998	Patch Adams	Judy	
1999	True Crime	Mrs. Lowenstein	
2018	Ideal Home	Doris	
2019	Dreamland	Teller	
2020	The Comeback Trail	Marge (Old Actress)	
2022	End of the Road	Val	

=== Television ===
Year	Title	Role	Notes
1973	The Mod Squad	Alice	Episode: "And Once for My Baby"
1973	Owen Marshall, Counselor at Law	Gina	Episode: "The Second Victim"
1974	The New Perry Mason	Laurie Haden	Episode: "The Case of the Violent Valley"
1974–1975	Apple's Way	Barbara Apple	Series regular; 28 episodes
1975	Doctors' Hospital	Annie Robaire	Episode: "But Who Will Bless Thy Daughter Norah?"
1975	The Bob Newhart Show	Janet	Episode: "A Matter of Vice-Principal"
1976	Visions	Jenny	Episode: "The War Widow"
1977	The Trial of Lee Harvey Oswald	Jan Holder	TV Movie
1978	The Rockford Files	Leslie Callahan	Episode: "The Prisoner of Rosemont Hall"
1978	Lou Grant	Susan Sherman	Episodes: "Romance", "Singles"
1981	Three's Company	Kelly	Episode: "And Baby Makes Four"
1985	The Rape of Richard Beck	Caroline Beck	TV Movie
1986	A Fighting Choice	Virginia Hagan	TV Movie
1986	Can You Feel Me Dancing?	Joan Nichols	TV Movie
1987	At Mother's Request	Louise	2 episodes
1987	Police Story	Claire Wright	Episode: The Freeway Killings
1988	Hunter	Sara Devane	Episode: "Girl on the Beach"
1988	Scandal in a Small Town	Gwendolyn	TV Movie
1988	Leap of Faith	Susan	TV Movie
1989	HeartBeat	Samantha Flemming	Episode: "Baby, Maybe"
1990	The Lookalike	Dr. Stamos	TV Movie
1991	Father Dowling Investigates	Helen Austin	Episode: The Mummy's Curse Mystery
1993	Poisoned by Love: The Kern County Murders	Bea Emory	TV Movie
1993	Firestorm: 72 Hours In Oakland	Flo	TV Movie
1993	Dying to Love You	Sue Graham	TV Movie
1993	Diagnosis Murder	Monica Walters	Episode: "The 13 Million Dollar Man"
1993–1994	Second Chances	Felicity Cook	3 episodes
2016	Preacher	Mosie	3 episodes
2017	Midnight, Texas	Janice	Episode: "Last Temptation of Midnight"
2017	The Girlfriend Experience	Sandra	7 episodes
2020	Messiah	Patty	Episode: "So That Seeing They May Not See"
2020	Better Call Saul	Judge Chapek	Episode: "Namaste"
