= Bo Brinkman =

American director and actor (born 1956)

- Born: Chester Harry Brinkman III; September 17, 1956 (age 69); Pasadena, Texas, U.S.
- Occupations: Director; producer; actor
- Years active: 1985–present
- Spouses: Valerie Helene Service (m. 1979; div. 1980) Melissa Gilbert (m. 1988; div. 1994)
- Children: 1
- Relatives: Dennis Quaid (cousin); Randy Quaid (cousin); Sharon Tate (cousin)

Bo Brinkman is an American director, film producer, and actor. He is known for portraying Major Walter H. Taylor, the aide-de-camp for General Robert E. Lee, in the film Gettysburg and its prequel Gods and Generals.

He wrote the film Last Man Club in 1995 to honor his father's service in World War II, which was finally released in 2016 after overcoming significant hurdles. In the spring of 2024, he taught a filmmaking course at Gettysburg College. During filming of his latest project, Gettysburg 1863, on Baltimore Street in Gettysburg, many noted on social media that a window air conditioning unit was left in view of the set, however Brinkman assures that the unit will not appear in the film.

Brinkman was married to actress Melissa Gilbert from 1988–1994, with whom he has a son, Dakota.

== Filmography ==
Year	Title	Role	Notes
1985	The Equalizer	Sonny	Episode: "Mama's Boy"
1989	Ice House	Pake	Writer, Producer
1990	Bail Jumper	Steve	
1990	The Lookalike	Stuart	
1993	Gettysburg	Maj. Walter H. Taylor	
1996	An Occasional Hell	Trooper Brown	
1997	Laws of Deception	J.W.	Co-producer
2001	The Way She Moves	Danny	
2002	The Last Man Club		Short film; Director, Writer
2003	Gods and Generals	Maj. Walter H. Taylor	
2003	The Face of the Serpent	Branch	Producer
2009	Fish Mich		Director
2011	Life with the Meadows		Director; Episode: "We Have a Client"
2012	The Last Mark	Harry	Director, Writer, Producer
2016	Last Man Club		Director, Writer, Producer
2017	Swing State	Sergeant Bo Regards	
2021	The Shipment		Associate Producer
2022	The Bay House		Director, Writer, Producer
2023	A Gettysburg Christmas		Director, Writer, Producer
TBA	Gettysburg 1863	—N/a	Director, Writer, Producer; Filming
