= The Lookalike (1990 film) =

- VHS cover
- Genre: Mystery thriller
- Based on: "The Look Alike" by Kate Wilhelm
- Teleplay by: Linda Bergman; Martin Tahse
- Directed by: Gary Nelson
- Starring: Melissa Gilbert-Brinkman; Diane Ladd; Frances Lee McCain; Jason Scott Lee; Thaao Penghlis
- Music by: Allyn Ferguson
- Country of origin: United States
- Original language: English

Production
- Producer: Lillian Gallo
- Cinematography: Neil Roach
- Editor: Donald R. Rode
- Running time: 100 minutes
- Production companies: Gallo Entertainment; MCA Television Entertainment

Original release
- Network: USA Network
- Release: December 12, 1990

The Lookalike is a 1990 American mystery thriller television film directed by Gary Nelson, based on the short story by Kate Wilhelm, and starring Melissa Gilbert-Brinkman, Diane Ladd, Frances Lee McCain, Jason Scott Lee, and Thaao Penghlis. It premiered on USA Network on December 12, 1990 and was released on VHS in 1991.

== Plot ==
Melissa Gilbert stars as a woman grieving about her child who she lost in an accident, when she one day recognizes her daughter in a girl.

== Cast ==
- Melissa Gilbert-Brinkman as Gina/Jennifer
- Diane Ladd as Mary Helen Needam
- Frances Lee McCain as Dr. Stamos
- Jason Scott Lee as John "Charlie" Chan
- Thaao Penghlis as Nikos Lissandros
- Bo Brinkman as Stuart
- April Stevens as Young Gina, Jennifer and Sarah
- C.K. Bibby as Jack Needam
