= David Wayne Hooks Memorial Airport =

Coordinates: 30°03′43″N 095°33′10″W

- IATA: DWH; ICAO: KDWH; FAA LID: DWH

Summary
- Airport type: Public-use, privately owned
- Owner: Northwest Airport Management, LP
- Serves: Houston, Texas
- Location: Harris County, Texas
- Elevation AMSL: 152 ft (46 m)
- Website: www.hooksairport.com

Map
- Location of airport in Texas DWH (the United States)

Runways
Direction	Length		Surface
Direction	ft	m	Surface
17R/35L	7,009	2,136	Concrete
17L/35R	3,447	1,067	Concrete
17W/35W	2,530	771	Water

Statistics (2022)
- Aircraft operations: 152,198
- Based aircraft: 136
- Source: Federal Aviation Administration

David Wayne Hooks Memorial Airport (IATA: DWH, ICAO: KDWH, FAA LID: DWH) is a public-use airport located near the city of Tomball in unincorporated Harris County, Texas. It is 23 miles (37 km) northwest of the central business district of Houston. It is the busiest general aviation airport in Texas and one of the busiest general aviation airports in the United States. The airport is privately owned by Northwest Airport Management, LP.

The airport is notable because it is one of only a few privately owned airports with a Federal Aviation Administration control tower; the airport is owned by Northwest Airport Management, LP and managed by Amy Mounger and Alex Membreno.

On June 27, 2007, The Texas State Legislature approved Tomball's request to annex Hooks Airport even though the airport does not border the Tomball city limits. Since the airport is in the city of Houston's extraterritorial jurisdiction, the city of Tomball must get permission from Houston to annex the airport. As of 2010, the annexation still has not been finalized.

== Facilities and aircraft ==
David Wayne Hooks Memorial Airport covers an area of 480 acres (190 ha) which contains two asphalt paved runways: 17R/35L measuring 7,009 x 100 ft (2,136 x 30 m). and 17L/35R measuring 3,447 x 35 ft (1,067 x 11 m). It also has a seaplane landing area designated as runway 17W/35W which is 2,530 x 100 ft (771 x 30 m).

For the 12-month period ending December 31, 2022, the airport had 152,198 aircraft operations, an average of 417 per day: 97% general aviation, 2% air taxi, <1% commercial, and <1% military. There were 136 aircraft based at this airport: 117 single-engine, 14 multi-engine, and 5 jet.

Facilities include:

- The main Gill Aviation terminal
- The Aviator Grill is a locally owned and operated restaurant connected to the Gill Aviation terminal which has views of the main ramps and runway 17R.
- Helicopter Services Inc.
- Memorial Hermann Life Flight operates its North Base on Tower Road. They maintain an EC-145 and aircrew quarters from which they provide both VFR and IFR helicopter air ambulance services 24/7.
- Sunrise Helicopter, Inc.

The airport also includes a number of flight schools, including Texas Flight, The Flight School and United Flight Systems.

The airport was also previously a local favorite for its diverse mix of aircraft and openness. However, as of March 2012, citing safety concerns from pilots, barbed wire fencing went up around the airport, sealing off the previously popular observation areas and leaving only the inside of Aviator's Grill as the sole observation area for the public.

The small circular lake at the north end of the airport is 'Lake Transit' and the island in the lake center is 'Pinnacle Island'.

== History ==
The Airport started when Charles Hooks built a runway for his own personal use. His hobby eventually became a business, and he subsequently built a runway and a main terminal building. It was first opened for public use in the 1960s. Shortly after its opening, Hooks' son, David, was killed in the crash of a small plane that he was piloting under the supervision of a flight instructor. All four people on the plane were killed. David was 15 years old at the time of his death. The airport's name was changed from Houston Northwest Airport to David Wayne Hooks Memorial Airport in his memory.

Until the 1980s, the airport was run and maintained by Hooks, and his wife Irma. Upon the death of Mrs. Hooks, her daughter stepped in and helped with its operation.

In 1989, Charles Hooks retired and sold the airport to the Gill Family.

In 2009 a fire occurred at the airport. A man was burned, and several aircraft were destroyed.

On June 26, 2010, another fire occurred at the airport, destroying another large hangar. One helicopter and several aircraft components were destroyed.

In early 2010, Hooks Airport received a notable resident when the B-17G Flying Fortress 'Texas Raiders' was permanently moved from William P. Hobby Airport to a spacious hangar in the Tomball Jet Center as a cost-saving measure. 'Texas Raiders' used Hooks Airport as her base of operations for the 2010 air show season and several years afterward. The heavy bomber relocated again in March 2017 to General Aviation Services at Conroe-North Houston Regional Airport in Conroe, Texas.

== See also ==
- List of airports in Texas
