= Antique aircraft =

Preserved obsolete aircraft

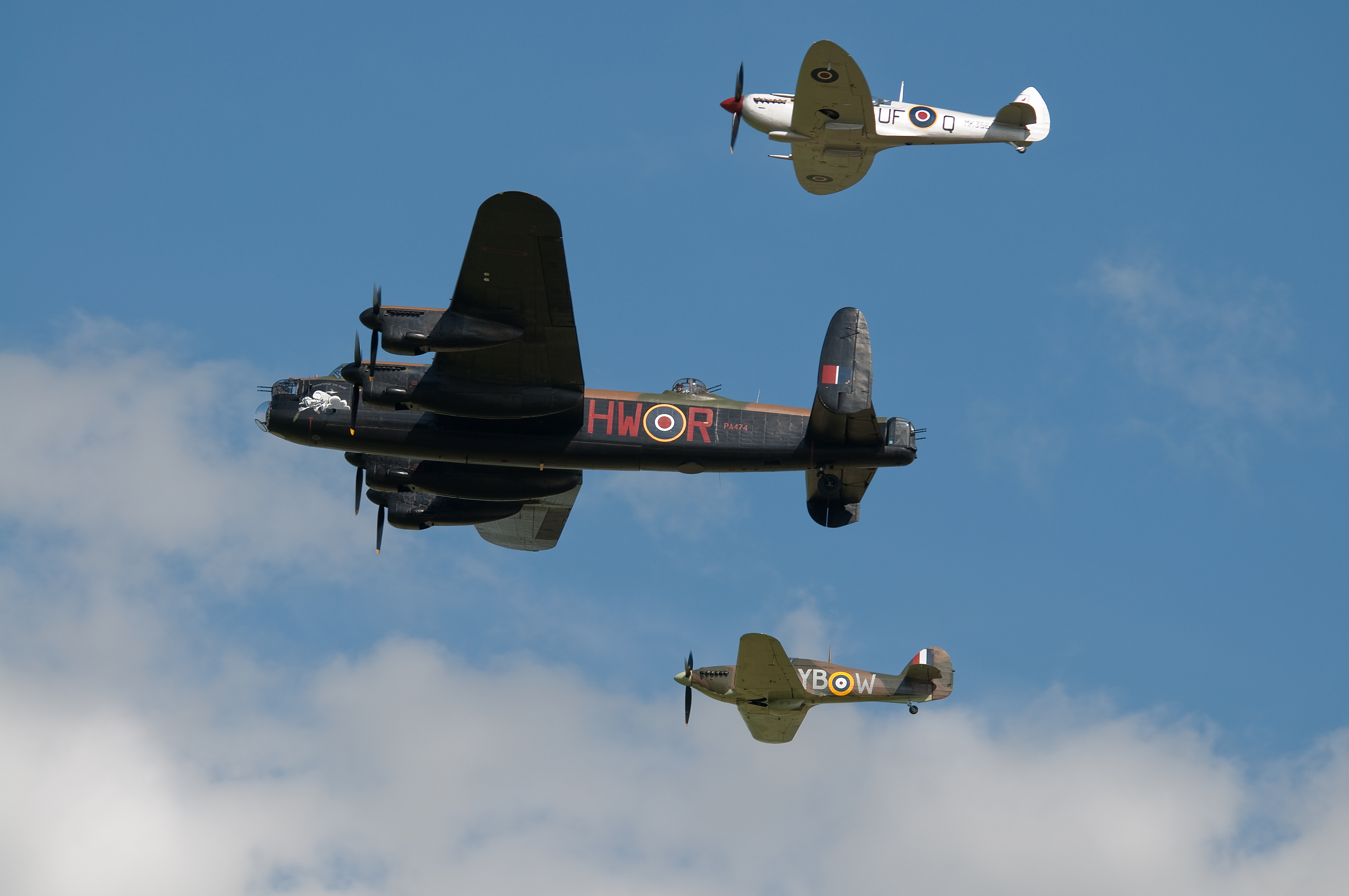
Battle of Britain Memorial Flight

Antique, classic, heritage, historic, veteran or vintage aircraft are aircraft of an obsolete type which have been preserved beyond their normal life. Their owners are typically aviation museums, armed forces or private enthusiasts. Sometimes they may be maintained in an airworthy condition so that they can be flown at air displays or on public occasions.

For example, the Battle of Britain Memorial Flight maintained by the United Kingdom's Royal Air Force (RAF) consists of RAF aircraft from World War II, and regularly takes part in official celebrations, such as its flypast at the wedding of Prince William and Catherine Middleton in 2011—over 65 years after the aircraft were constructed. The oldest airworthy aircraft in 2016 was a 1909 Blériot XI in the Shuttleworth Collection.

Organizations devoted to such aircraft include the Antique Airplane Association, the Historic Aircraft Association and the Vintage Aircraft Association.

== See also ==
- Gate guardian
- Warbird
