= Conroe-North Houston Regional Airport =

Airport in Texas, United States

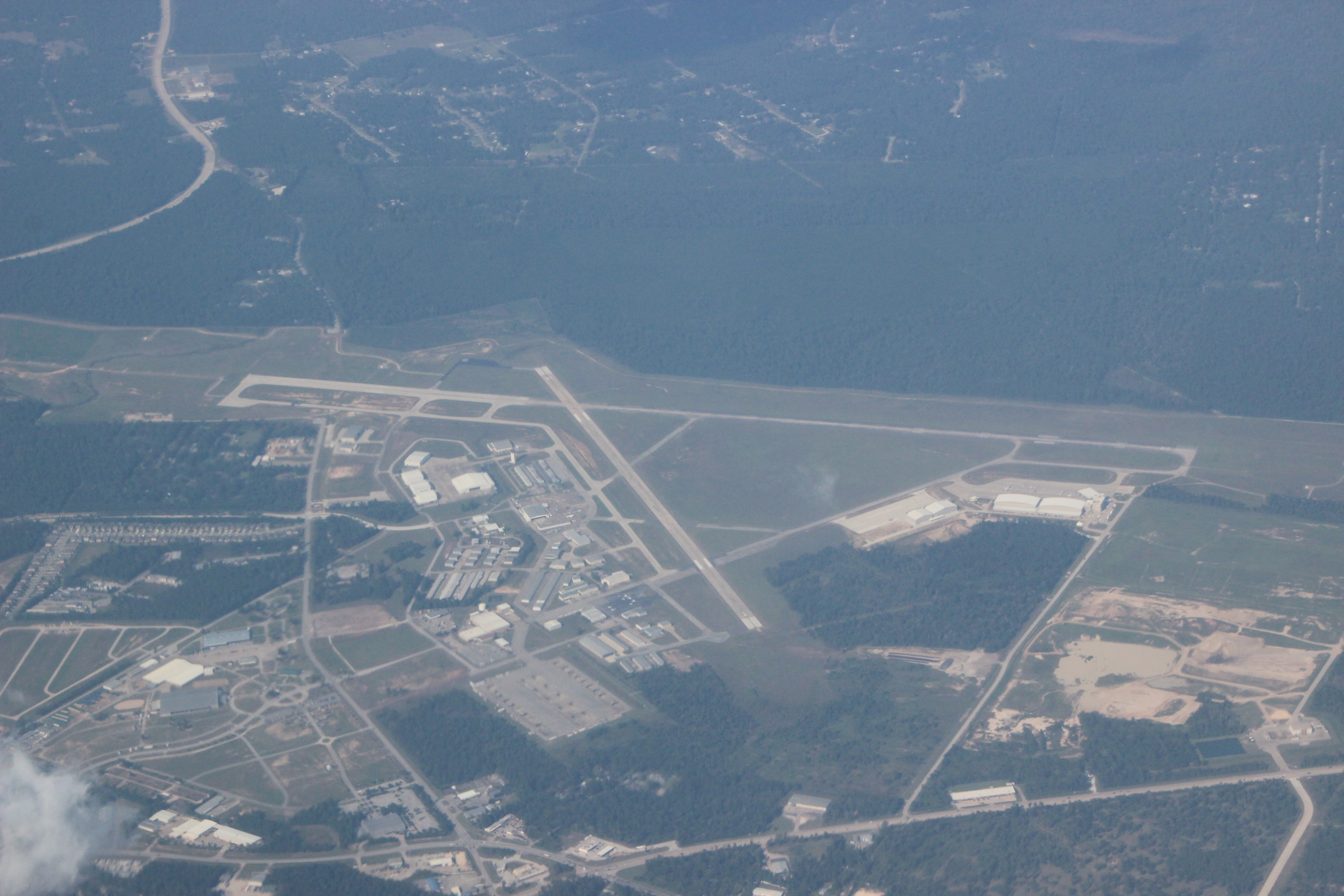
- Aerial view of the airport looking northeastwards
- IATA: CXO; ICAO: KCXO; FAA LID: CXO

Summary
- Airport type: Public
- Owner: Montgomery County
- Serves: Houston, Texas
- Location: Conroe, Texas
- Elevation AMSL: 245 ft (75 m)
- Coordinates: 30°21′09″N 095°24′52″W
- Website: flycxo.com

Map
- Location of airport in Texas CXO (the United States)

Runways
Direction	Length		Surface
Direction	ft	m	Surface
14/32	7,501	2,286	Concrete
1/19	5,000	1,524	Concrete

Statistics (2023)
- Aircraft operations (year ending 4/10/2023): 119,472
- Based aircraft: 229
- Sources: airport web site and FAA

Conroe-North Houston Regional Airport (IATA: CXO, ICAO: KCXO, FAA LID: CXO) (formerly known as Lone Star Executive Airport and Montgomery County Airport) is a public-use airport in Conroe, Texas, United States, 37 miles (60 km) north of the central business district of Houston. It is publicly owned by Montgomery County.

== History ==
Conroe-North Houston Regional Airport was constructed during World War II to serve as a military facility, but was converted in 1945 to be a predominantly civilian airfield.

== Facilities ==
Conroe-North Houston Regional Airport covers an area of 1,346 acres (545 ha) which contains two concrete runways: 14/32 with dimensions of 7,501 x 150 ft (2,286 x 46 m); and 1/19 of 5,000 x 100 ft (1,524 x 30 m).

For the 12-month period ending April 10, 2023, the airport had 119,472 aircraft operations, an average of 327 per day: 96% general aviation, 1% military and 3% air taxi. At that time there were 229 aircraft based at this airport: 143 single-engine, 25 multi-engine, 28 jet, 8 helicopter, 1 glider, and 24 military.

There are currently two fixed-base operators at the airport; Galaxy FBO & General Aviation Jet Center .

U.S. Customs and Border Protection has operated an inspection station for international flights at this airport since September 2016.

The United States Army maintains a base at the airport, called the Conroe United States Army Reserve Center. The 1st Battalion, 158th Aviation Regiment is stationed at the base.

== Accidents and incidents ==
- On April 30, 1988, Cessna Bird Dog N3946L was destroyed following a crash on takeoff from Runway 01. After the conclusion of a local airshow, the pilot (also a flight instructor for the Conroe FBO General Aviation Services) occupied the front seat and executed a maximum performance chandelle over the runway and stalled at low altitude. The aircraft impacted the runway almost vertically and was consumed by post-crash fire. The pilot, Carl A. Pickering III, was killed and his passenger, who was trapped in the burning wreckage, suffered disfiguring burns over his whole body. The pilot had performed the same maneuver during the airshow but at that time the plane was much lighter as he was the sole occupant and the plane was carrying minimum fuel. A road on the airport grounds is named in his memory.
- On September 16, 1990, Lockheed PV2 "Fat Cat" N7428C, caught fire and was destroyed during taxi operations prior to departing for Lafayette Regional Airport KLFT. All four occupants evacuated safely. It was determined that the right engine starter solenoid failed to open after engine start and continued to be driven by the engine until it overheated and caught fire. Due to its location near fuel, oil, and hydraulic lines, the fire quickly spread throughout the engine nacelle and right wing, igniting a main fuel tank. At the time there was no on-site emergency personnel or equipment so the fire went uncontrolled for some time and the aircraft was a total loss.
- In the early morning hours of June 12, 1994, a fire destroyed the hangar and offices of the FBO General Aviation Services. The hangar, built by the US Navy in 1943, was the largest structure on the airport at the time. The fire destroyed 19 airplanes including 11 warbirds. While suspicious circumstances surrounded the fire, it was determined that faulty wiring was the cause, as much of the original wiring was still in use.
- On June 20, 1996, Douglas DC-3A N23WT of Loren Davis Ministries International was destroyed in a crash at Cut and Shoot, Texas. The aircraft was on a training flight from Conroe Airport when an engine failure occurred. The co-pilot did not hear the call to feather the propeller on the affected engine. The aircraft flew into a tree, hit power lines and was destroyed in the subsequent fire. A witness stated that the aircraft was lifted off with insufficient airspeed. The crew also attempted to fly the aircraft at an incorrect airspeed following the engine failure.
- On September 19, 2014, a NetJets-operated Embraer Phenom 300 arriving from Nashville International Airport slid off the runway. The area had recently been inundated by the remains of Hurricane Odile. Neither the pilot nor the co-pilot were hurt.

== See also ==
- List of airports in Texas
