= Commemorative Air Force =

Nonprofit organization for preserving aircraft

- Abbreviation: CAF
- Formation: 6 September 1961
- Type: Non-profit organization
- Location: Dallas, Texas
- Coordinates: 32°40′38″N 96°51′39″W
- Members: 13,000
- Website: commemorativeairforce.org
- Formerly called: Confederate Air Force

The Commemorative Air Force (CAF), formerly known as the Confederate Air Force, is an American non-profit organization based in Dallas, Texas, that preserves and shows historical aircraft at airshows, primarily in the U.S. and Canada.

The CAF has about 13,000 members, more than 70 chapters, and more than 170 aircraft, including the world's largest collection of airworthy warbirds.

== History ==
In 1951, Lloyd Nolen purchased a P-40 for $1500 in Phoenix, and flew it back to the Mercedes airstrip. Resolving, "...if it were humanly possible, at least one of each of the great American fighter planes would be found, restored and preserved in flying condition. Out of this resolution came the Ghost Squadron – the Confederate Air Force: rebels with the cause of preserving a small part of our American aviation heritage." Eventually, "the tongue-in-cheek Semper Mint Julep and was now replaced with Flying Museum," as the air force grew.

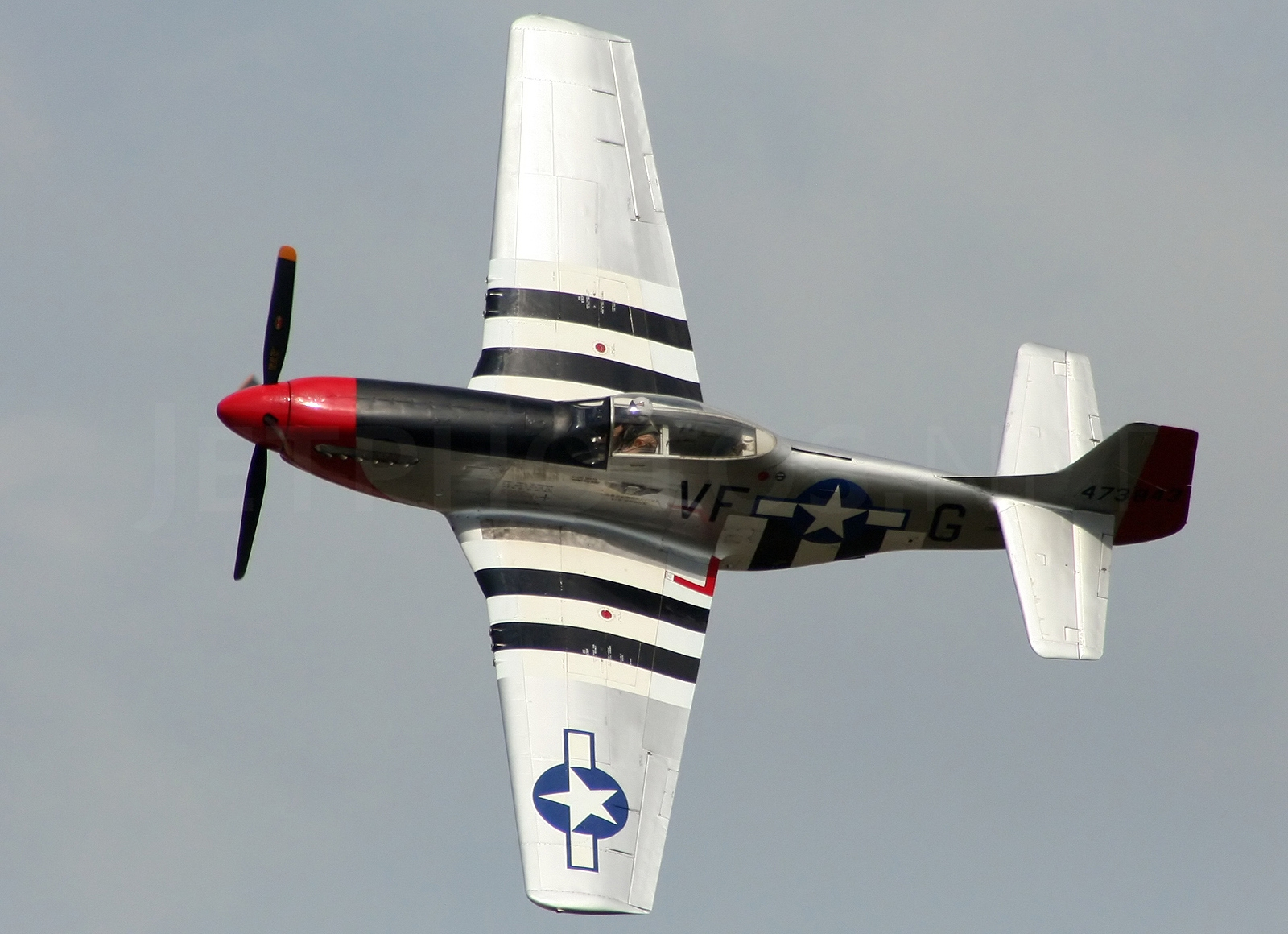
The P-51D "Red Nose" was the first airplane of the CAF.

In 1957, Lloyd Nolen and four friends purchased a P-51 Mustang called "Red Nose", splitting the $1,500 cost, and selling the P-40. In 1958, the group made their second purchase, a Grumman F8F Bearcat for $805. Both planes then participated in their first airshow at Naval Air Station Kingsville.

On September 6, 1961, the CAF was chartered as a nonprofit Texas corporation to restore and preserve World War II-era combat aircraft. By the end of the year, the CAF owned nine aircraft. By 1963, the group had achieved their initial goal of acquiring one of each fighter plane operated by U.S. forces during World War II.

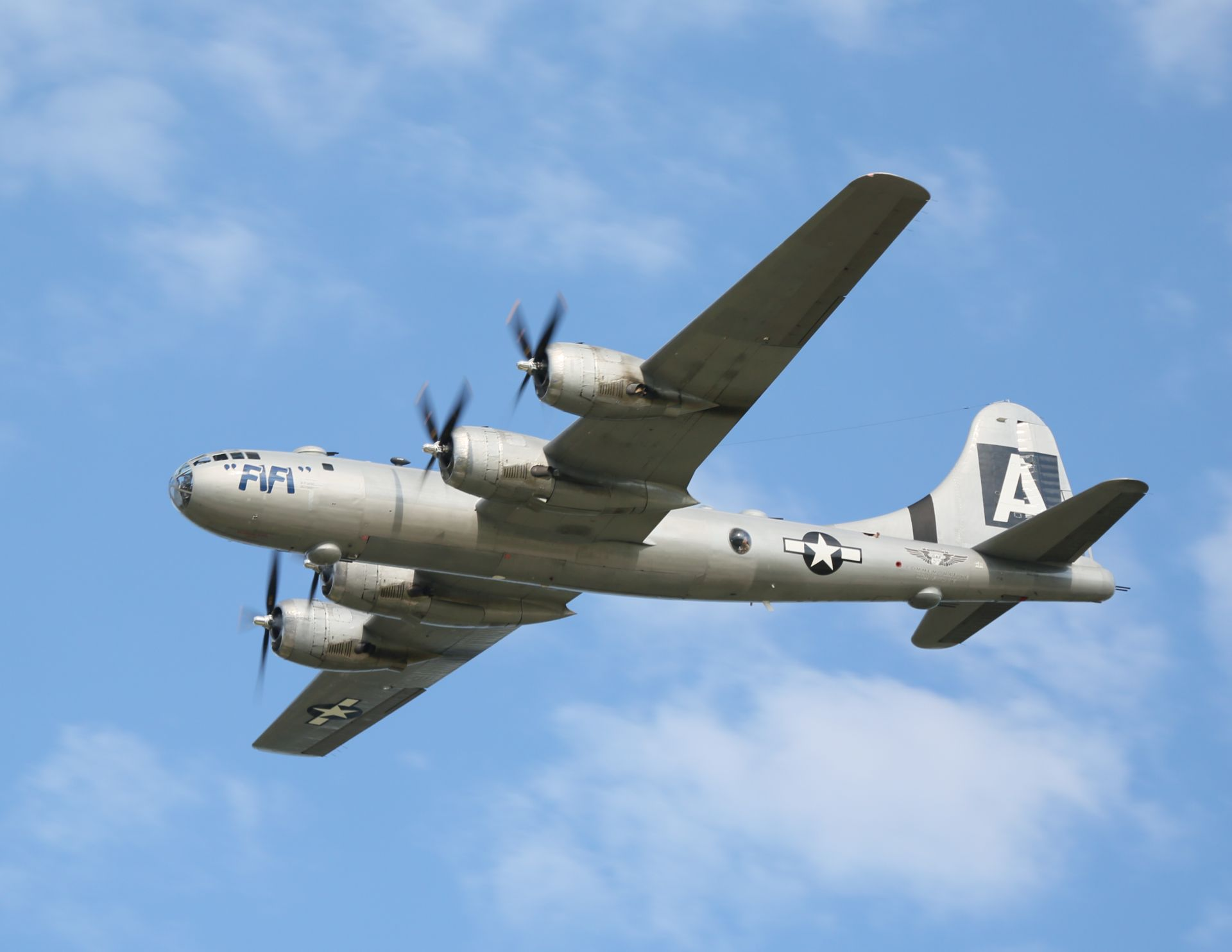
The CAF added the B-29 FIFI in the 1970s.

In 1965, the first museum building was completed at old Rebel Field, Mercedes, Texas. The CAF created a new Rebel Field at Harlingen Industrial Airport in Harlingen, Texas, and moved there in 1968, occupying three large buildings including 26,000 square feet (2,400 m^{2}) of museum space. By the end of the decade, the CAF fleet had added medium and heavy bombers such as the North American B-25 Mitchell, B-17, Consolidated B-24 Liberator.

In 1976, the CAF sponsored an air show in Harlingen, Texas in which a B-29 bomber piloted by Paul Tibbets, the pilot who flew the B-29 which bombed Hiroshima during World War II, reenacted the atomic bombing of Hiroshima (including a mock mushroom cloud). This air show prompted the Japanese government to lodge a formal complaint with the United States Embassy, resulting in the U.S. government issuing an apology.

In 1983, the American Airpower Heritage Foundation was founded to financially support the CAF.

The group's accomplishments were recognized in 1989 with a National Aviation Hall of Fame Spirit of Flight Award. That year, Texas Governor William Clements signed a resolution designating the CAF the air force of Texas.

In 1990, the CAF added two corporations. The first was the American Airpower Heritage Flying Museum, tasked with obtaining and maintaining the CAF's aircraft titles. The second was the American Airpower Heritage Museum, which acquired and maintained the CAF's non-aircraft pieces and static displays. In September 1990, CAF joined a statewide anti-littering campaign, filming a low-level, high-speed pass of the B-17 Sentimental Journey on a mock bombing run of a highway-littering pickup truck, as part of a 30-second television spot.

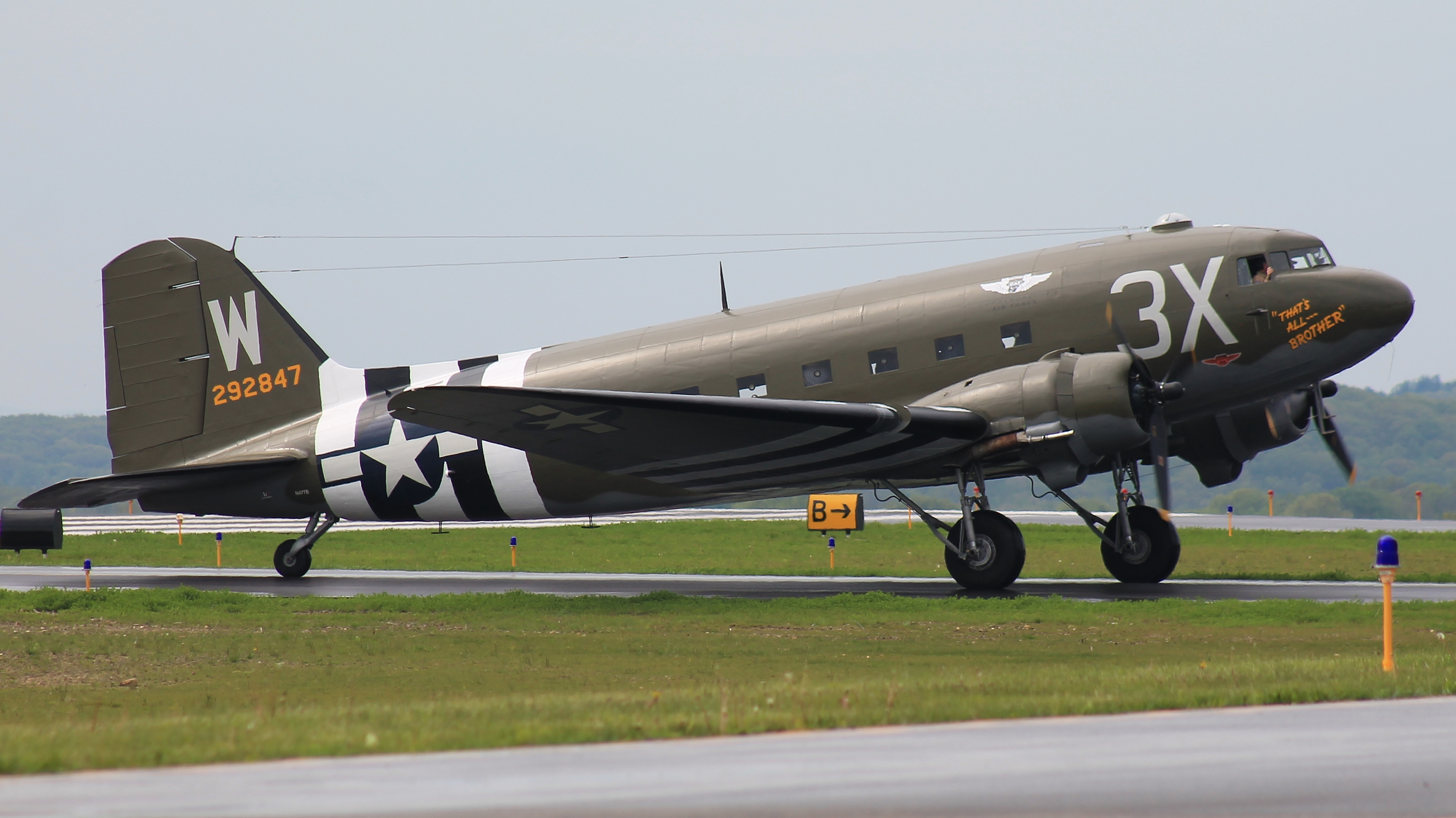
The CAF C-47 That's All, Brother was the plane that led the parachute assault on Normandy during D-Day.

In 1991, the CAF moved operations to Midland, Texas, where the group opened the CAF Airpower Museum and the American Combat Airman Hall of Fame.

In April 2014, the CAF announced the move of their headquarters and all of the planes associated with the headquarters to Dallas Executive Airport in Dallas, Texas. The museum and its artifacts (including the nose art collection) were moved to the new headquarters, which it operates as the Henry B. Tippie National Aviation Education Center.

In 2015, the CAF acquired the C-47 That's All, Brother, the plane that led the parachute assault on Normandy during D-Day.

=== Name ===
In November 2000, the group voted to rename, using the initials "CAF" until a permanent name was selected. Following a 2001 membership vote, the group changed its name to "Commemorative Air Force", effective January 1, 2002. Many felt the name Confederate Air Force was confusing, did not accurately reflect the purpose of the organization, and was detrimental to fundraising efforts. According to CAF chief of staff Ray Kinney, "In many people's minds, the word 'confederacy' brings up the image of slavery and discrimination. We, in no way, are associated with that kind of stuff. So, it gives us, in a way, a black eye."

=== Accidents and incidents ===
On September 28, 1995, a Martin B-26 Marauder operated by CAF crashed near Odessa, Texas, killing all five crew members. The NTSB found that the pilot failed to maintain minimum airspeed.

On April 14, 2001, the CAF pilot of a Fairchild PT-19A was killed in a crash shortly after takeoff at Midland International Airport; the plane's one passenger survived. The NTSB cited the pilot's "failure to maintain airspeed which resulted in an inadvertent stall".

On May 14, 2001, both CAF crew members aboard a Vultee BT-13A died in a crash southeast of Odessa, Texas. The NTSB found that the pilot failed to maintain minimum airspeed.

On July 10, 2003, a CASA 2.111 operated by the CAF crashed in Cheyenne, Wyoming, killing both pilots.

On June 16, 2005, a PT-26 Cornell operated by CAF crashed in Williamson, Georgia, killing both crew members. The NTSB found that the pilot "attempted a takeoff with flaps extended."

On November 12, 2022, during the Wings Over Dallas airshow, two planes owned and operated by CAF—a Bell P-63F and the Boeing B-17G Texas Raiders—suffered a mid-air collision that killed six people.

== Membership ==
As of 2020, the Commemorative Air Force had more than 13,000 members, in more than 70 regional groups, called wings or detachments, in 27 states and five countries. Several hundred members actively serve as pilots and flight and/or maintenance crew members committed to preserving American combat aviation heritage. The CAF is an all-volunteer organization, made up of members from all backgrounds. Membership is open to everyone age 18 or older, and cadet membership is available for those over 12 years of age. Although a 501(c)(3) nonprofit, tax-exempt group, the CAF has received financial incentives from state and local governments to move to Dallas and operate in Midland.

== Organization ==
The American Airpower Heritage Group is the parent organization and is made up of four corporations:

- The Commemorative Air Force, the membership association
- A foundation that controls the financial assets and endowment
- A museum that manages the non-flying artifacts
- A flying museum that operates the flying aircraft
