= National Aviation Education Center =

Airplane museum

- Location within Texas
- Former name: American Airpower Heritage Museum, CAF Airpower Museum
- Established: 1965
- Location: Dallas, Texas, U.S. (since 2015)
- Coordinates: 32.677229°N 96.860801°W
- Type: Aviation museum
- Chairperson: Neils Agather
- Website: flynaec.org

The Henry B. Tippie National Aviation Education Center (NAEC) is an aviation museum operated by the American Airpower Heritage Museum (AAHM), (Note: Not to be confused with the similarly-named American Airpower Museum in the state of New York.) an affiliate organization of the Commemorative Air Force (CAF), headquartered at Dallas Executive Airport in Dallas, Texas, United States.

== History ==
The museum opened in its first building in Mercedes, Texas, in 1965 as a location to house and display World War II artifacts as they began to be donated to the Commemorative Air Force (CAF), then known as the Confederate Air Force. In 1968, both the CAF and AAHM moved to Harlingen, Texas.

In 1990, the AAHM became a separate non-profit organization, along with another legal entity, the American Airpower Heritage Flying Museum, created to hold title to the organization's aircraft. In 1991, both the AAHM and CAF moved to Midland, Texas, where the museum operated as the CAF Air Power Museum.

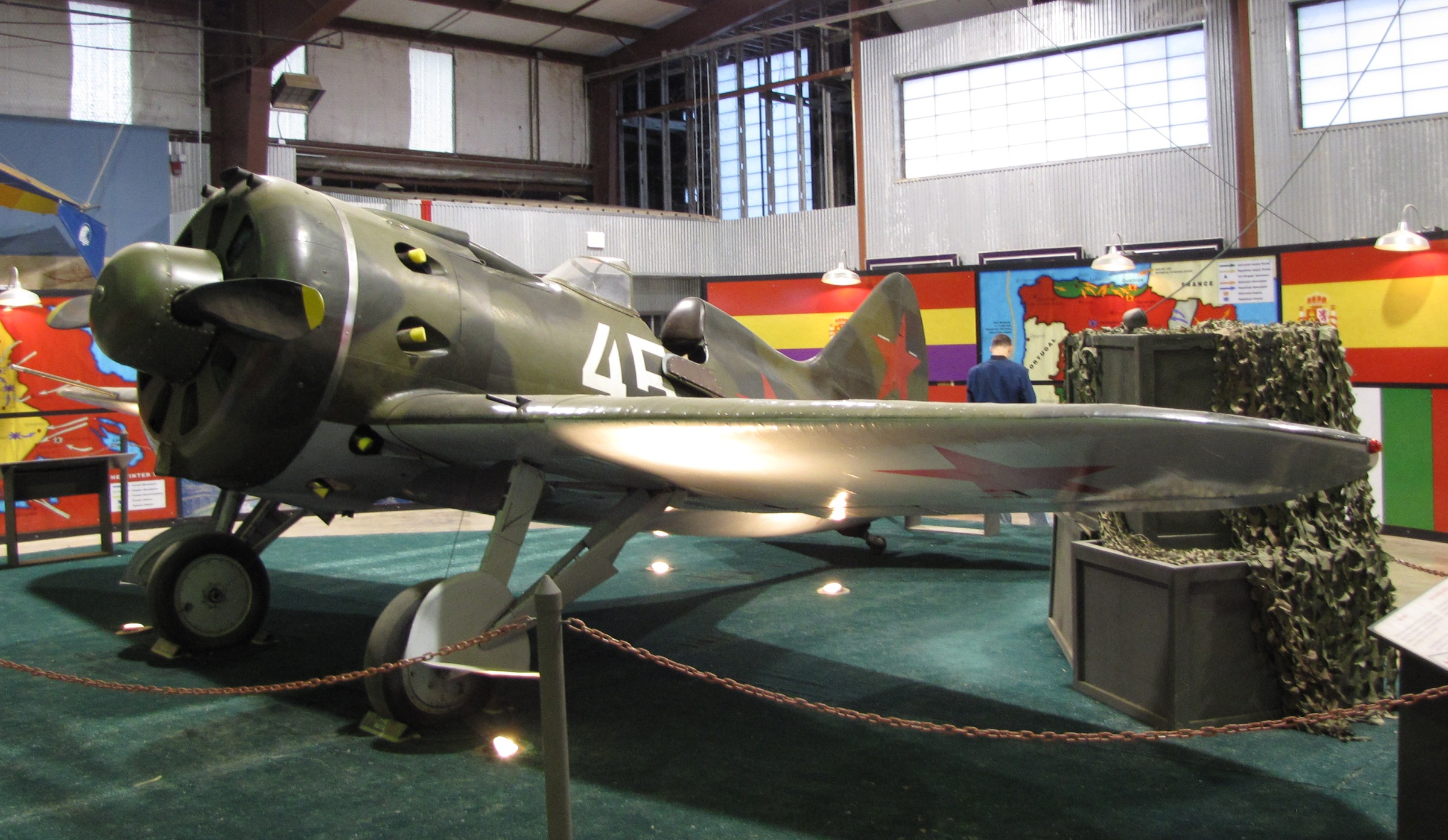
A Polikarpov I-16 on display at the museum in 2009 in Midland, Texas

In 2015, the museum's collection was moved to Dallas in anticipation of the creation of the CAF National Airbase. At that location, the CAF and AAHM now operate the Henry B. Tippie National Aviation Education Center (NAEC), a 47,000-square-foot (4,400 m^{2}) facility to provide "hands-on learning opportunities, an immersive history experience and activities for all ages." The facility is named in honor of Henry Tippie, a World War II veteran and longtime CAF member.

== Collections ==
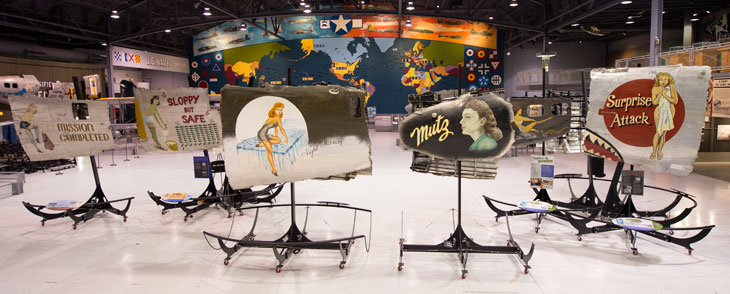
A portion of the museum's collection of authentic World War II nose art. The collection is currently on loan to the EAA Aviation Museum located in Oshkosh, Wisconsin.

The museum's collection, which numbers nearly 400,000 artifacts, focuses on the history of World War II military aviation culture and other material culture of this era. It has one of the most complete collections of World War II aviation culture in the United States with items that represent all of the axis and allies that participated in the air wars of World War II. The AAHM collects items, artifacts, and historical information of inherent value to World War II aviation and related culture, focusing on the period of 1939–1945.

Featured collections in the museum include:

- More than 4,900 oral histories collected from World War II Veterans of aviation
- The largest collection of original World War II nose art panels in the world
- A library of more than 6,000 books, 13,000 periodicals, as well as newspapers, microfilm, and numerous technical and field manuals related to military aviation

== See also ==
- List of aerospace museums
