= Dallas Executive Airport =

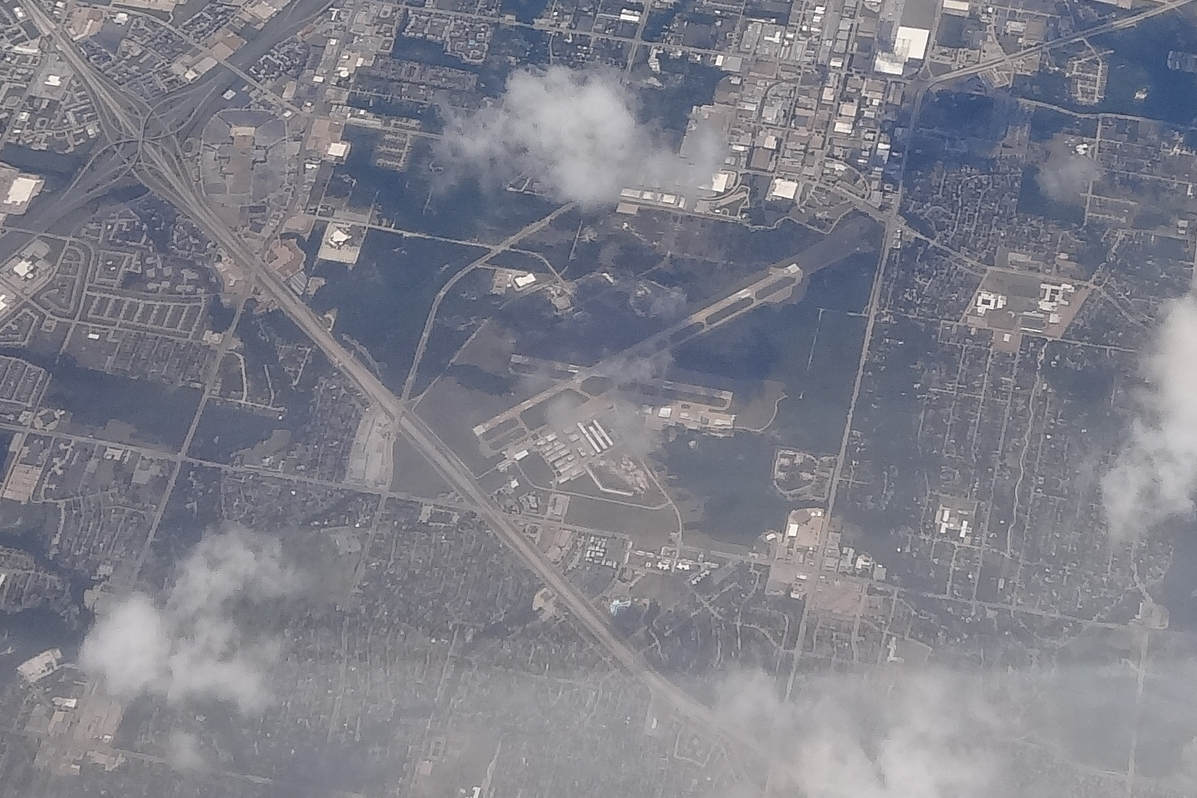
- IATA: RBD; ICAO: KRBD; FAA LID: RBD

Summary
- Owner: City of Dallas
- Operator: Dallas, Texas
- Location: 5303 Challenger Drive #17; Dallas, Texas, United States 75232
- Opened: 1944; 82 years ago
- Elevation AMSL: 661 ft (201 m)
- Coordinates: 32°40′51″N 96°52′06″W

Map
- Location within Texas Location within the United States

Runways
Direction	Length		Surface
Direction	ft	m	Surface
13/31	7,136	2,175	Concrete
17/35	3,800	1,158	Concrete

Statistics (2023)
- Aircraft movements (year ending 6/30/2023): 93,192
- Based aircraft: 358
- Source:Federal Aviation Administration

Dallas Executive Airport (IATA: RBD, ICAO: KRBD, FAA LID: RBD), formerly Redbird Airport, is six miles (10 km) southwest of Downtown Dallas, in Dallas County, Texas, United States. The airport is used for general aviation and is a reliever airport for Dallas Love Field. The Dallas Police Department also operates helicopters out of the airport.

== Facilities ==
Dallas Executive Airport covers 1,070 acres (433 ha) and has two runways:

- 13/31: 7,136 x 100 ft (2,175 x 30 m) asphalt/concrete
- 17/35: 3,800 x 150 ft (1,158 x 46 m) asphalt/concrete

== History ==
Redbird Airport (KRBD) was established in 1944 after 1026 acres were purchased by the City of Dallas to serve the general aviation needs in southwest Dallas. Redbird was renamed Dallas Executive Airport, effective May 1, 2002.

The airport briefly saw scheduled commercial air service in 2011 by Corporate Flight Management operating as Branson Air Express. The carrier flew to Branson, Missouri using British Aerospace Jetstream 41 aircraft.

In 2013, the Commemorative Air Force announced that they would build a "National Airbase" at Executive which would include their headquarters and main museum, both of which would be moved from Midland. In 2016, the Commemorative Air Force established their headquarters at the airport and currently occupies a hangar on the southeast side of the airfield.

During 2017, extensive work was done to improve the existing runway. Additional work was done in 2018 to extend runway 13/31 to move the safety areas and protection zones onto the airport.

== Accidents and incidents ==
- November 12, 2022: in the 2022 Dallas airshow mid-air collision, a Boeing B-17 Flying Fortress and a Bell P-63 Kingcobra collided and crashed at approximately 1:20 pm local time at the Wings Over Dallas airshow at the airport. Six perished, five occupants on the B-17 and the pilot on the P-63. The cause of the accident is under investigation.

== See also ==
- List of airports in Texas
