= Aircraft canopy =

Transparent enclosure over an aircraft cockpit

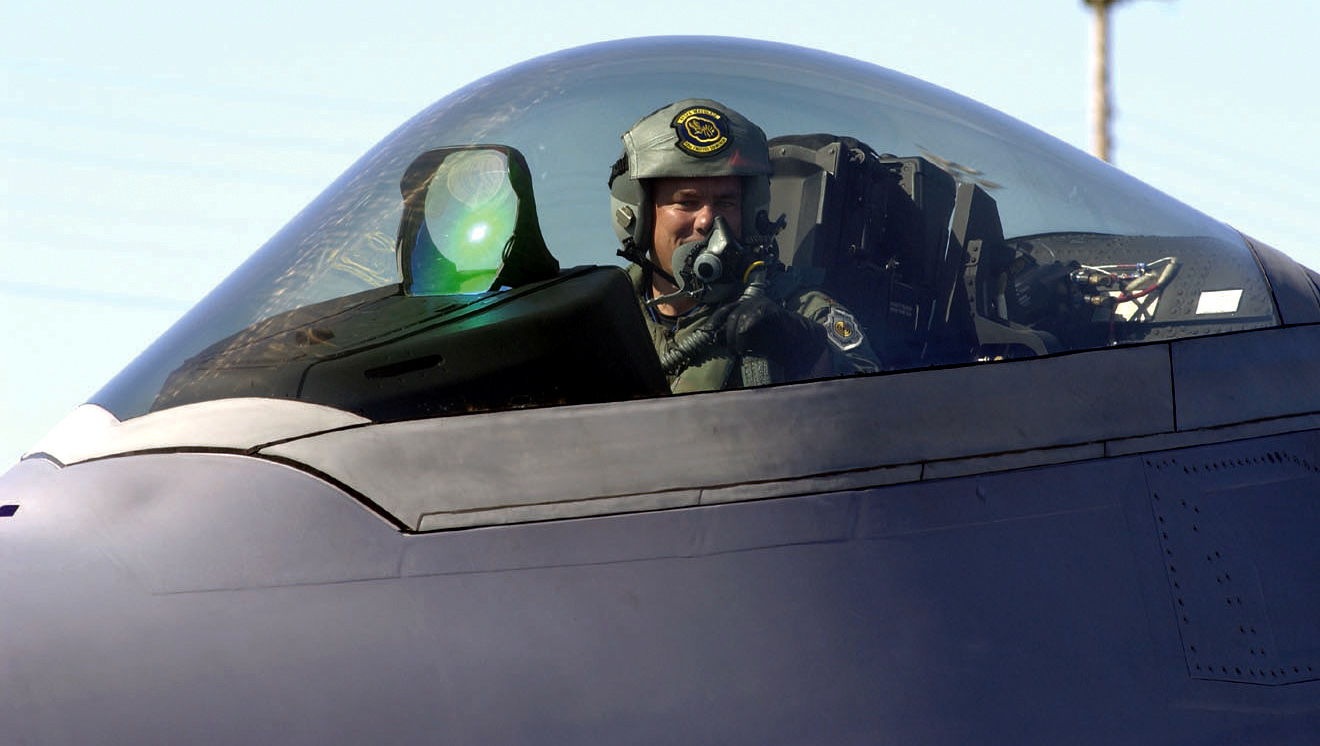
The bubble canopy of a Lockheed Martin F-22 Raptor

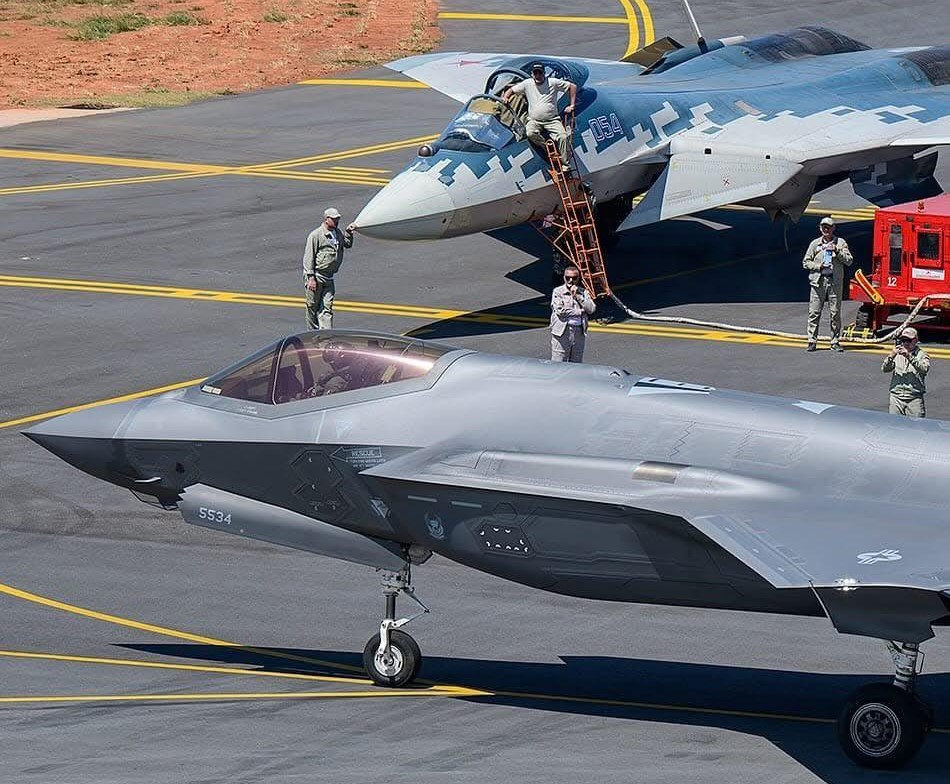
Lockheed Martin F-35 Lightning II alongside a Sukhoi Su-57 with slid canopy in the background.

An aircraft canopy is the transparent enclosure over the cockpit of some types of aircraft. An aircraft canopy provides a controlled and sometimes pressurized environment for the aircraft's occupants, and allows for a greater field of view over a traditional flight deck. A canopy's shape is a compromise designed to minimize aerodynamic drag, while maximizing visibility for pilots and other crewmembers.

== History ==
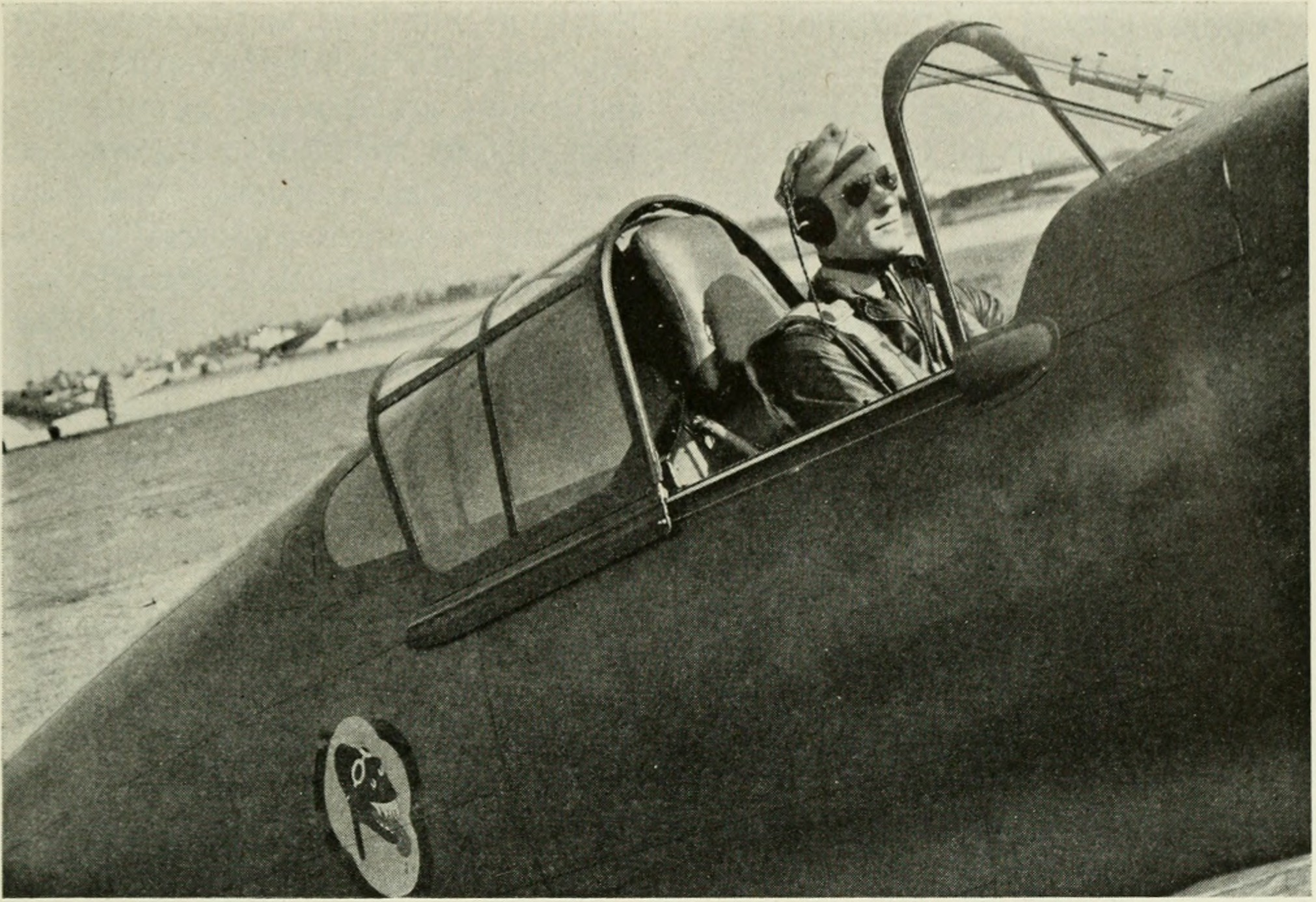
Cockpit of a Curtiss P-40 Warhawk, note the rearward visibility panels

Very early aircraft had no canopies. The pilots were exposed to the wind and weather, although most flying was done in good weather. Through World War I most aircraft had no canopy, although they often had a small windshield to deflect the prop wash and wind from hitting the pilot in the face. In the 1920s and 1930s, the increasing speed and altitude of airplanes necessitated a fully enclosed cockpit and canopies became more common.

Early canopies were made of numerous pieces of flat glass held in position by a frame and muntins. The muntins reduced visibility, which was especially awkward for military aircraft. Also, glass canopies were much heavier than acrylic canopies, which were first introduced shortly before the Second World War. Many aircraft used embedded canopies that restricted visibility for the pilot, some aircraft such as the Curtiss P-40 Warhawk and North American F-107 used rearward visibility panels, this not only intended for peripheral vision but provided ventilation and air circulation for the cockpit. The acrylic bubble canopy was used on aircraft such as the Supermarine Spitfire and Westland Whirlwind, which gave better all-round visibility and reduced weight and other advantages over the embedded canopy. It is still being used on most fighter aircraft.

== Ejection seat system ==
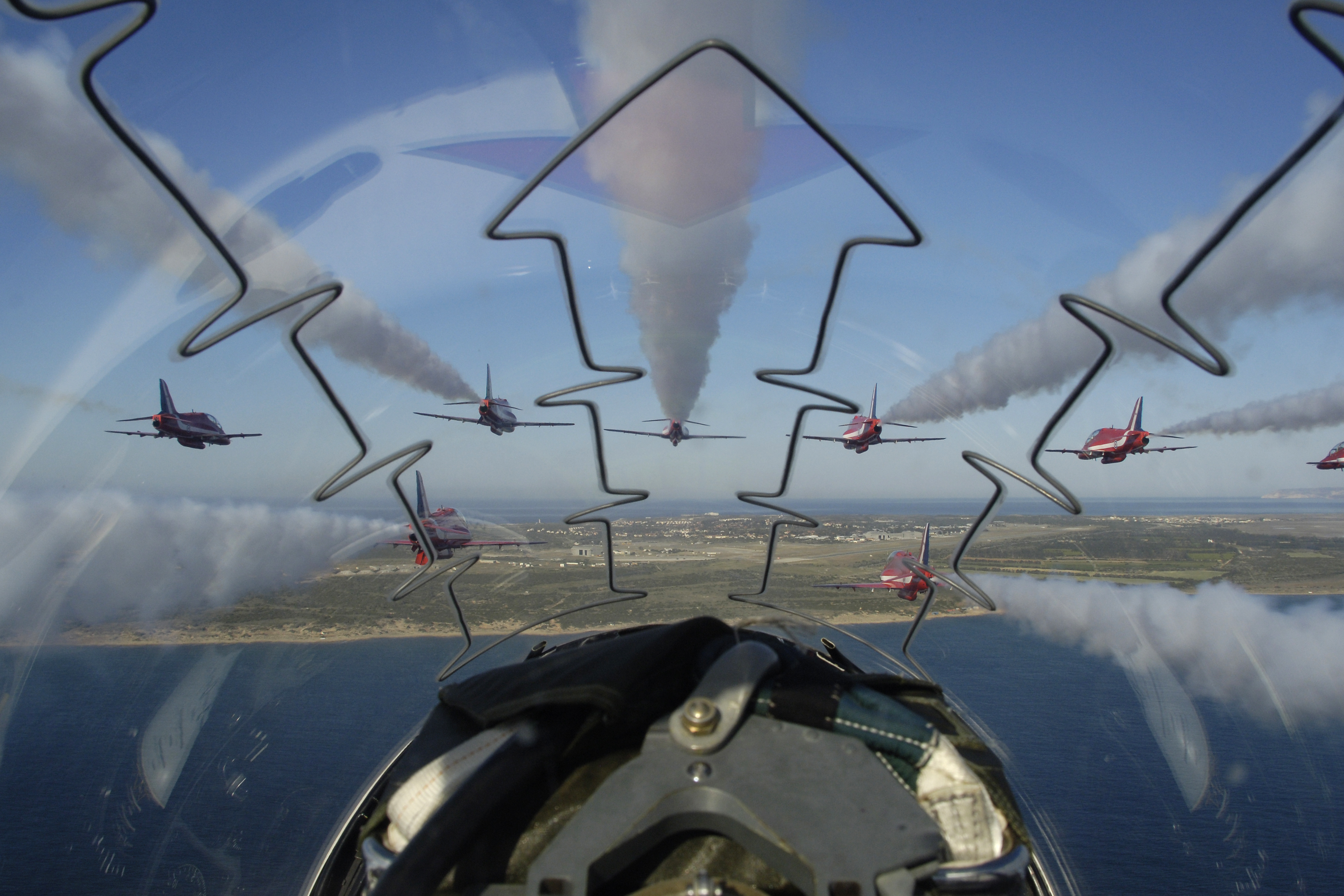
A cockpit view from a BAE Hawk showing the explosive cord in the canopy

On many high-performance military aircraft, the canopy is an integral part of the ejection seat system. The pilot cannot be ejected from the aircraft until the canopy is no longer in the path of the ejection seat. In most ejection seat equipped aircraft, the canopy is blown upwards and rearwards by explosive charges. The relative wind then blows the canopy away from the ejection path. However, on some aircraft, such as the McDonnell Douglas AV-8B Harrier II, the pilot may be forced to eject when in a hover, or when going too slow for the relative wind to move the canopy out of the path of the ejection seat. In that situation, the pilot could possibly impact the canopy when ejecting. To overcome that possibility, some aircraft have a thin cord of plastic explosive zig-zagging across the canopy over the pilot's head. In the event of an ejection, the explosive cord is activated first, shattering the canopy. Then the ejection seat and pilot is launched through the shattered canopy.

== Construction ==
Most modern acrylic canopies are vacuum formed. A sheet of acrylic is secured to a female mould, then the entire assembly is heated in an oven until the acrylic is pliable. The air is then removed from the mould and the acrylic sheet is drawn into it, forming the shape of the canopy. The acrylic is then trimmed to the appropriate shape and attached to an aluminum or composite frame. Some one-off canopies are made in a similar fashion, but since a mould would be too time-consuming to make, the acrylic is heated and vacuum formed until it approximates the shape the builder is seeking. This type of construction is less precise, however, and each canopy is unique. If multiple canopies will be needed, a mould is almost always used.

== Openings ==
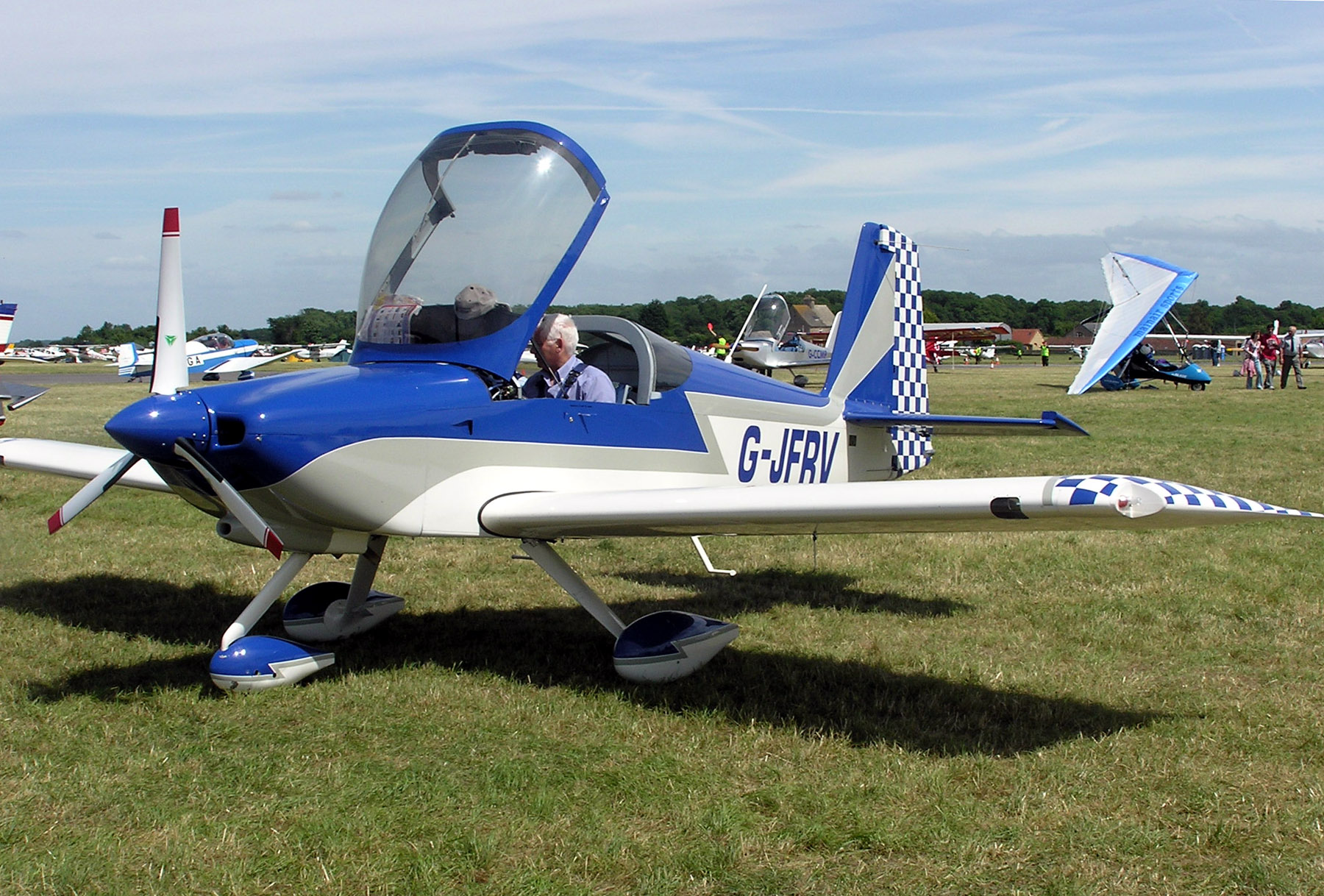
The raised flip-forward canopy of a Van's Aircraft RV-7

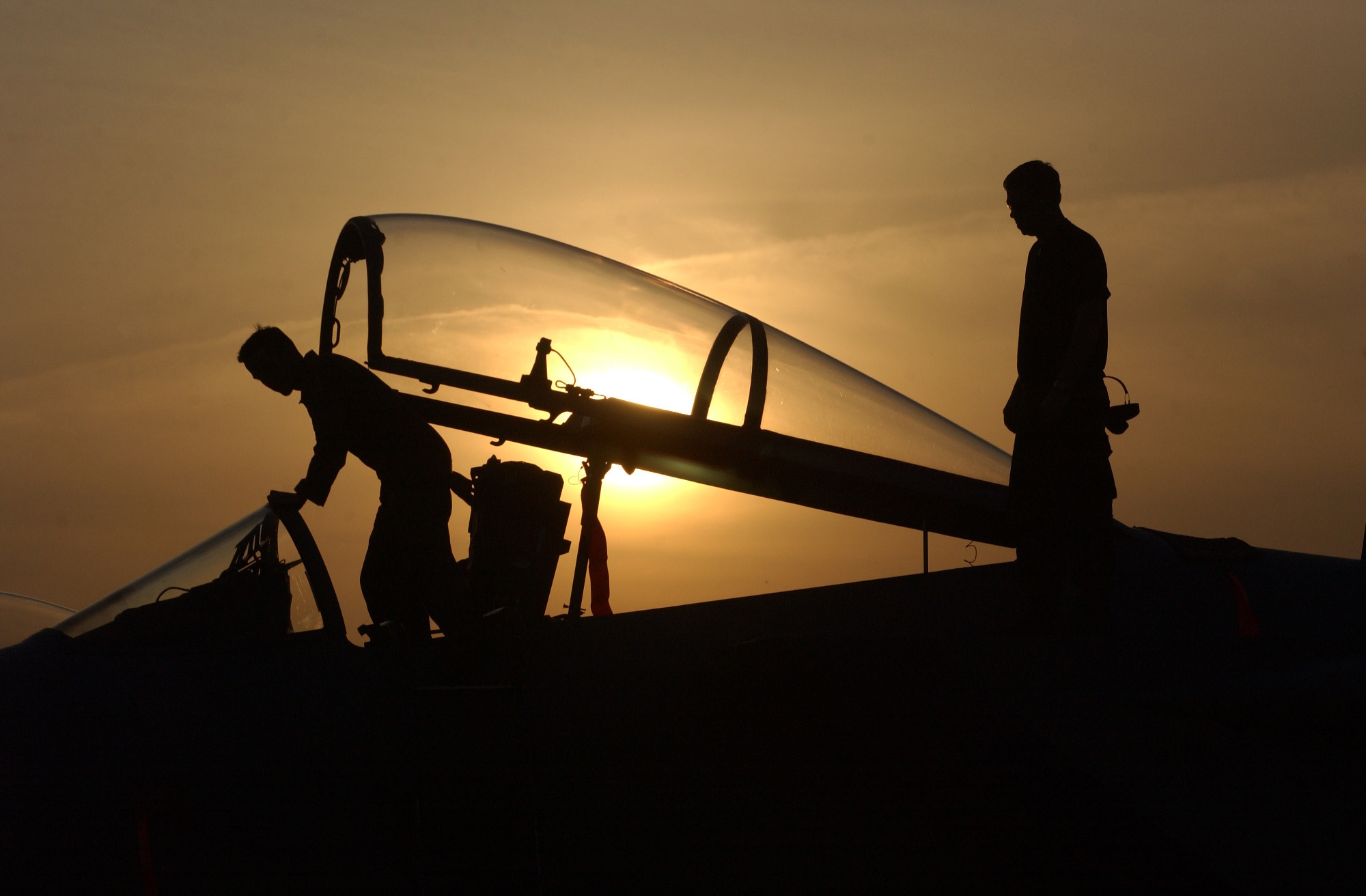
F-15 Eagle canopy

Aircraft canopies have various opening methods:

=== Sliding (forwards/rearwards) ===
- Zenair CH 200 (slide forwards)
- Vought F7U Cutlass (slide rearwards)
- Sukhoi Su-57 (slide rearwards)

=== Sideways ===
- Aero L-39 Albatros
- BAE Hawk
- EADS Mako/HEAT
- Mikoyan-Gurevich MiG-21
- General Dynamics F-111 Aardvark (both L/R sides)
- Yakovlev Yak-130 and Leonardo M-346 Master

=== Hinged forwards (flip-forward canopy) ===
- Van's Aircraft RV-7
- Lockheed Martin F-35 Lightning II

=== Hinged rearwards (flip-rearward canopy) ===
- Grumman F-14 Tomcat
- Boeing F-15 Eagle
- McDonnell Douglas F-4 Phantom II
- North American A-5 Vigilante

== Variations ==
=== Clamshell canopy ===
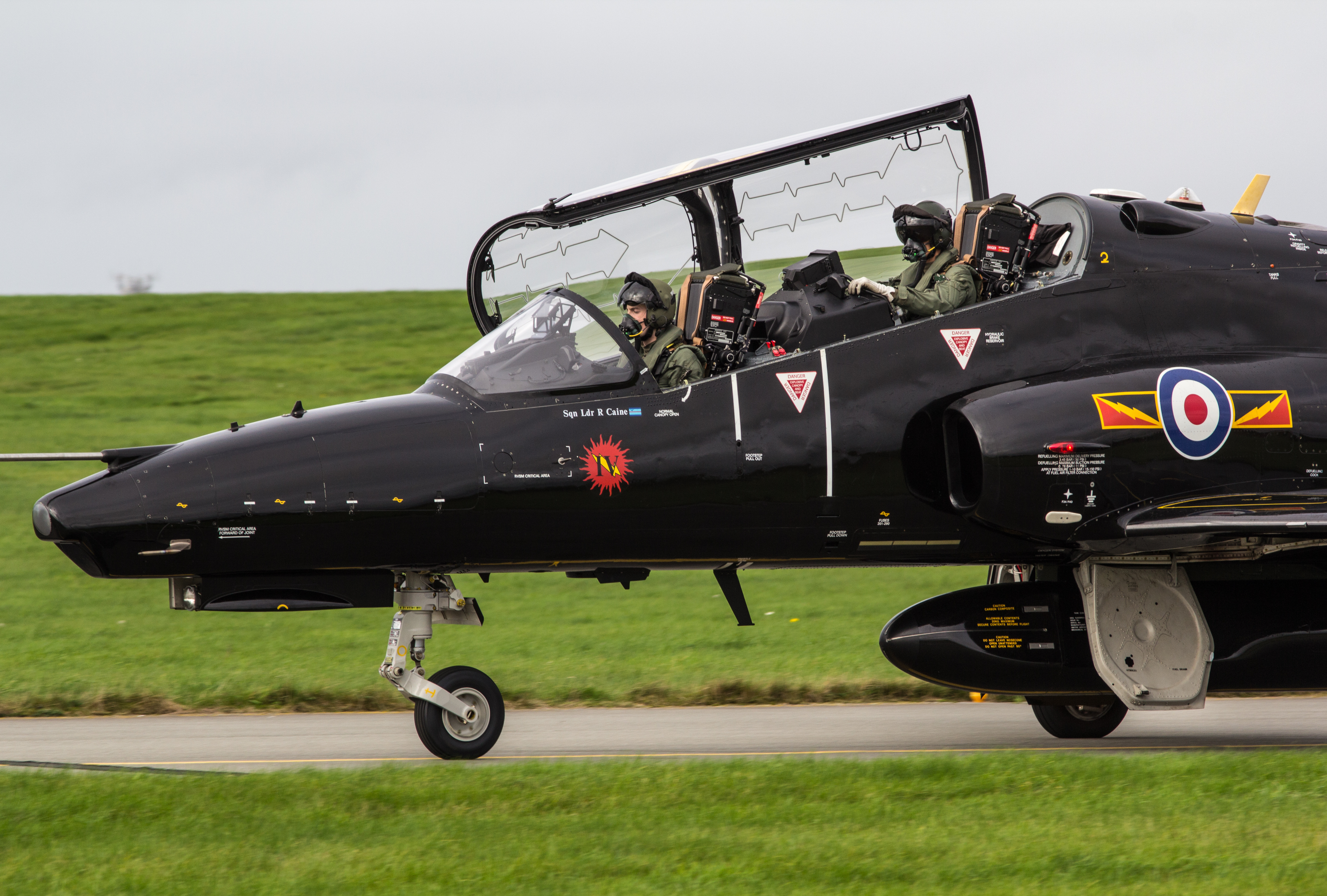
Side-opening clamshell on a BAE Hawk

A clamshell canopy uses a hinge on the rear of the cockpit, with some examples from the front or side. A more unusual example with two components with left and right sections requiring the pilot to enter the cockpit from the rear is found on the Payen PA-22 and Avro Arrow that used this method, the latter example for the use of ejection seats.

=== Stealth canopy ===
Have Glass is the code name for a series of RCS reduction measures for the F-16 fighter. Its primary aspect is the addition of an indium-tin-oxide layer to the gold tinted cockpit canopy, which is reflective to radar frequencies. An ordinary canopy would let radar signals straight through where they would strike the many edges and corners inside and bounce back strongly to the radar source; the reflective layer dissipates these signals instead. Overall, Have Glass reduces an F-16's RCS (radar-cross section) by 15 percent. The gold tint also reduces glare from the sun to improve visibility for the pilot.

=== Malcolm Hood ===
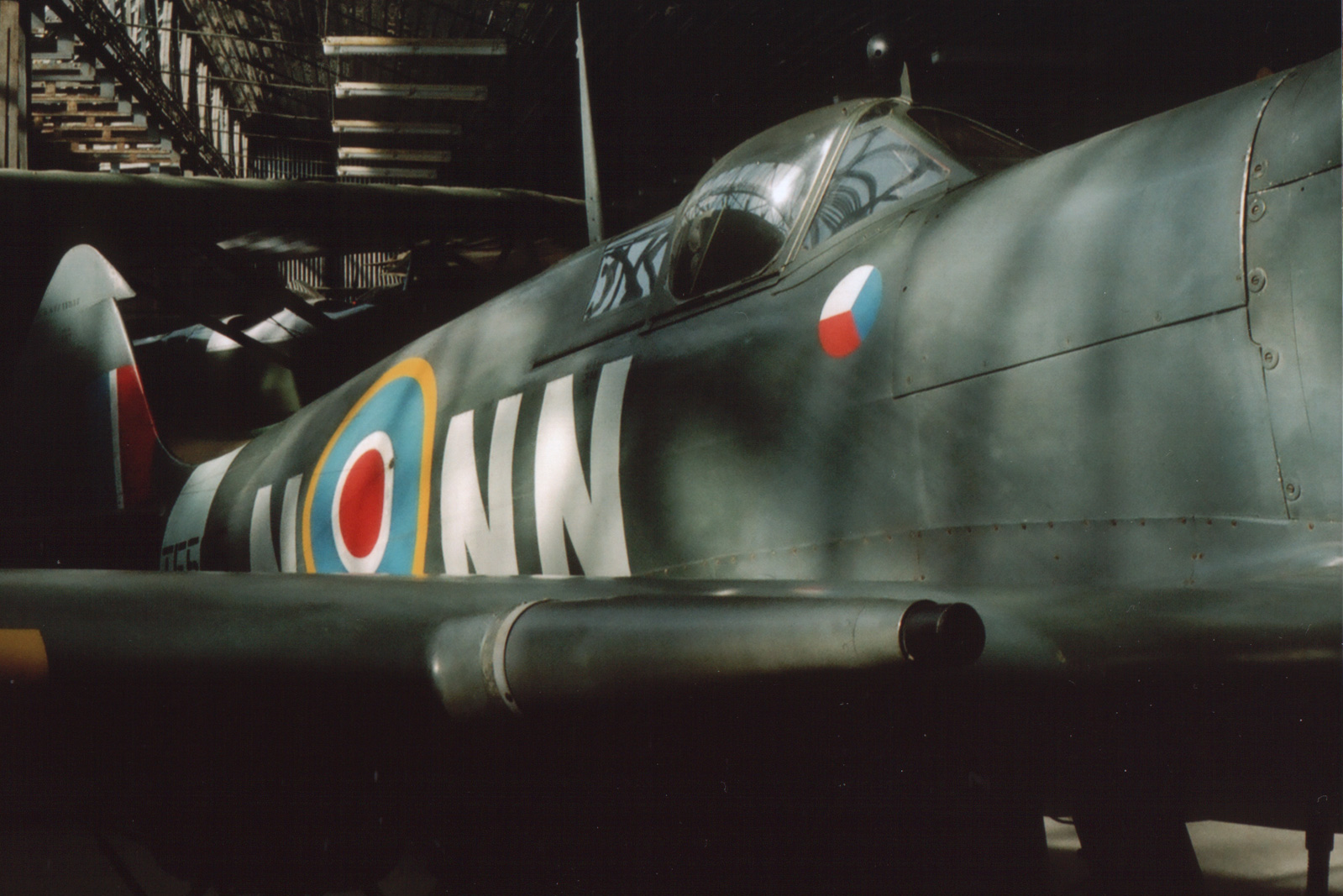
This Spitfire is equipped with a Malcolm Hood.

The Malcolm Hood is a type of aircraft canopy originally developed for the Supermarine Spitfire. Its concept proved valuable for other aircraft such as the North American Aviation P-51B & C Mustangs as retrofit items, and standard on later versions of the Vought F4U Corsair, and somewhat emulated on the later models of the Luftwaffe's Focke-Wulf Fw 190 fighter. The canopy was manufactured by the British company R Malcolm & Co which gave its name. Instead of taking a straight line between the canopy frames, the hood was bulged outward. This gave the pilot a better view to the rear.

A bulged hood replaced the Vought Corsair's "birdcage" framed canopy from the 689th production F4U-1 to provide better all-round field of view.

=== False canopy ===
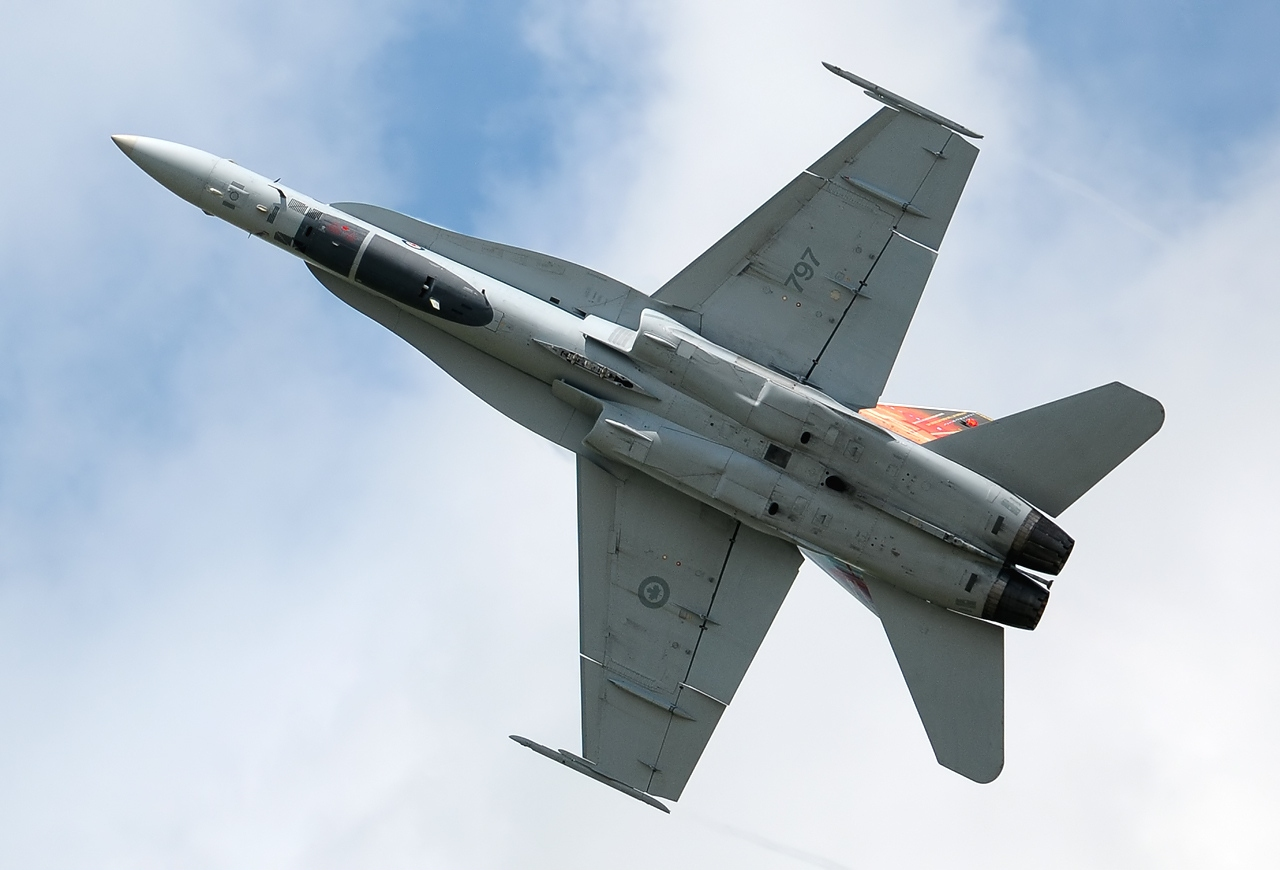
CF-18 Hornet of the RCAF displaying a false canopy

In the 1970s, US aviation artist Keith Ferris invented a false canopy to paint on the underside of military aircraft, directly underneath the front of the plane, the purpose of deception which was to camouflage the direction the aircraft is heading. This ruse was inspired by animals and fishes that have similar markings on the head and tail, so they can confuse other creatures. Canada was the first operational user, painting CF-18s with a canopy on the bottom of the plane.

=== Synthetic canopy ===
A type of canopy used as part of a synthetic cockpit where the pilot would not have direct sight of the outside world, but through an array of cameras. The British Aerospace P.125 was to use the have not glass cockpit arrangement that would increase stealth characteristics and would block out the potential Soviet threat of laser weapons that would dazzle the pilot.

== Gallery ==
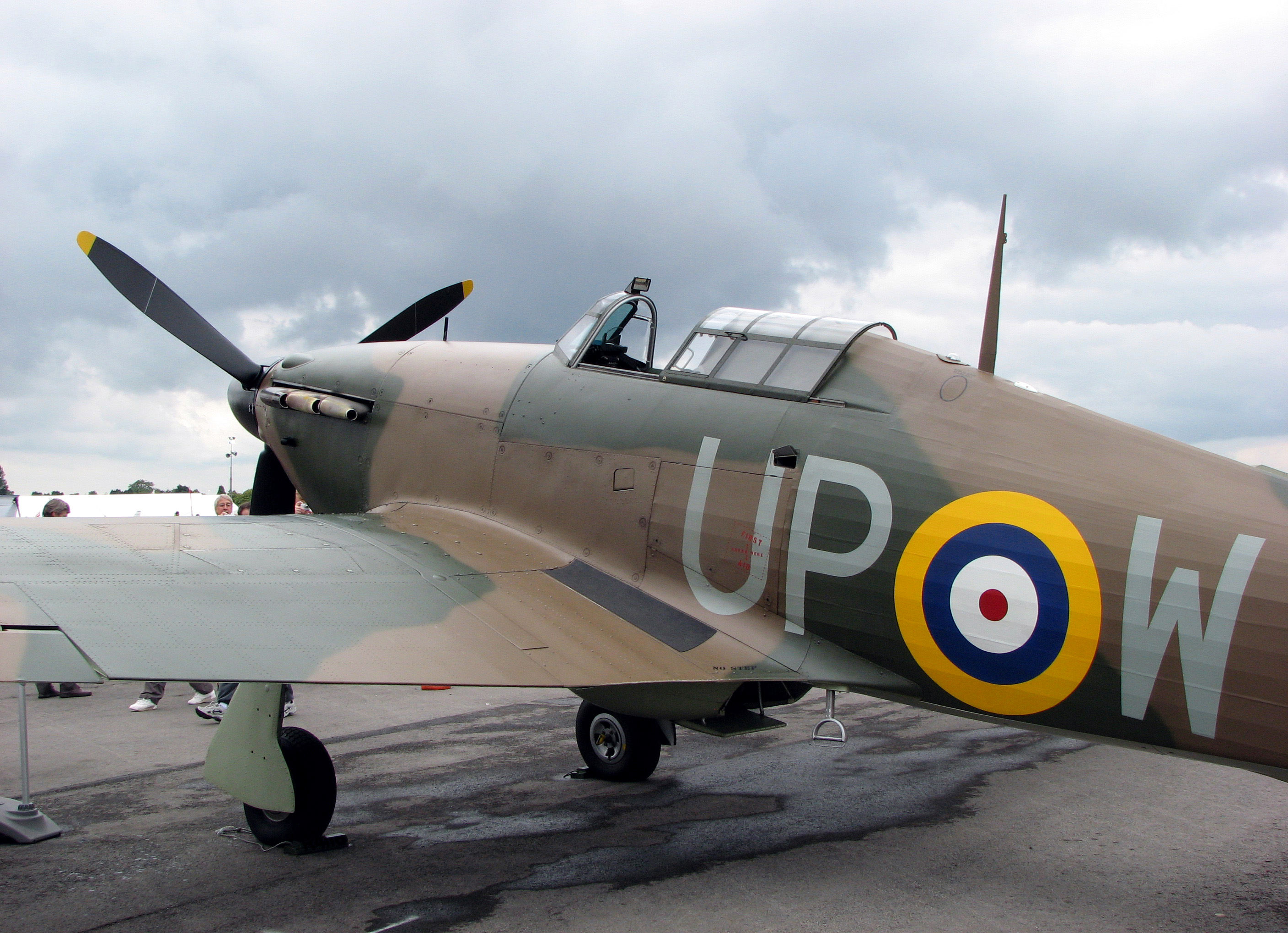
Hawker Hurricane with framed canopy slid to rear

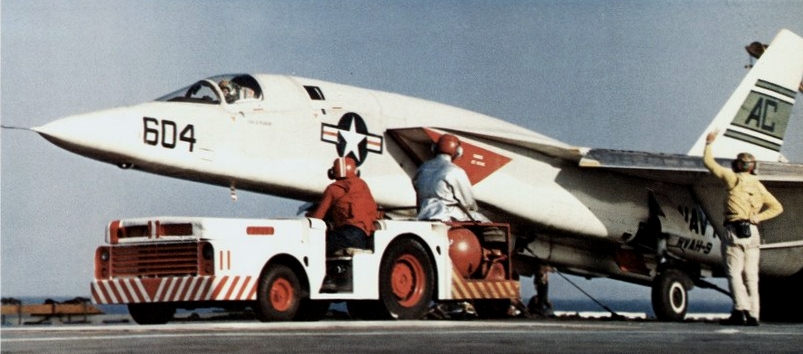
North American A-5 Vigilante with embedded canopy

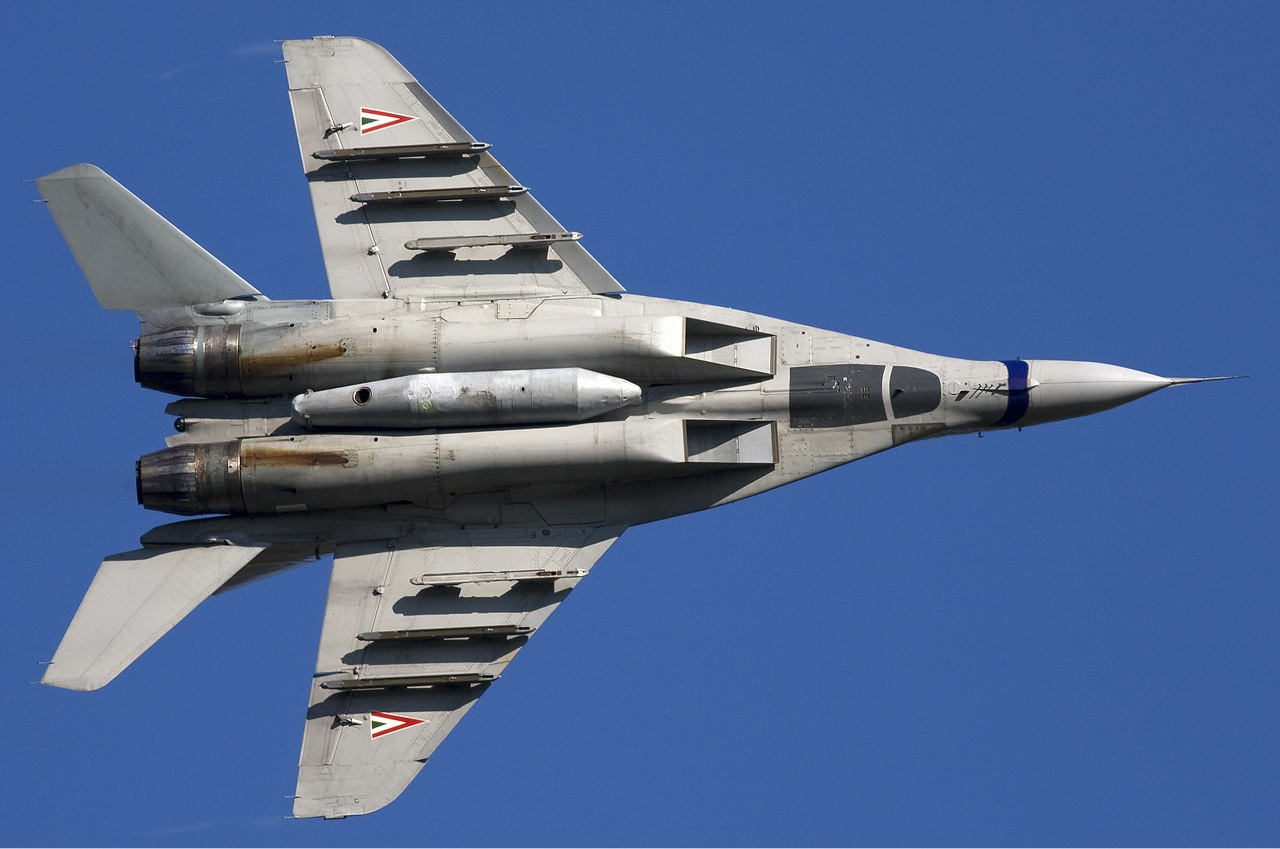
Underside of a Mikoyan-Gurevich MiG-29, showing painted "false canopy"

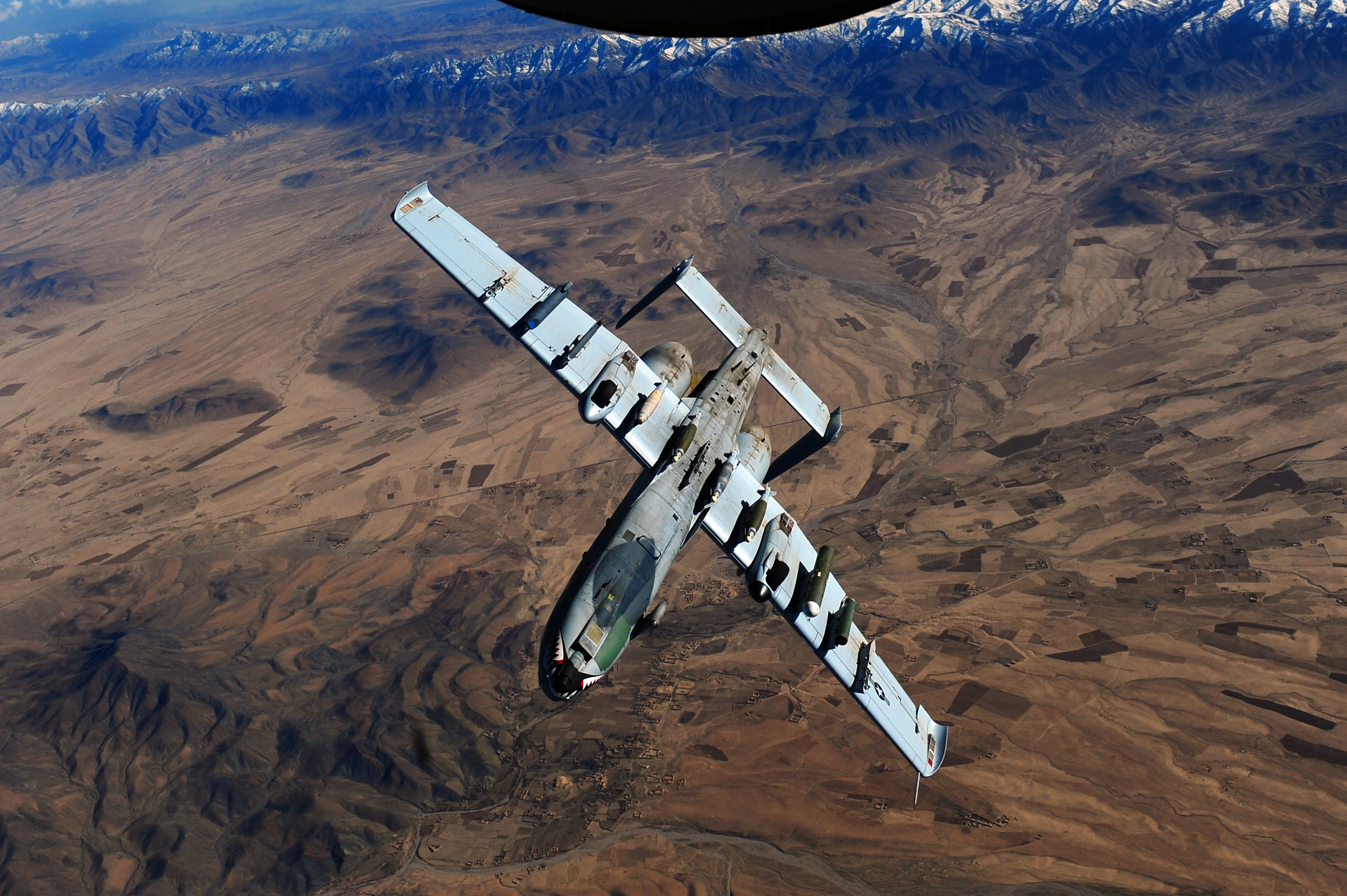
Underside of a Fairchild Republic A-10 Thunderbolt II, showing painted "false canopy"

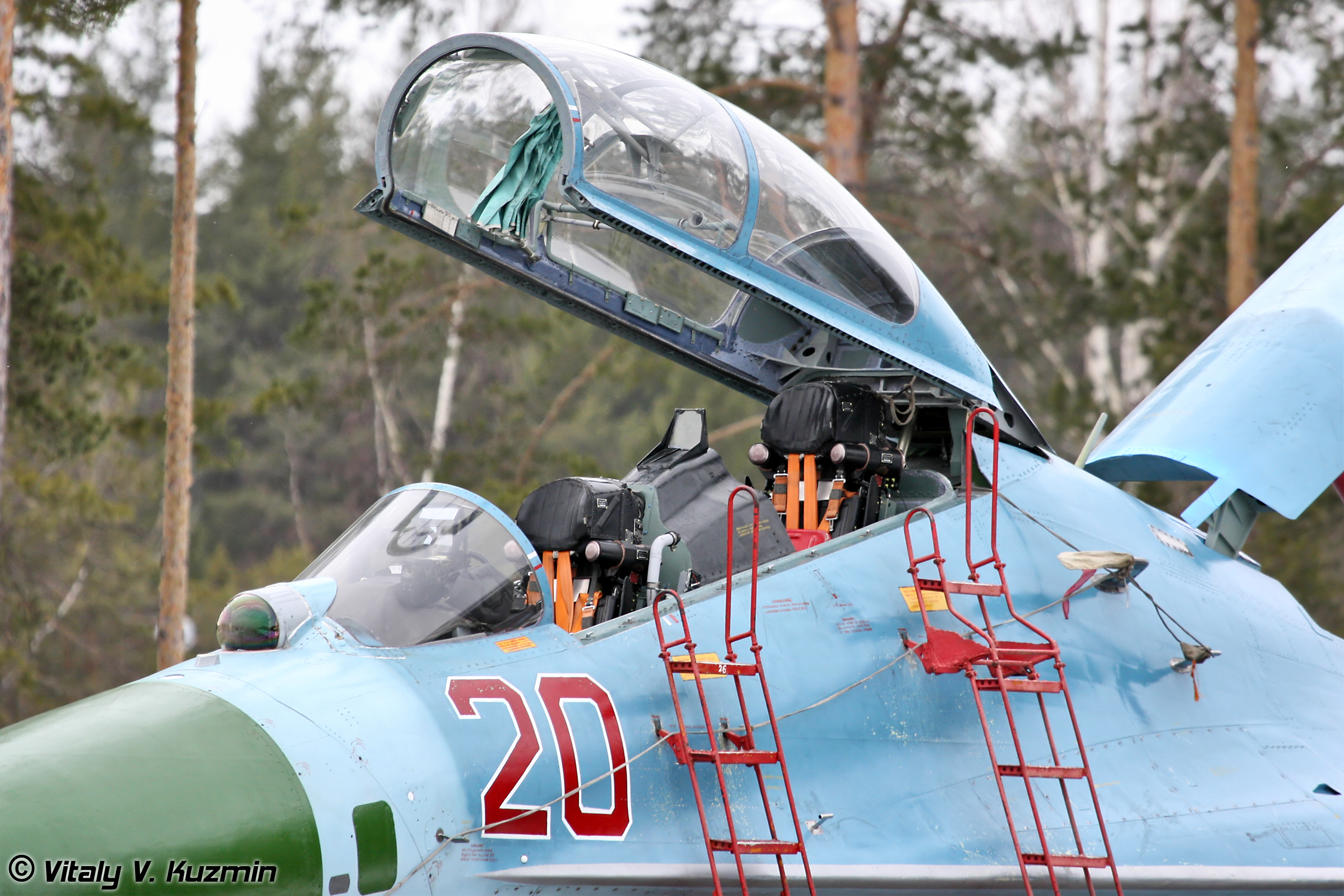
Sukhoi Su-35 with elongated double canopy

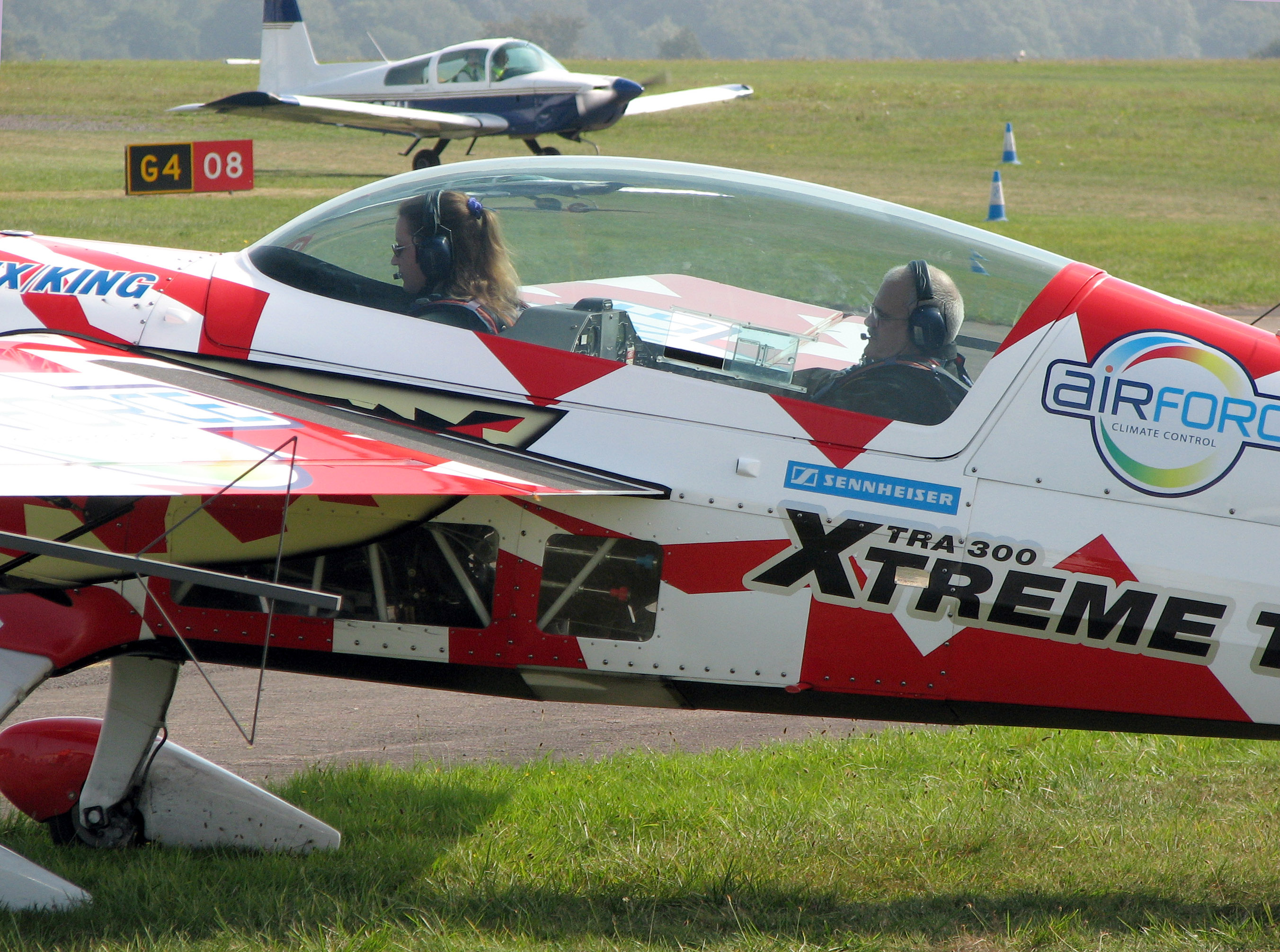
Extra 300 with a low drag canopy

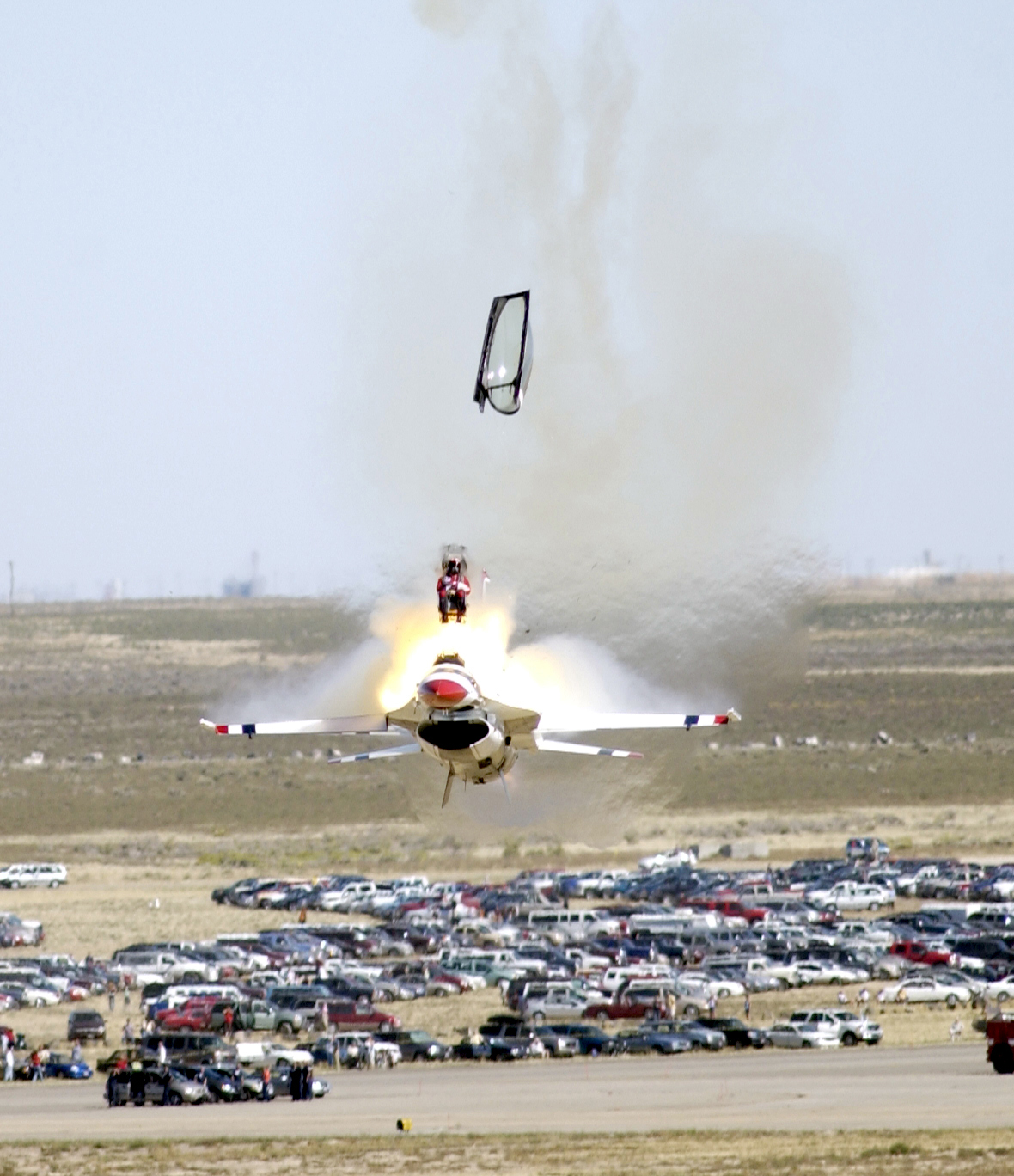
F-16 ejection during an air show showing the canopy blown away from the aircraft by explosive charges

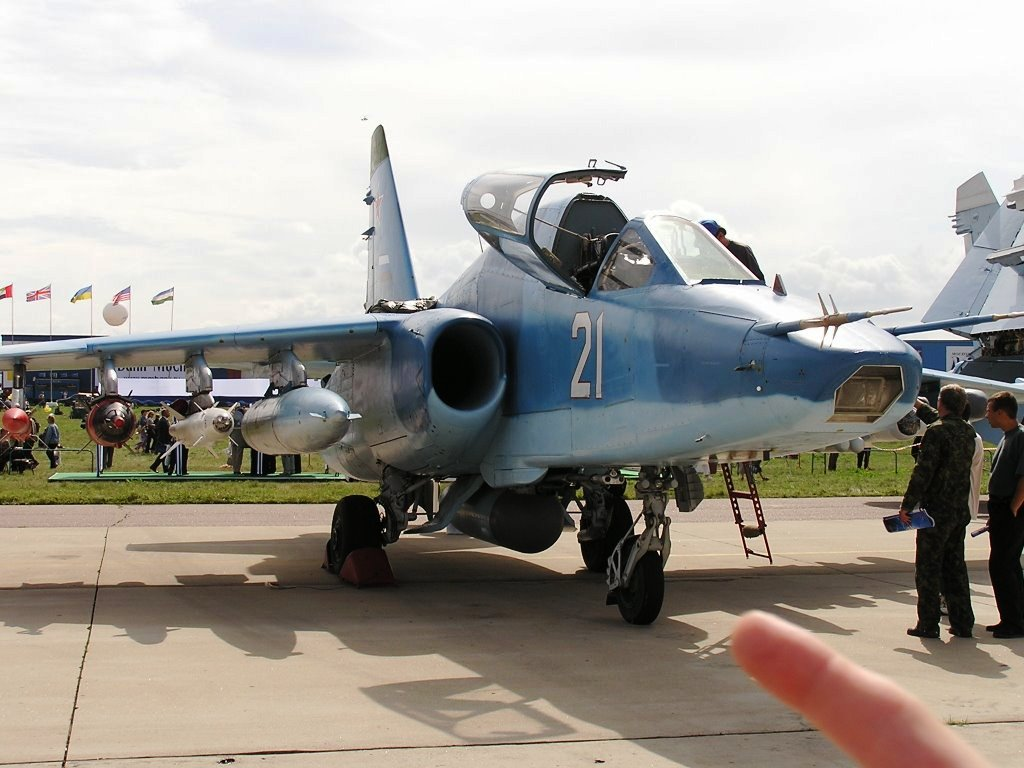
Sukhoi Su-25 with open side-hinged canopy

== See also ==
- Bubble canopy
- Index of aviation articles
