= Thunderbird (aircraft) =

American B-17 heavy bomber from World War II

Thunderbird 42-38050
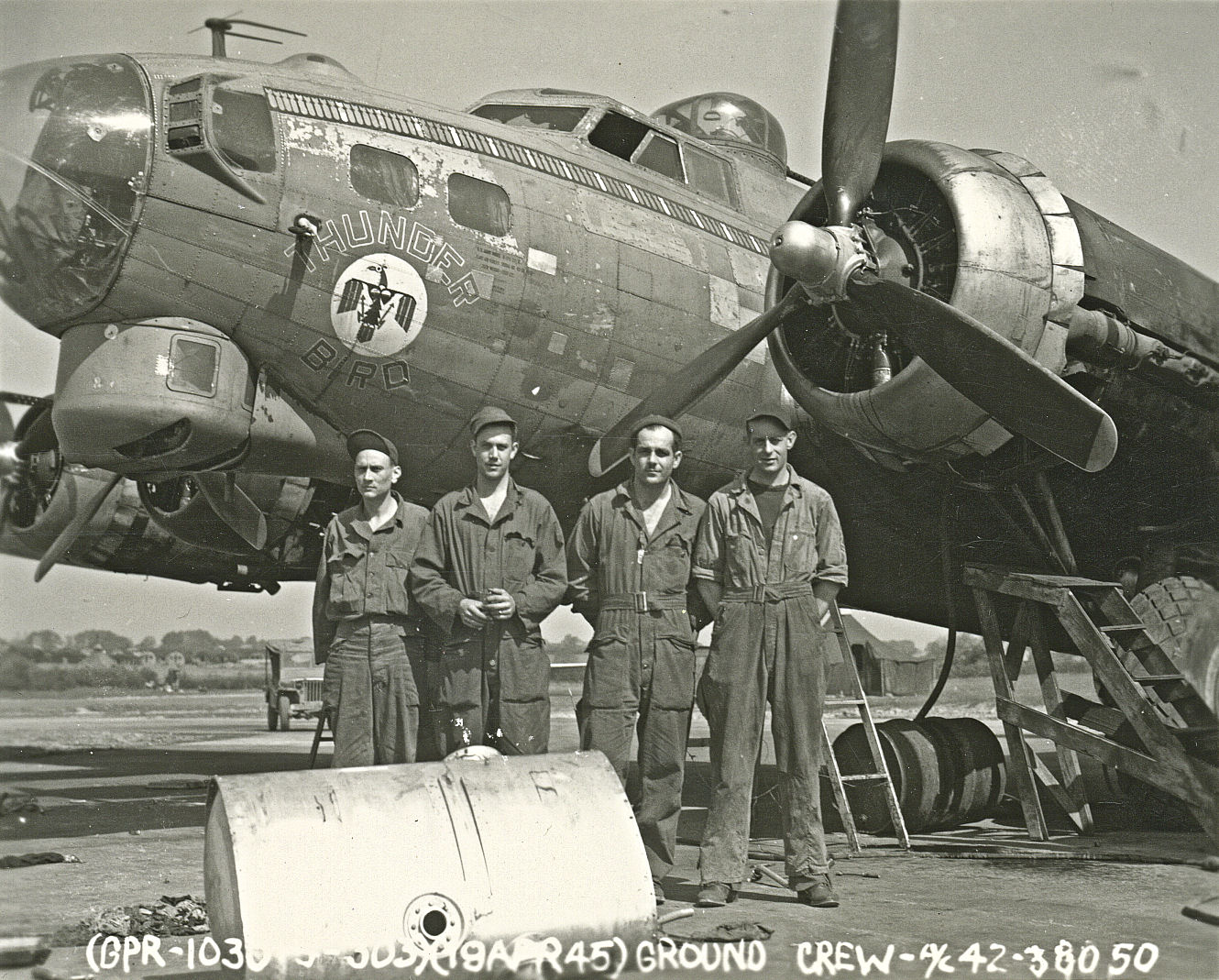
- 42-38050 and its ground crew in April 1945

General information
- Type: Boeing B-17G Flying Fortress
- Manufacturer: Douglas Aircraft Company
- Owners: USAAF
- Serial: 42-38050

History
- Manufactured: November 1943
- In service: 1943–1945
- Fate: Scrapped at Kingman, Arizona, aircraft disposal plant

Thunderbird was a high mission-tally Boeing B-17G Flying Fortress of the 303rd Bombardment Group during World War II. The original plane, serial number 42-38050, was scrapped at the end of the war and no longer exists. The name also appears on a later B-17G delivered at the end of the war, serial number 44-85718, which remains airworthy and is painted to replicate the earlier Thunderbird.

== History ==
=== Original Thunderbird (42-38050) ===
Serial number 42-38050 was a B-17G-25-DL manufactured by Douglas Aircraft Company in Long Beach, California. She was accepted by the United States Army Air Forces (USAAF) in November 1943 and arrived at RAF Molesworth in England on 18 January 1944. The plane flew 112 combat missions with the 359th Bombardment Squadron of the 303rd Bombardment Group.

On 23 January 1944, she was assigned to the crew of 1st Lt. Vern L. Moncur, of Rupert, Idaho, and Bountiful, Utah, which had six previous missions in other bombers. After that crew completed her tour on April 10, she was used as a "new crew" aircraft, used to break in replacement crews, although eight of the missions were flown by the crew of 1st Lt. Richard K. Marsh between April 11 and June 2.

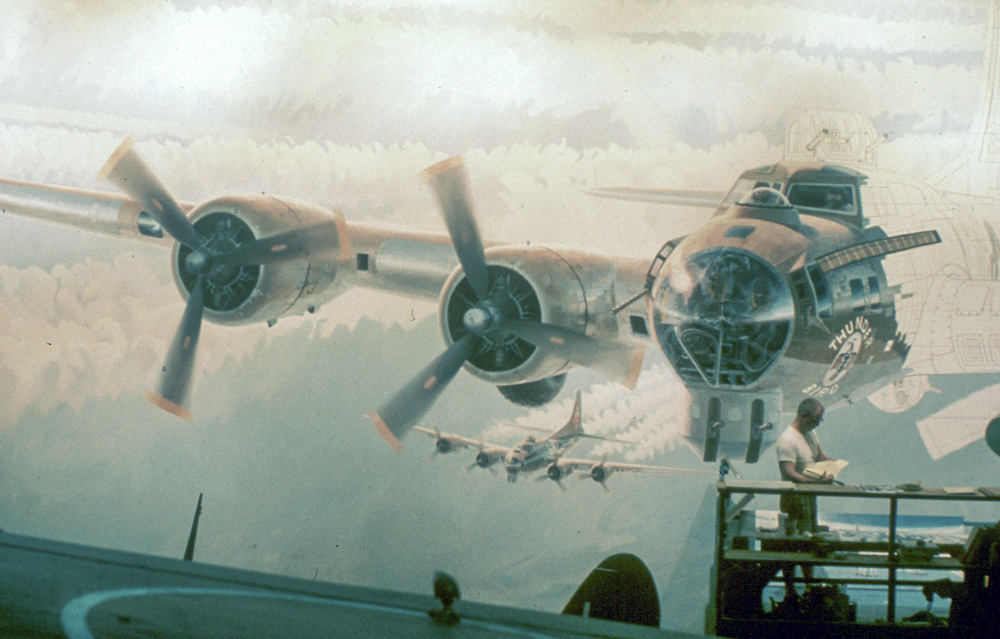
Artist Keith Ferris painting the mural of Thunderbird

She flew her first mission on January 29, 1944 (Frankfurt, Germany), and her last on March 22, 1945 (Gelsenkirchen, Germany), after which she was retired as "war weary". She reputedly was crewed by 538 different airmen, none of whom suffered an injury aboard Thunderbird. Returned to the United States after the war, she was sent to Kingman Army Airfield, Arizona, where she was scrapped.

==== Legacy ====
This plane is the subject of a 25-by-75-foot (7.6 by 22.9 m) mural in the World War II Gallery of the National Air and Space Museum in Washington, D.C., entitled "Fortresses Under Fire", completed 1975–1976. The artist, Keith Ferris, depicted Thunderbird on her 70th mission at 11:45 a.m., August 15, 1944, over Trier, Germany, on her return to Molesworth following a mission to bomb Wiesbaden, and is historically accurate in the encounter portrayed.

Ferris used Thunderbird as the centerpiece of two other paintings, "Retirement Party for Old Thunderbird" (1965 for the Air Force Art Collection), showing the bomber on her 112th and last mission, and "Schweinfurt Again", depicting the bomber on her 76th mission in October 1944.

=== Extant Thunderbird (44-85718) ===
Thunderbird 44-85718
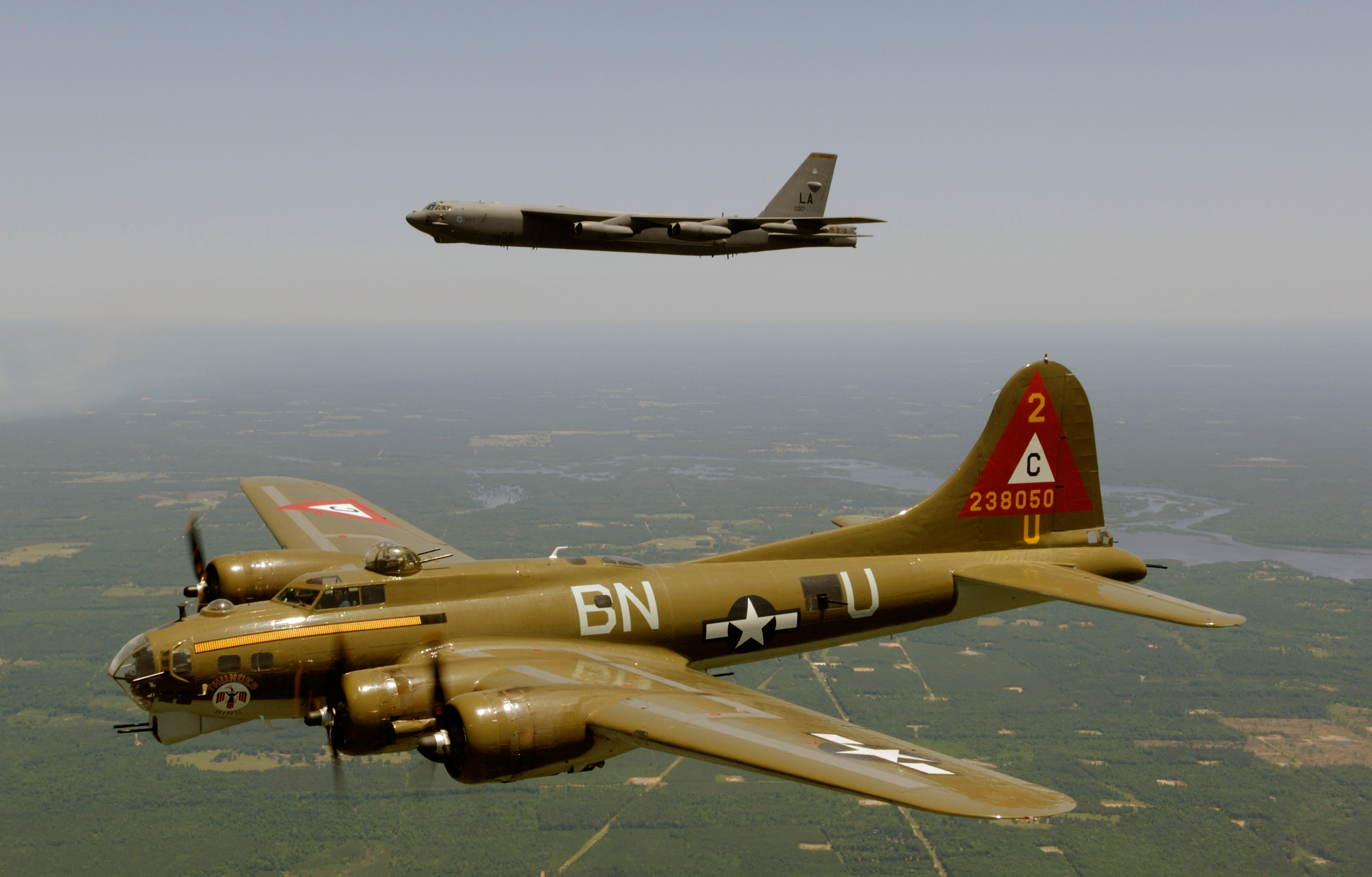
- 44-85718 wearing the livery of 42-38050 at the Defenders of Liberty Airshow at Barksdale Air Force Base in 2006

General information
- Type: Boeing B-17G Flying Fortress
- Manufacturer: Lockheed Aircraft Company
- Registration: N900RW
- Serial: 44-85718

History
- Manufactured: May 1945
- Preserved at: Mid America Flight Museum (since December 2020)
- Fate: Sold into private use, acquired by Lone Star Flight Museum in 1987

Serial number 44-85718 was built as a B-17G-105-VE by the Vega Division of Lockheed Aircraft Company in Burbank, California. She was delivered on 9 May 1945—the day after VE Day, the end of hostilities in the European theater of World War II. She was sold for scrap in November 1945, but was subsequently registered in France in 1947 and in England in 1984. The plane was purchased for the Lone Star Flight Museum (LSFM) of Texas in 1987 and returned to the U.S.

The plane was painted to replicate the original Thunderbird, above, and made various airshow appearances. It was retained by LSFM until being sold in December 2020 to the Mid America Flight Museum of Mount Pleasant, Texas. As of February 2022, the plane was located at the shop of the Erickson Aircraft Collection in Madras, Oregon, undergoing a prolonged period of inspection and maintenance work.

The plane is registered with the Federal Aviation Authority (FAA) as N900RW. It is one of the few surviving flyable B-17s.

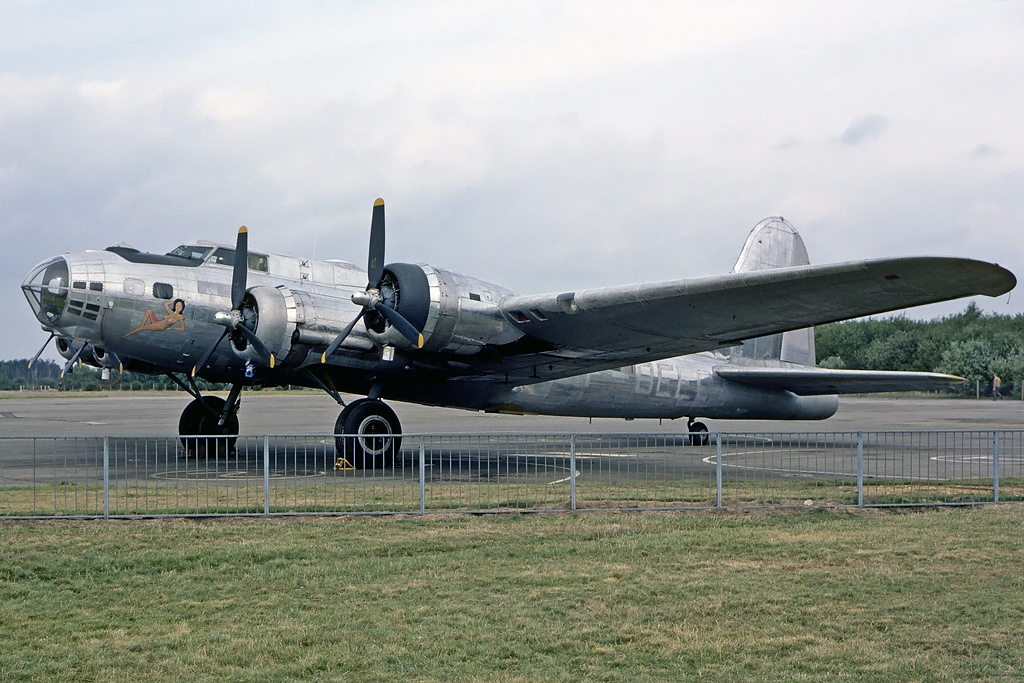
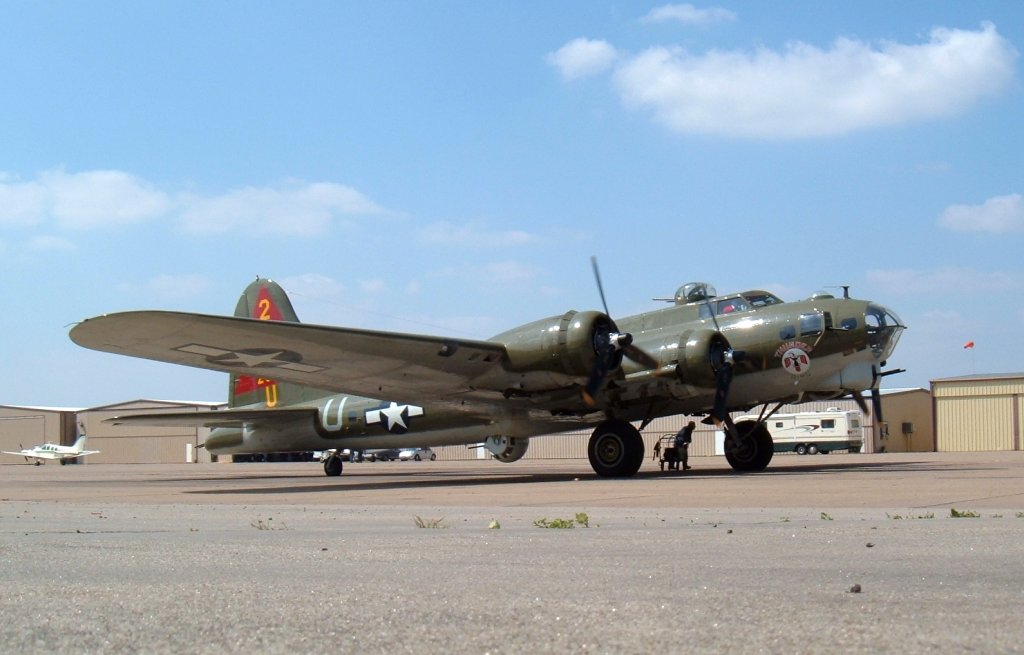
44-85718 photographed in 1984 (left) and 2006
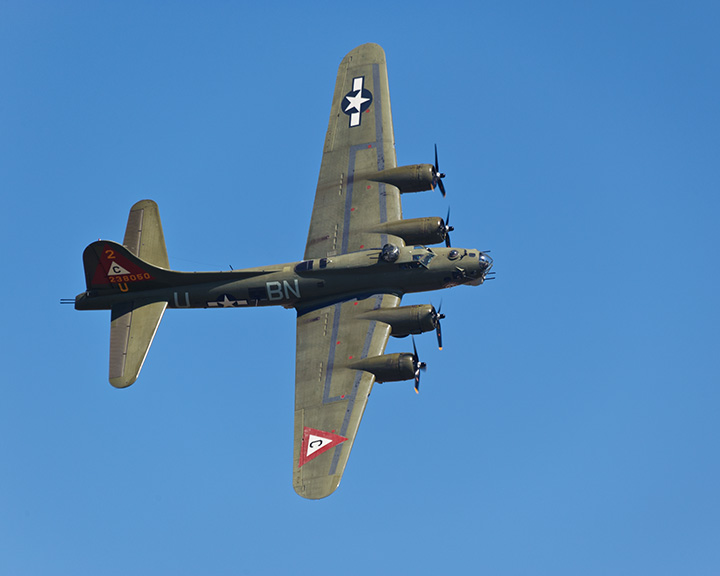
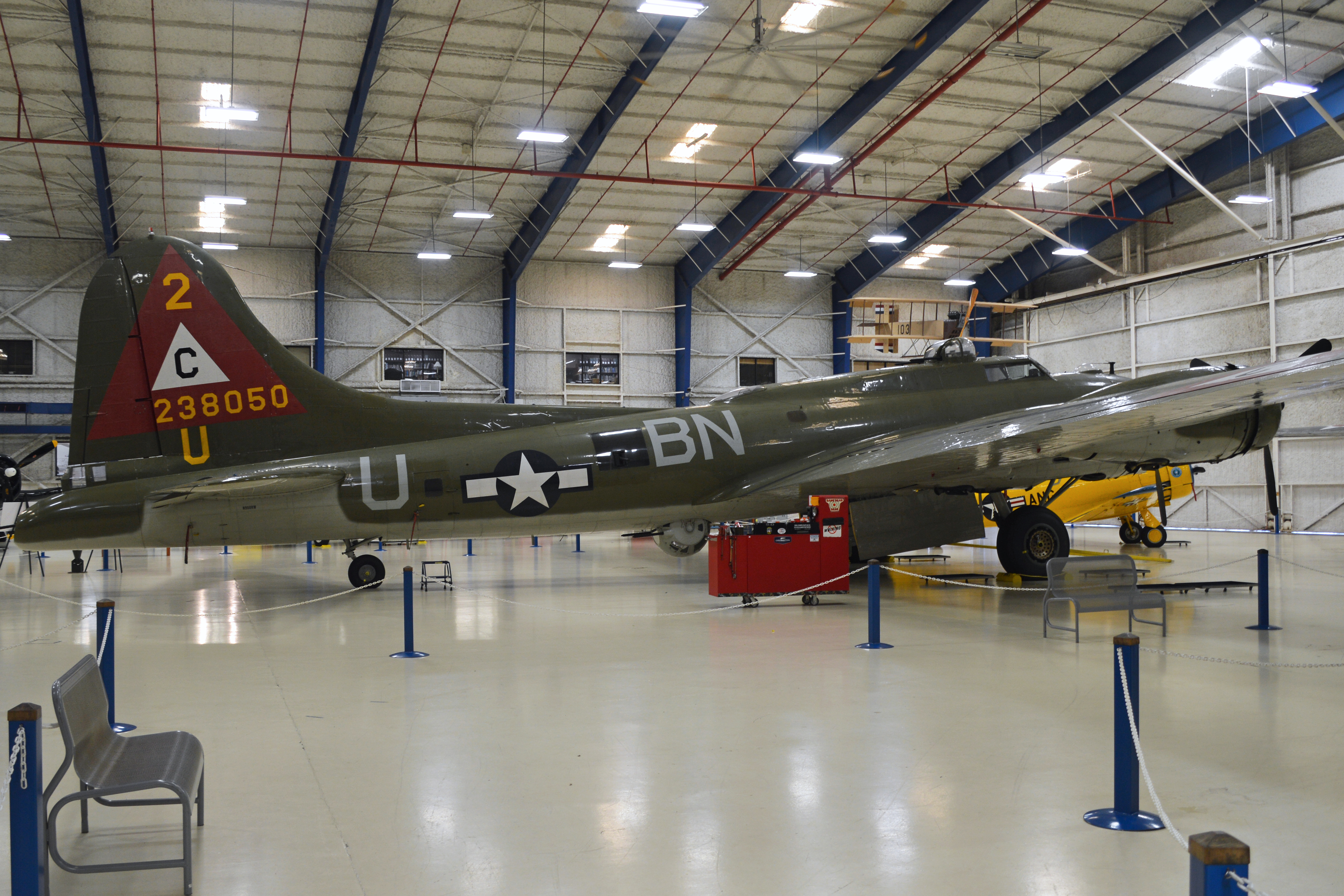
44-85718 photographed 2011 (left) and 2017

== Sources ==
- O'Leary, Michael. "Thunderbird", Air Classics, August 2004. Challenge Publications, inc.
- B-17 Thunderbird.com memorial site
