= Keith Ferris =

American aviation artist (born 1929)

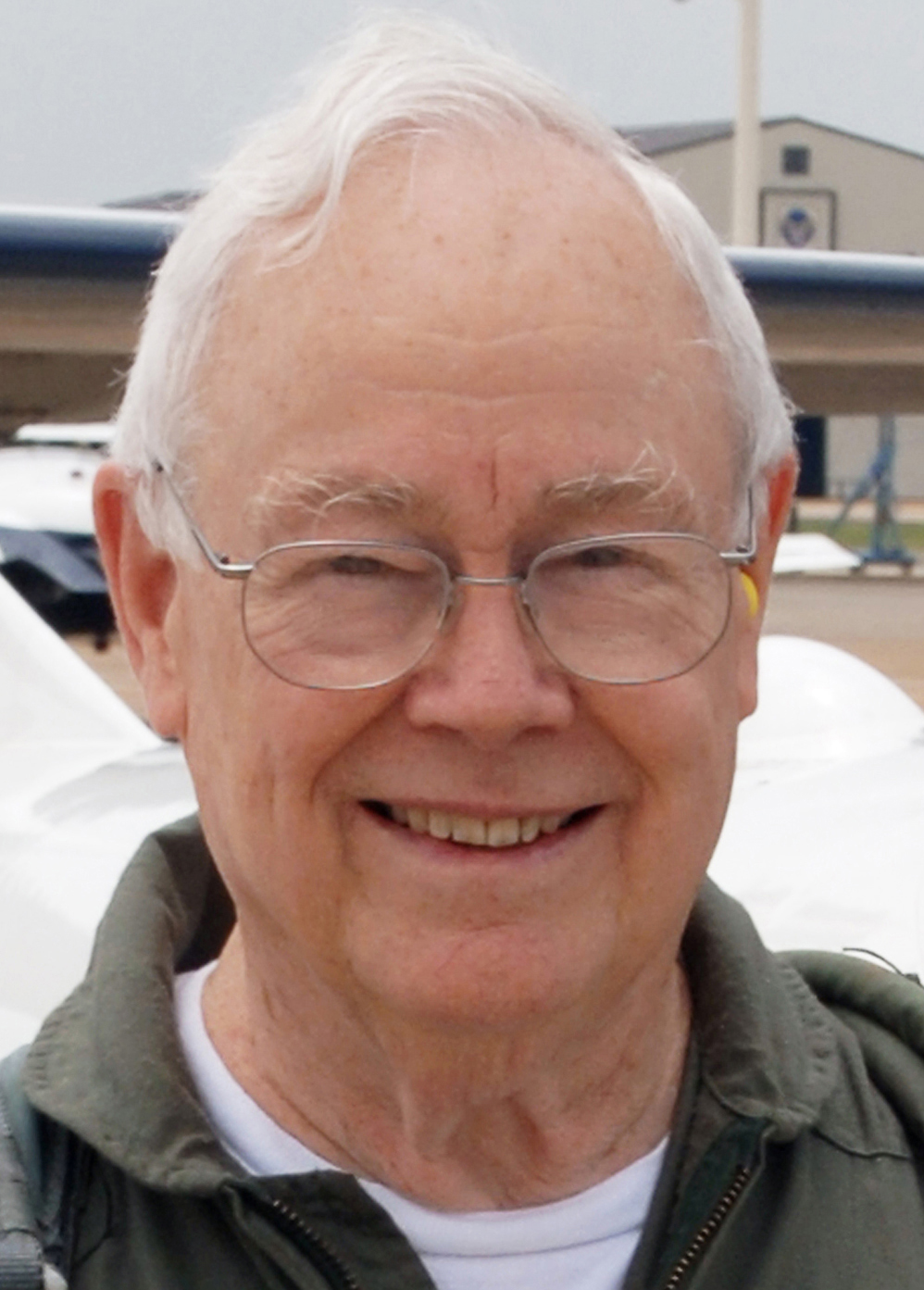
- Ferris in 2007
- Born: Carlisle Keith Ferris; May 14, 1929 (age 97); Honolulu
- Education: Texas A&M University, George Washington University, Corcoran College of Art
- Known for: Aviation art
- Spouse: Peggy Todd Ferris
- Elected: National Aviation Hall of Fame
- Website: keithferrisart.com

Keith Ferris (born May 14, 1929, Honolulu, Hawaii) is an aviation artist whose work is displayed at the Smithsonian Institution's National Air and Space Museum and the National Museum of the US Air Force and has been cited as the “Dean of American Aviation Art”. His work in aircraft camouflage has transformed the approach to painting US military aircraft.

== Biography ==
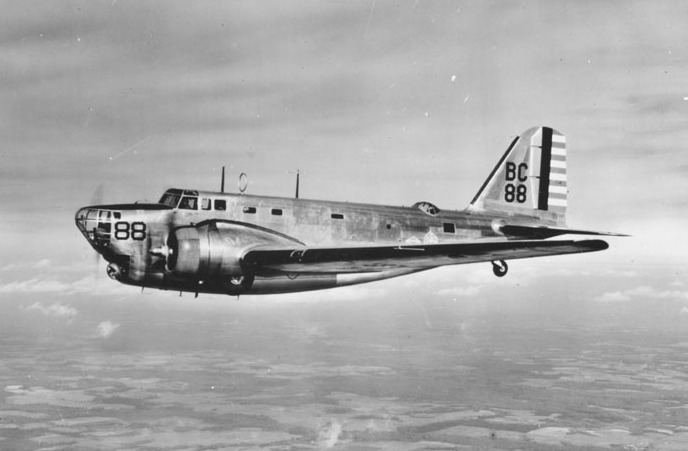
Douglas B-18A Bolo, the aircraft in which Ferris' father gave him his first flight on his tenth birthday.

Carlisle Keith Ferris was born on May 14, 1929, in Honolulu to Carlisle and Virginia (née Brecht) Ferris when his father was an Army Air Corps lieutenant stationed at the Luke Field, Ford Island in Pearl Harbor. In the same year, the father transferred to the Advanced Flying School at Kelly Field, Texas, as a flight instructor. There his parents had three more children.

His father was a combat pilot instructor for six years at Kelly Field, during which time Ferris became exposed to and interested in military aircraft. After the father's further advancement in the Army Air Corps, the family then moved to March Field, near Riverside, California. To celebrate his tenth birthday, Ferris' first flight was in a Douglas B-18A to which his father had been assigned.

In 1946, Ferris entered Texas A&M University to study aeronautical engineering and a hoped-for career path towards an Air Force commission. He encountered his first jet fighter at Randolph Air Force Base in Texas, while working in a summer job there. After learning that a minor allergy would make him ineligible to become a military pilot, he transferred to George Washington University, where he also studied anatomy and figure drawing at the Corcoran College of Art.

Upon completion of his studies, he moved to St. Louis in 1951 to work for firms with publications contracts for the United States Air Force. For five years he was in charge of producing artwork for training publications and nuclear weapons manuals until the Air Force closed that operation. He then moved to the New York area to become a freelance artist for the aerospace industry and the military.

He married Peggy Todd in 1953, while in St. Louis, which union produced a daughter and a son.

== Career ==
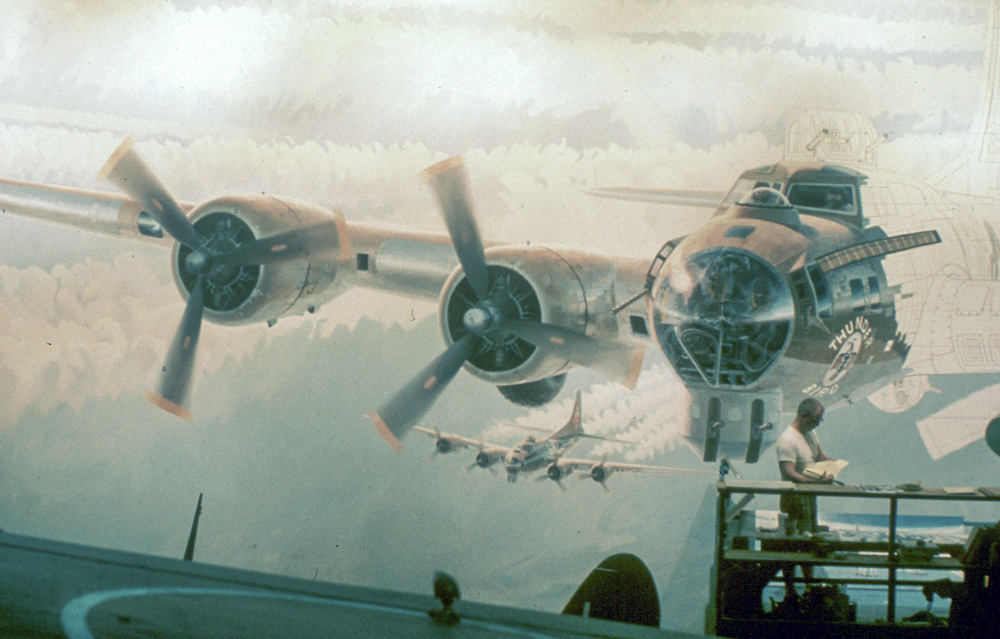
Ferris painting his "Fortresses Under Fire" mural at the Smithsonian National Air and Space Museum.

=== Aviation art ===
Ferris' work has been displayed at venues that include the Air Force Art Collection in The Pentagon, the Smithsonian National Air and Space Museum in Washington, D.C., and the National Museum of the U.S. Air Force; and in aviation art publications. The art director of Aviation Week & Space Technology cited "the power and the majesty of aviation in his paintings". A director of the National Air and Space Museum cited his "absolute fidelity to accuracy" and called him "the [Frederic] Remington of our time". A pilot and fellow artist said that his paintings "capture the impression of flight as a pilot would get: the airiness around you, the impression of movement". His work has influenced artists as far afield as Pakistan.

In a 1994 interview for AOPA Pilot magazine, Ferris suggested three rules of thumb for good aviation art:

1. Painting vs. photography: "If it can be handled by a photographer, I'm not interested in spending my time doing the same thing with paint."
2. From across a room: "If you can tell at a glance what is going on, what it is and what it is doing, then it is pretty good art".
3. Develop the shadows in aircraft imagery: "Airplanes are like a big mirror; they reflect the surrounding environment in their surfaces."

In a 2001 interview for The New York Times, Ferris highlighted the advantage of an artist over a photographer by pointing out that, as an artist he can start with nothing and using his imagination turn it into something, as opposed to a photographer who must have an object or scene to photograph. He further explained that his process of creating his works begins with a "debriefing" of his Air Force-sponsored travels to his wife, leading to thumbnail sketches, then to various views of the aircraft mission to be portrayed and finally to scaling all objects to appear in the scene using an engineering process called, ''perspective projection by descriptive geometry''; this includes careful consideration of the aircraft's flight path relative to the viewer's position. Key to the three dimensional effect is the handling of light and reflected light within the composition.

Ferris and his wife operate a small business, offering his original art and prints of his work for sale.

==== Air Force Art Program ====
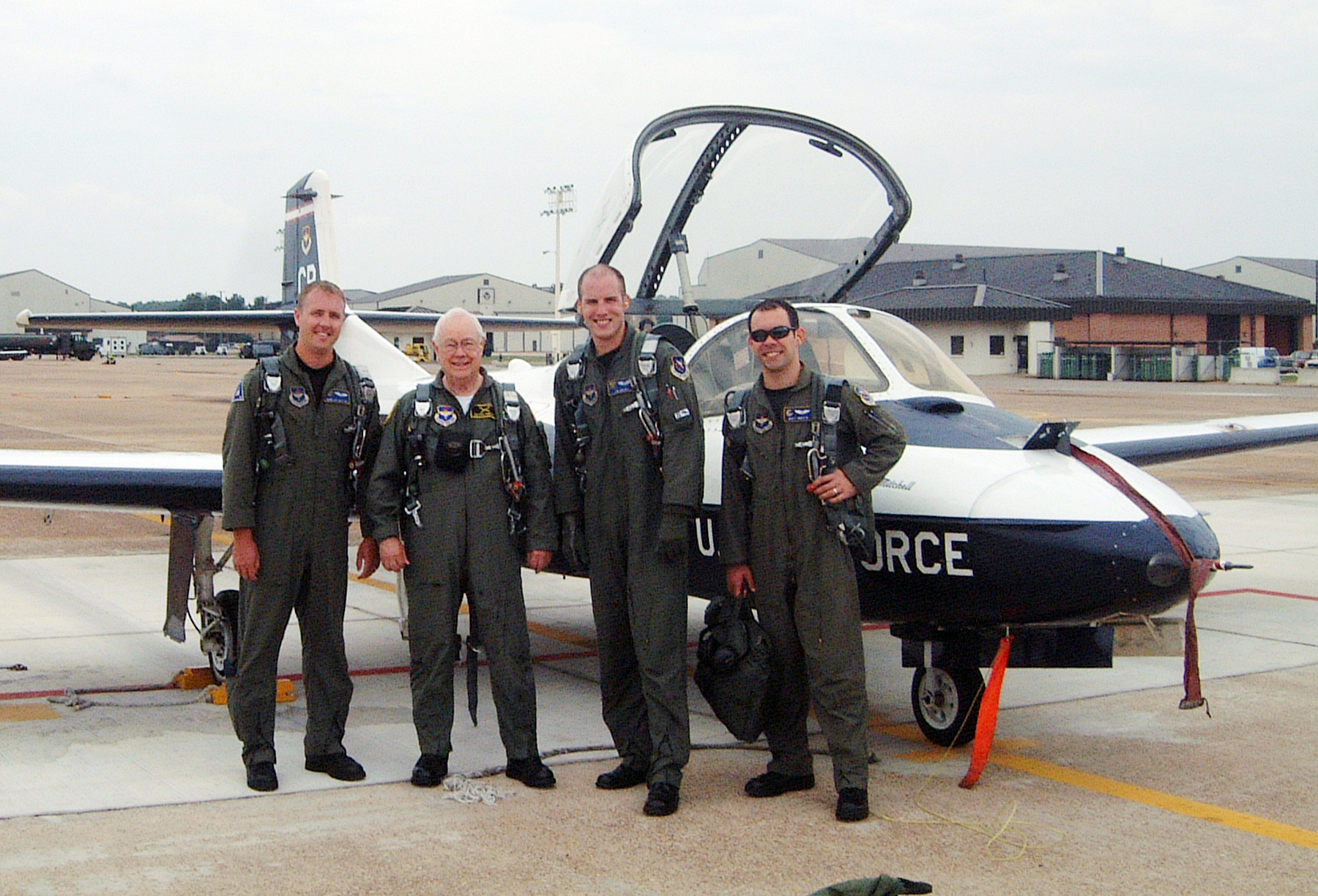
Ferris with three Air Force instructor pilots, following an Air Force Art Program flight.

His participation in the Air Force Art Program allowed Ferris to travel worldwide and to document the missions of many of the Air Force's jet aircraft, providing 62 major paintings to the collection. The program provided opportunities to fly in a wide variety of Air Force planes over more than 40 years, including in B-52s, the F-4E Phantom in Thailand, with the United States Air Force Thunderbirds flight demonstration team, and on Air Force missions during the Bosnian Conflict. His subject matter documents aviation history from World War I through the current era.

==== Murals ====
Ferris mural, "The Evolution of Jet Aviation", at the Smithsonian National Air and Space Museum

Ferris created two 75-foot-wide (23 m) murals for the Smithsonian Institution's National Air and Space Museum, "Fortresses Under Fire" in the museum's World War II gallery and "The Evolution of Jet Aviation" in the museum's Jet Aviation gallery.

His best-known work, the 25-foot-high (7.6 m) by 75-foot-wide (23 m) mural "Fortresses Under Fire", depicts with historical accuracy a World War II Boeing B-17 "Flying Fortress" bomber, named Thunderbird, under attack during its 70th mission on 15 August 1944. In a 1989 interview with The New York Times, Ferris described how he scaled up the working image, using a grid system—with fine squares for the working image and coarse squares for the mural—and completed each portion working from left to right, using correspondingly larger paint brushes. The mural took approximately 135 days of planning and 75 days of execution.

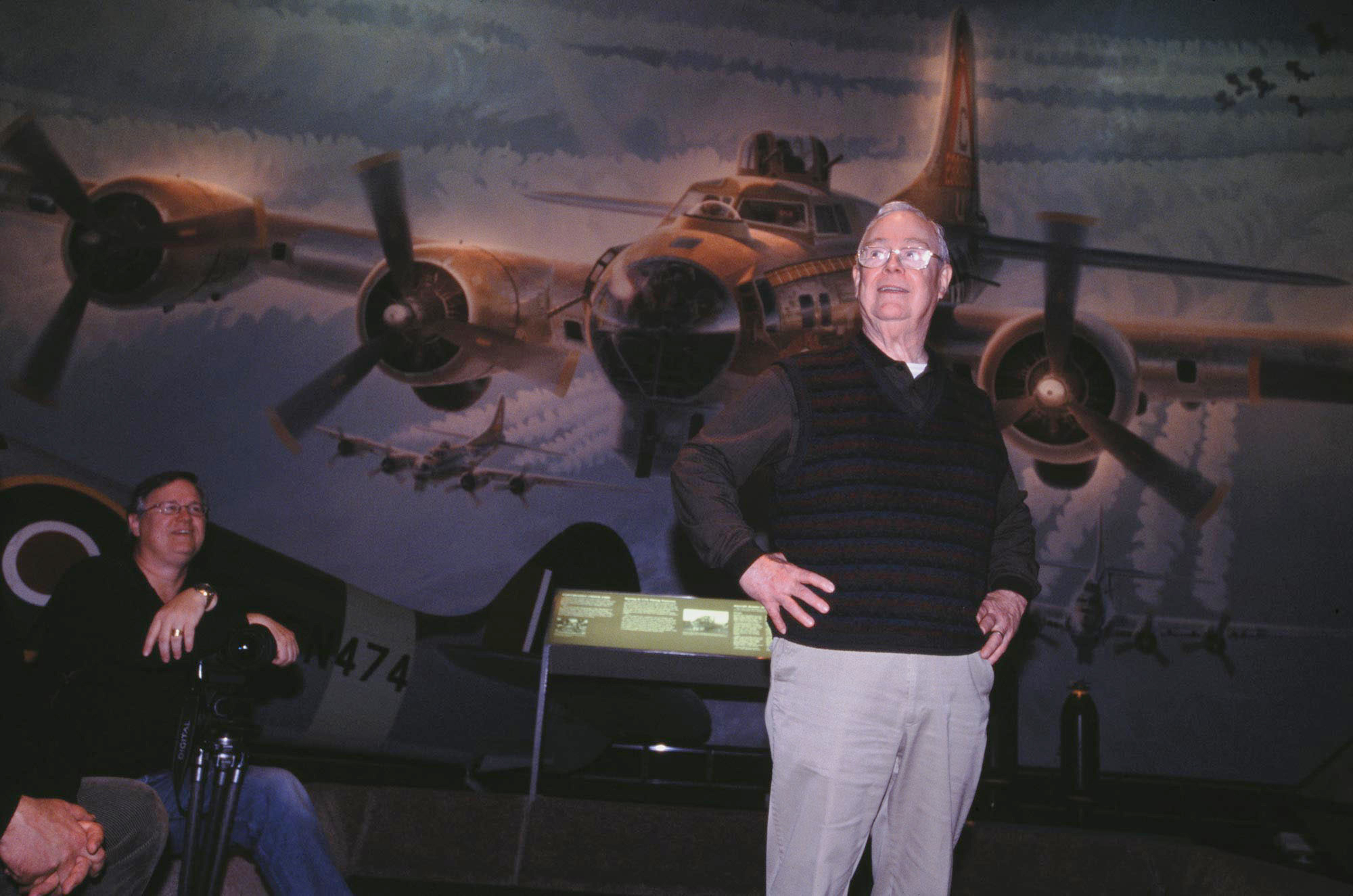
Ferris visits his mural “Fortresses Under Fire” at the National Air and Space Museum in 2005.

The second 75-foot-wide (23 m) mural, "The Evolution of Jet Aviation", depicts 27 historically significant jet aircraft, including the first and the fastest, and models from eight nations and from 20 aircraft manufacturers.

=== Professional societies ===
Ferris joined the Society of Illustrators in New York City in 1960, which introduced him to the Air Force Art Program. He is a founder and past president of the American Society of Aviation Artists, established with the stated goal to "promote professionalism, authenticity and quality in aviation art"; the society also provides scholarships, annual educational forums, advice on business practices, and opportunities for exhibition.

=== Camouflage ===
Ferris applied his knowledge of aircraft, his substantial experience with flying on missions in military aircraft, combined with his artistic talent, to developing several innovative camouflage patterns for military aircraft. He obtained five patents, covering these camouflage patterns. One design involved painting a false cockpit on the underside of an aircraft to make it more difficult for an adversary to determine which way the aircraft was turning. Another design, using disruptive coloration, entailed applying three shades of gray in a jagged pattern. Key principles included elimination of both bright colors and black from color schemes, the use of gray tones with a matte finish, the use of asymmetric patterns, and the de-emphasis of insignias. A third design principle creates visual confusion as an aircraft moves over a background. Ferris-inspired camouflage schemes have been implemented on foreign aircraft, as well.

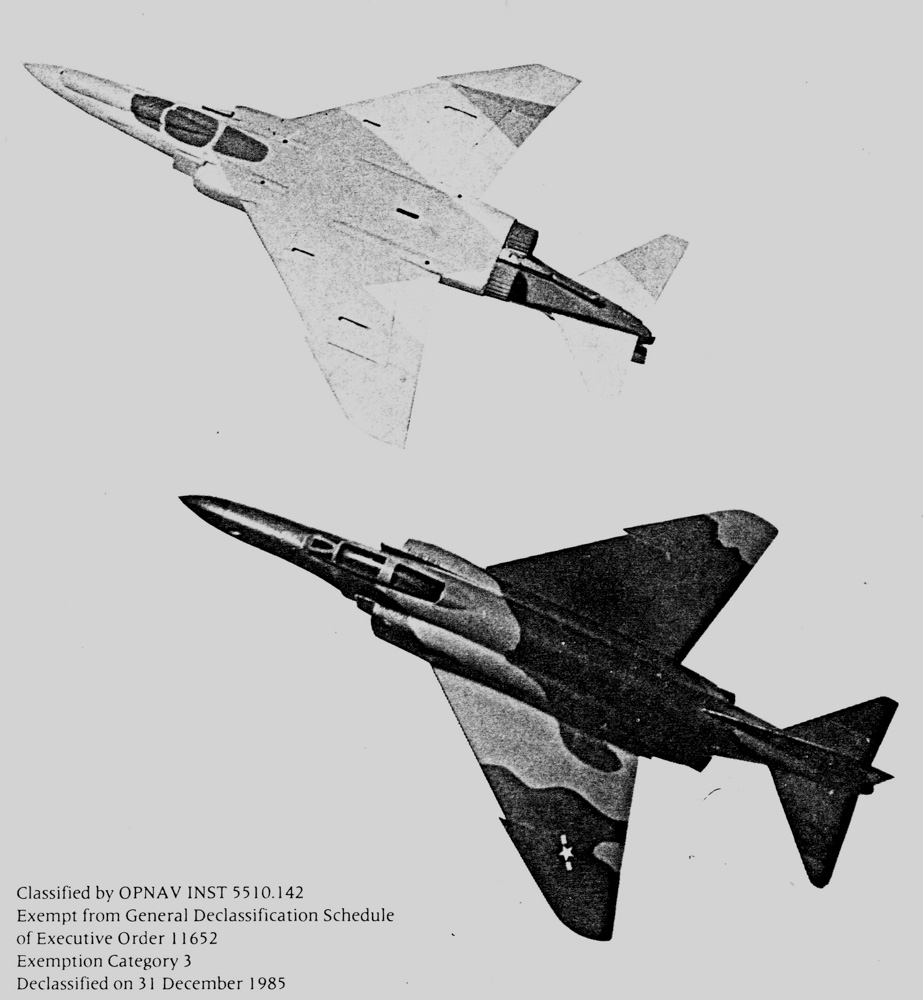
McDonnell Douglas F-4 Phantom II, depicting a disruptive gray camouflage scheme by Ferris (top), contrasted with a jungle coloration (bottom).

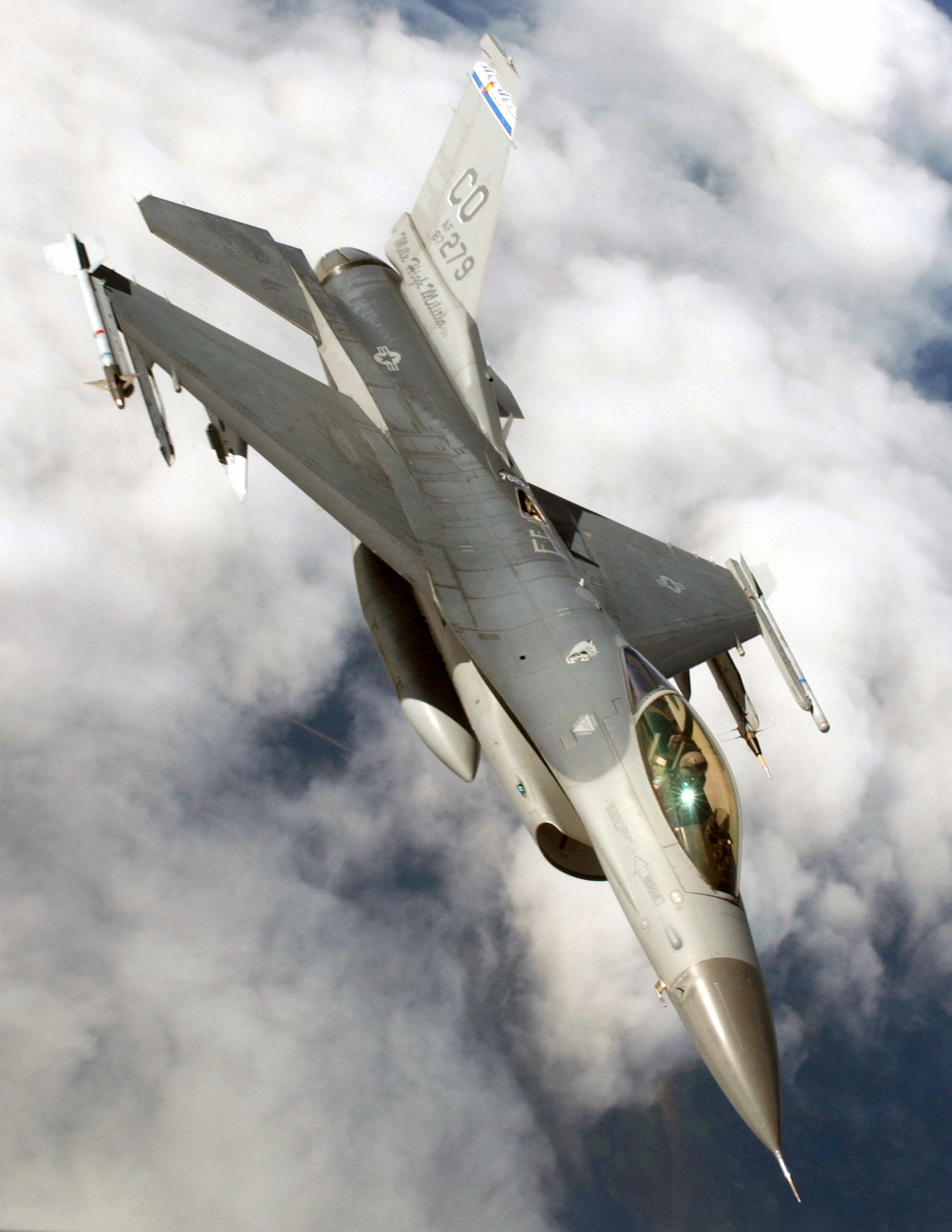
General Dynamics F-16, showing multi-shade pattern camouflage, influenced by Ferris.

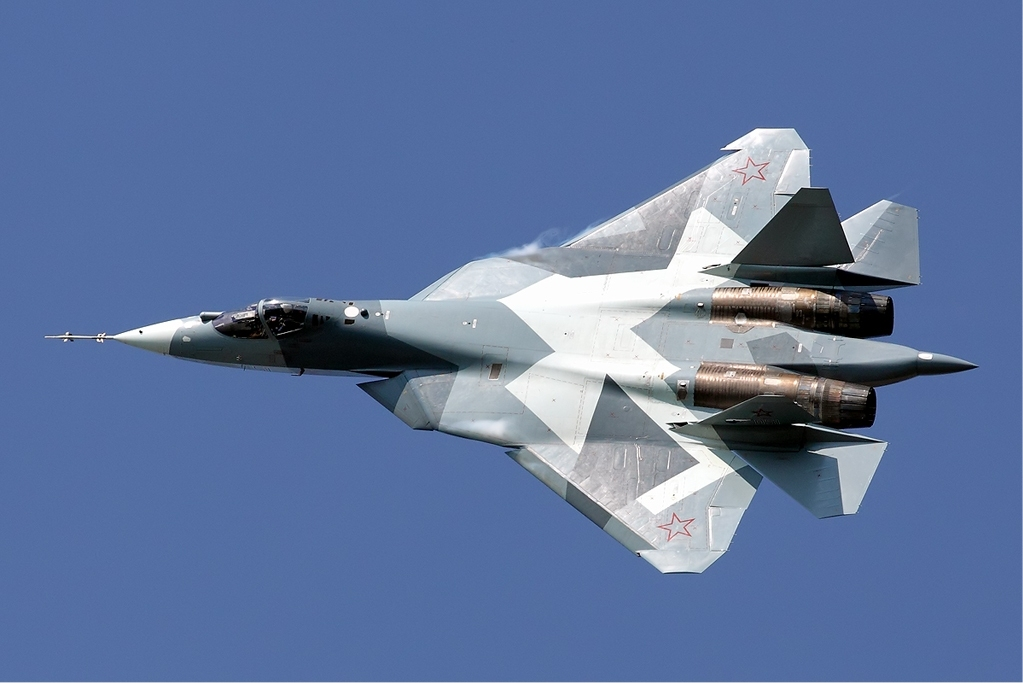
Russian Sukhoi Su-57, showing multi-shade pattern camouflage, influenced by Ferris.

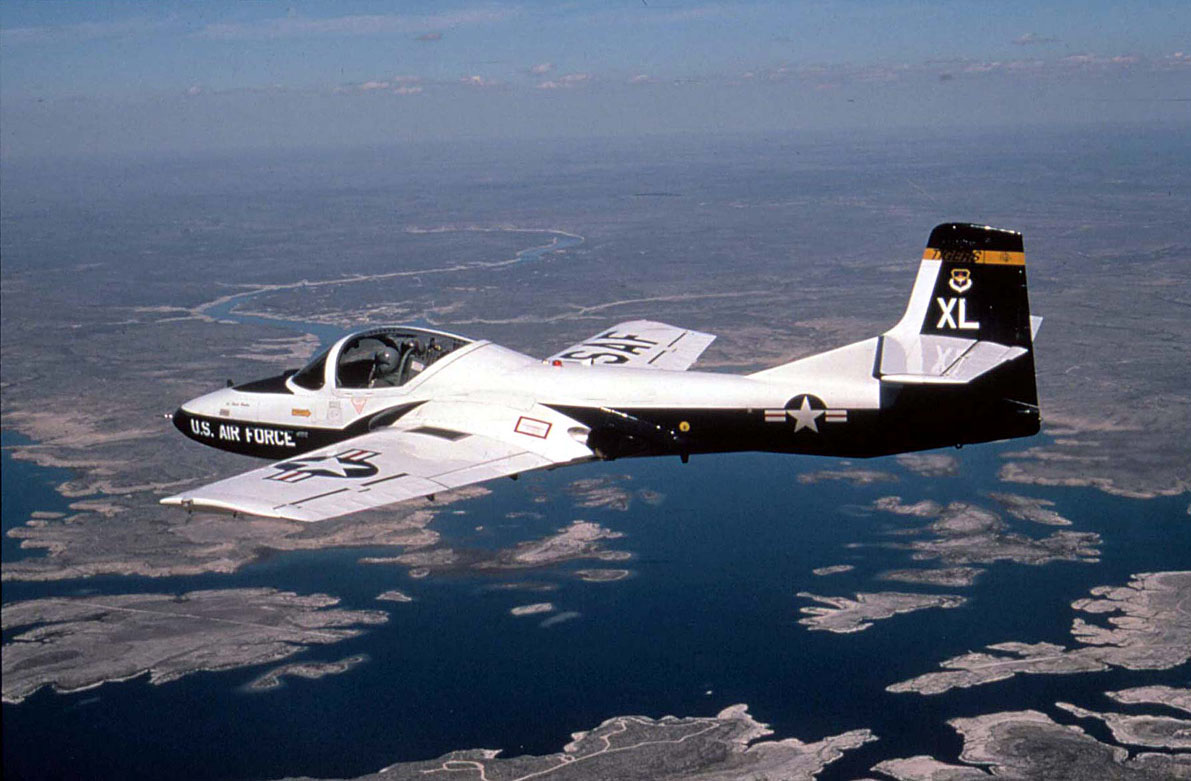
Air Force T-37 primary trainer with reversed countershading for maximum visibility, designed by Ferris

== Recognition ==
In 2012, Ferris was inducted into the National Aviation Hall of Fame, where he was cited as the “Dean of American Aviation Art” in recognition of his contributions as an artist, historian, aviator, inventor, and teacher.

In 1986 Ferris became an Honorary Daedalian—the national fraternity of military pilots, an honorary member of the USAF Thunderbirds in 1989, a 1992 inductee into the Aviation Hall of Fame and Museum of New Jersey, cited for Lifetime Achievement in 2004 in the Aviation Week & Space Technology Laureate Hall of Fame in the National Air & Space Museum in 2004, and a 2006 Hall of Fame inductee in The Society of Illustrators. In 2012, the National Aeronautic Association gave him a Distinguished Statesman of Aviation award and in 2014 Texas A&M gave him its Honorary Aerospace Engineering Engineer Alumni award. He received the Major General I.B. Holley Award in 2017 from the Air Force Historical Foundation in recognition of a "significant contribution to the documentation of Air Force history during a lifetime of service". Daniel Webster College in Nashua, New Hampshire, awarded him a Doctorate of Humane Letters in 1995.

His paintings that were selected as "Best of Show" at the American Society of Aviation Artists Annual Exhibition include:

- “Real Trouble” (1995)
- “First Trap” (1996)
- “Rolling Thunder” (1999)
- “Nowhere To Hide”(2000)

== Bibliography ==
- Ferris, K; Ballantine, I (1983). The aviation art of Keith Ferris. New York: Peacock Press/Bantam Books.

=== Patents ===
- Ferris, Carlisle Keith (May 16, 1978), Patent 4,089,491: Camouflaged aircraft, surface vessel or vehicle or the like, U.S. Patent Office
- Ferris, Carlisle K. (September 27, 1983), Patent 4,406,428: Camouflaged aircraft, U.S. Patent Office
- Ferris, Carlisle K. (September 16, 1986), Patent 4,611,524: Camouflaged vehicle such as an aircraft, surface vessel or the like, U.S. Patent Office

== See also ==
- Rudolph Belarski
- Gil Cohen (artist)
- Craig Slaff
