= List of surviving examples of mass-produced aircraft =

This is a list of surviving examples of mass-produced aircraft, specifically those that are notable solely or primarily for still existing. To illustrate, the Enola Gay is excluded from this list, but included in List of individual aircraft because it dropped the first atomic bomb.

Note: Period indicates when the aircraft was/is in flyable condition.

| Name or designation | Type | Role | Owner | Period | Notes |
|---|---|---|---|---|---|
| Aluminum Overcast | Boeing B-17 Flying Fortress | Bomber | Experimental Aircraft Association | 1945- | One of only ten flyable B-17s. |
| Avro Lancaster PA474 | Avro Lancaster | Bomber | Royal Air Force | 1945- | One of only two Lancasters in flying condition in the world. |
| Avro Vulcan XH558, aka Spirit of Great Britain | Avro Vulcan | Bomber | Vulcan To The Sky Trust | 1960-1993; 2007-2015 | The only Cold War/Falklands War-era Vulcan bomber to fly after 1986. Restored to flight in 2007. Finally grounded in 2015. |
| Douglas DC-7B N836D | Douglas DC-7B | Transport | | 1958-1965 (commercial use); 1965-2013 (private use) | |
| Douglas R4D-3 N763A | Douglas DC-3 | Transport | | 1942- | Used by the US Navy during World War II. Placed on the National Register of Historic Places in 1996. |
| FIFI | Boeing B-29 Superfortress | Bomber | Commemorative Air Force | 1942- | One of only two B-29s flying. |
| Glacier Girl | Lockheed P-38 Lightning | Fighter | | 1942 | Forced to land in Greenland in 1942 along with five other P-38s and two B-17s (including My Gal Sal, listed below). Recovered in 1992. |
| Hawker Hurricane PZ865 | Hawker Hurricane | Fighter | Royal Air Force | 1944- | Last Hurricane produced. Retained by Hawker Aircraft for trials work. Given by successor Hawker Siddeley to the Royal Air Force for its Battle of Britain Memorial Flight in 1972. |
| My Gal Sal | Boeing B-17 Flying Fortress | Bomber | | 1942 | Forced to land on the Greenland icecap during World War II and abandoned, along with another B-17 and six P-38s (among them Glacier Girl, listed above). Recovered in 1995 and restored. One of only three intact B-17Es. |
| Piccadilly Lilly II | Boeing B-17 Flying Fortress | Bomber | Edward T. Maloney | ?-1959; 1959-1971 | Last B-17 to serve in the US Air Force, flying her last mission in 1959. Used on TV shows, including Twelve O'Clock High, and at least one movie. |
| The Pink Lady | Boeing B-17 Flying Fortress | Bomber | United States Army Air Forces | 1944- | Only flying B-17 survivor to have seen action in Europe during World War II. |
| Sally B | Boeing B-17G Flying Fortress | Bomber | B-17 Preservation Ltd | 1945- | Only airworthy B-17 left in Europe. Used in the 1990 film Memphis Belle. |
| Sentimental Journey | Boeing B-17G Flying Fortress | Bomber | Commemorative Air Force | 1945- | Based at the Commemorative Air Force Museum in Mesa, Arizona, and regularly flown. |
| Shoo Shoo Baby | Boeing B-17 Flying Fortress | Bomber | | 1944-1961 | Crash-landed in Sweden in 1944. Restored from 1978 to 1988. |
| Swamp Ghost | Boeing B-17 Flying Fortress | Bomber | | 1941 | Ran out of fuel and crash-landed in a swamp in Papua New Guinea. Recovered in 1972. |
| Texas Raiders | Boeing B-17G Flying Fortress | Bomber | Commemorative Air Force | 1944-2022 | Maintained and flown by the Commemorative Air Force (formerly Confederate Air Force). (Destroyed in a midair collision with a P-63 Kingcobra at the "Wings Over Dallas" airshow, 11/12/22) |
| Thunderbird | Boeing B-17G Flying Fortress | Bomber | | 1943-1945 | Housed at the Lone Star Flight Museum in Galveston, Texas. |
| Worry Bird | North American P-51 Mustang | Fighter | | 1944-1957 (military use); in airworthy condition at the Air Combat Museum | Served in World War II and the Korean War before being retired in 1957 and passing into private hands. Listed on the National Register of Historic Places in 1999. |
| Yankee Lady | Boeing B-17 Flying Fortress | Bomber | Yankee Air Force | 1945- | Flyable. |

== See also ==
- List of surviving Avro Lancasters
- List of surviving Avro Vulcans
- List of displayed Bell AH-1 Cobras
- List of displayed Bell UH-1 Iroquois
- List of surviving Blackburn Buccaneers
- List of surviving Boeing B-17 Flying Fortresses
- List of surviving Boeing B-29 Superfortresses
- List of surviving Boeing B-47 Stratojets
- List of displayed Boeing B-52 Stratofortresses
- List of surviving Cessna T-37 Tweets
- List of surviving Consolidated B-24 Liberators
- List of surviving Consolidated PBY Catalinas
- List of surviving Curtiss P-40s
- List of surviving Curtiss C-46 Commandos
- List of surviving de Havilland Mosquitos
- List of surviving Douglas A-1 Skyraiders
- List of preserved Douglas A-4 Skyhawks
- List of surviving Douglas A-20 Havocs
- List of surviving Douglas A-26 Invaders
- List of surviving Focke-Wulf Fw 190s
- List of surviving Fokker D.VIIs
- List of surviving Folland Gnats
- List of surviving Gloster Meteors
- List of surviving Grumman F4F Wildcats
- List of displayed Grumman S-2 Trackers
- List of surviving Grumman TBF Avengers
- List of surviving Hawker Hurricanes
- List of airworthy Ju 52s
- List of surviving Lockheed F-104 Starfighters
- List of surviving Lockheed P-38 Lightnings
- List of surviving McDonnell F-101 Voodoos
- McDonnell Douglas F-4 Phantom IIs on display
- List of surviving Messerschmitt Bf 109s
- List of surviving North American B-25 Mitchells
- List of surviving North American P-51 Mustangs
- List of surviving Republic F-105 Thunderchiefs
- List of surviving Republic P-47 Thunderbolts
- List of surviving Saab 35 Drakens
- List of surviving Sabre aircraft
- List of surviving Sikorsky CH-54s
- List of surviving Supermarine Spitfires
- List of surviving Vought F4U Corsairs
