= List of surviving Cessna T-37 Tweets =

This is a list of surviving Cessna T-37 Tweets.

== Surviving aircraft ==
=== Norway ===
Display

T-37B

- 57-2247 - Norsk Luftartsmuseum (Norwegian Aviation Museum), Bodo AB (north-East side), Bodo, Nordland.

=== South Korea ===
Display

T-37C

- 73-1687 - Boramae Park Seoul, South Korea. The aircraft is painted in the colors of the ROKAF Black Eagles aerobatic team, although they operated the A-37B Dragonfly from 1994 to 2007 and are not known to have operated the T-37C.

=== United States ===
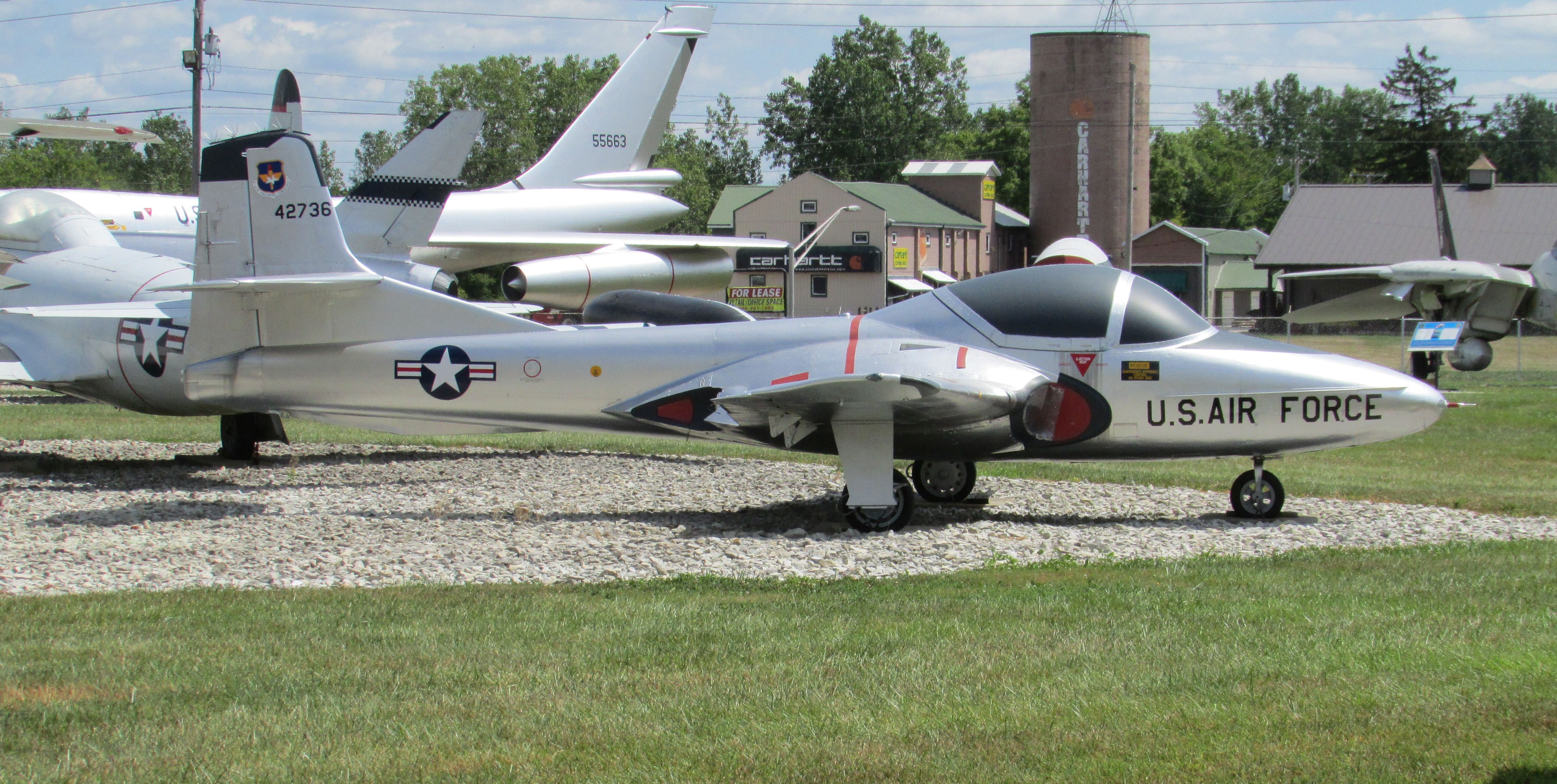
Cessna T-37B Tweet on display at the Grissom Air Museum, Peru, Indiana

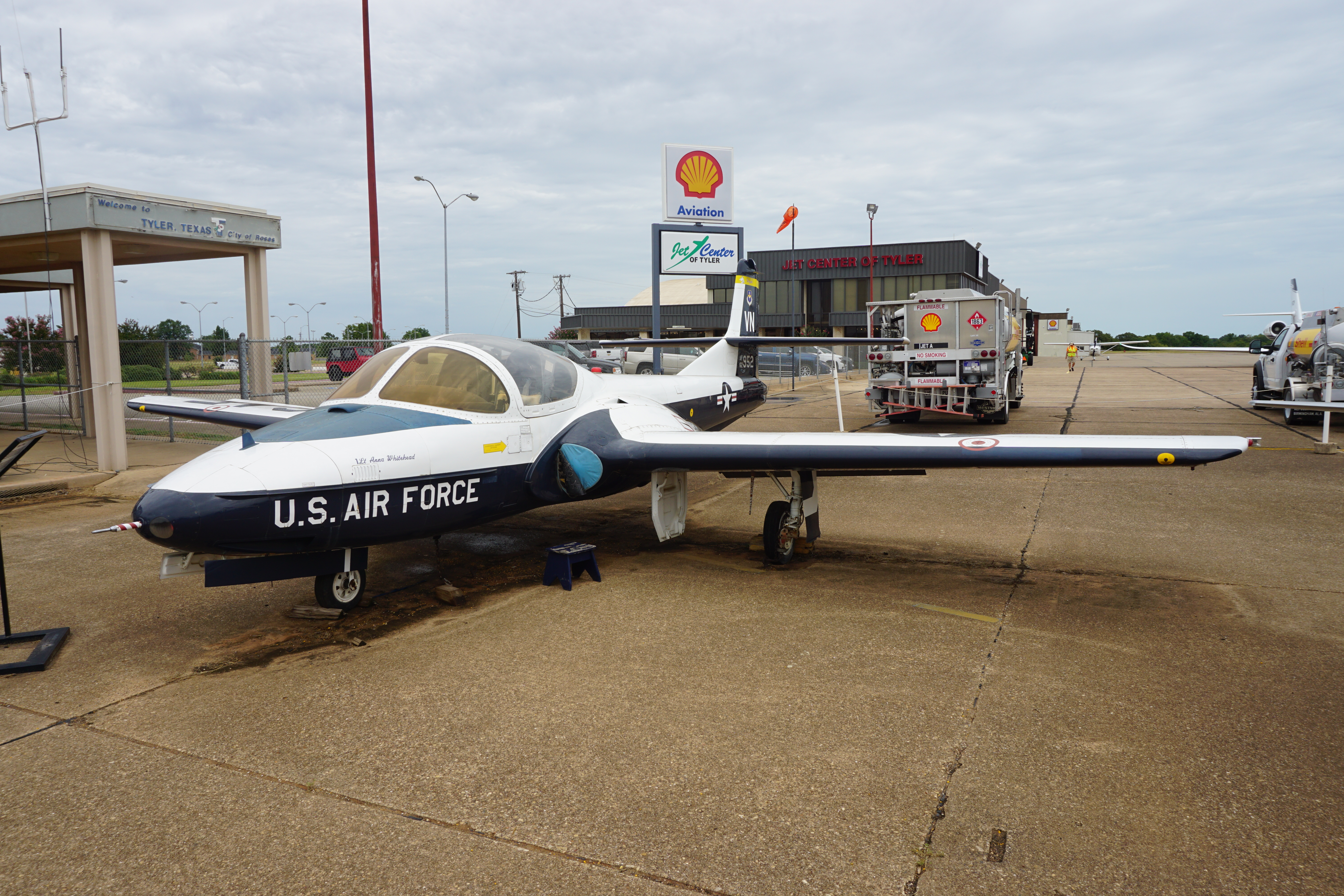
Cessna T-37B Tweet on display at the Historic Aviation Memorial Museum

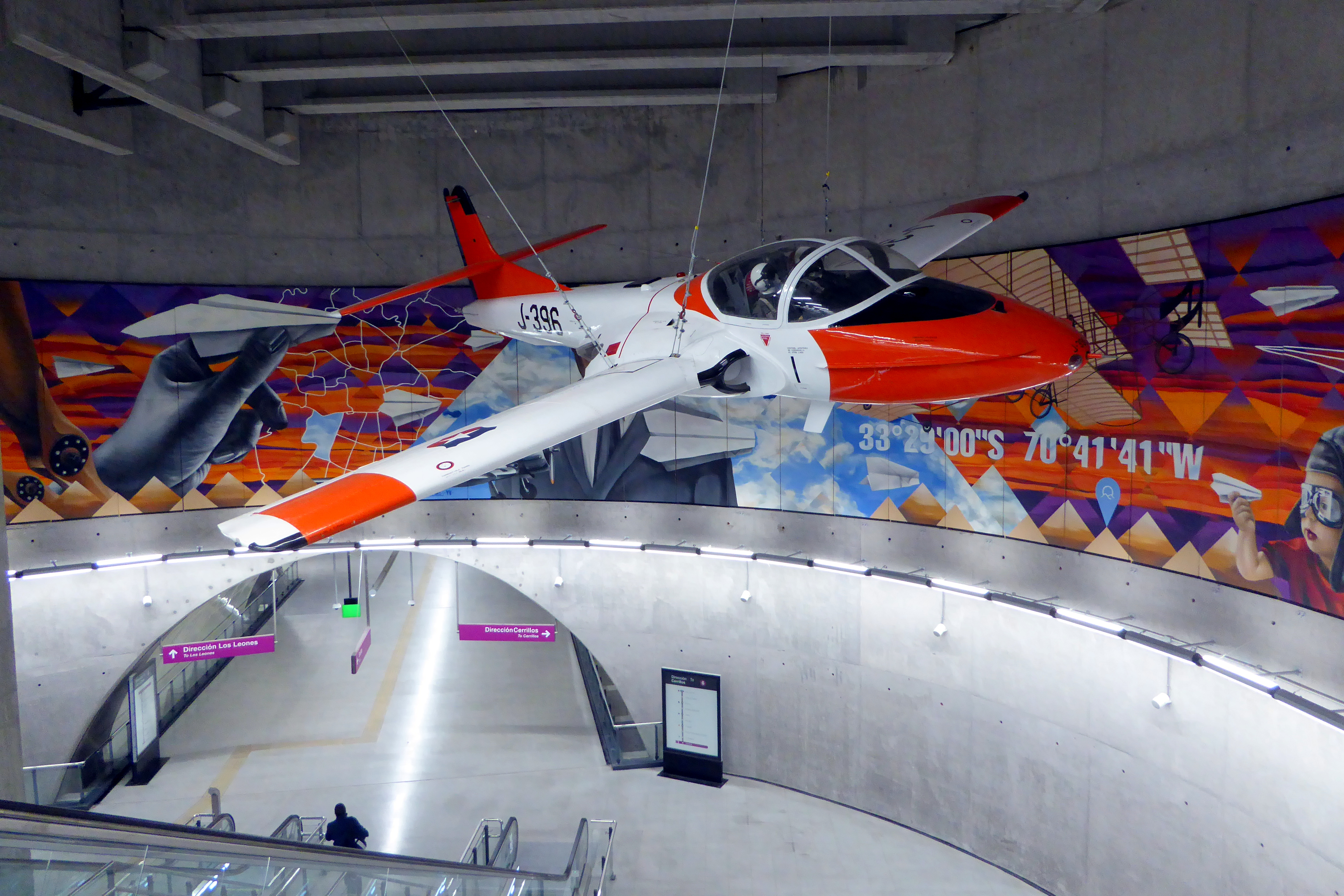
Cessna T-37 on hanging display at the Cerrillos metro station, Santiago, Chile

Airworthy

T-37C

- 66-13618 - privately owned in Delafield, Wisconsin.
- 66-13620 - privately owned in Dallas, Texas.

Display

XT-37

- 54-0718 - Mid-America Air Museum in Liberal, Kansas.

T-37B

- 54-2730 - Randolph Air Force Base in San Antonio, Texas.
- 54-2732 - MAPS Air Museum in Canton, Ohio.
- 54-2733 - Cherokee County Veterans Museum in Gaffney, South Carolina.
- 54-2734 - Dyess Linear Air Park at Dyess Air Force Base in Abilene, Texas.
- 54-2736 - Grissom Air Museum at Grissom Air Reserve Base in Peru, Indiana.
- 54-2739 - Laughlin Air Force Base in Del Rio, Texas.
- 55-4305 - Hangar 25 Air Museum at Big Spring McMahon-Wrinkle Airport (former Webb Air Force Base) in Big Spring, Texas.
- 56-3466 - US Army Aviation Museum, Fort Novosel, Ozark, Alabama.
- 56-3546 - Bartow Airport (former Bartow Air Base), Bartow, Florida.
- 56-3555 - Southern Museum of Flight in Birmingham, Alabama.
- 56-3563 - Jet, Oklahoma, adjacent to Kegelman Air Force Auxiliary Field, a training base for nearby Vance Air Force Base in Enid, Oklahoma.
- 57-2259 - Hill Aerospace Museum at Hill Air Force Base in Ogden, Utah.
- 57-2261 - Fort Worth Aviation Museum, Fort Worth, Texas.
- 57-2267 - Pima Air & Space Museum, adjacent to Davis-Monthan Air Force Base in Tucson, Arizona.
- 57-2289 - National Museum of the United States Air Force at Wright-Patterson Air Force Base in Dayton, Ohio.
- 57-2305 - Olympic Flight Museum in Olympia, Washington.
- 57-2316 - March Field Air Museum at March Air Reserve Base in Riverside, California.
- 57-2322 - Estrella Warbirds Museum in Paso Robles, California.
- 58-1914 - Columbus Air Force Base in Columbus, Mississippi.
- 58-1962 - Yanks Air Museum in Chino, California (awaiting restoration).
- 58-1977 - Kansas Aviation Museum in Wichita, Kansas
- 59-0274 - Columbus, Mississippi.
- 58-0289 - Yanks Air Museum in Chino, California (awaiting restoration).
- 59-0361 - Perrin Air Force Base Museum at North Texas Regional Airport (former Perrin Air Force Base) in Denison, Texas.
- 59-0383 - Commemorative Air Force Highland Lakes Squadron Air Museum (Hill County Squadron) in Burnet, Texas.
- 60-0100 - Museum of Aviation at Robins Air Force Base in Warner Robins, Georgia.
- 68-8050 - Vance Air Force Base, Enid, Oklahoma.
- (Unknown serial number) - Medford Municipal Airport, Medford, Oklahoma.

T-37C

- 62-5950 - Sheppard Air Force Base in Wichita Falls, Texas.
- 62-5952 - Historic Aviation Memorial Museum in Tyler, Texas.

=== Turkey ===
Display

T-37B

- 2-39839 - Eskişehir Büyükşehir Belediyesi Sazova Bilim Kültür Sanat Parkı.
