= List of displayed Bell AH-1 Cobras =

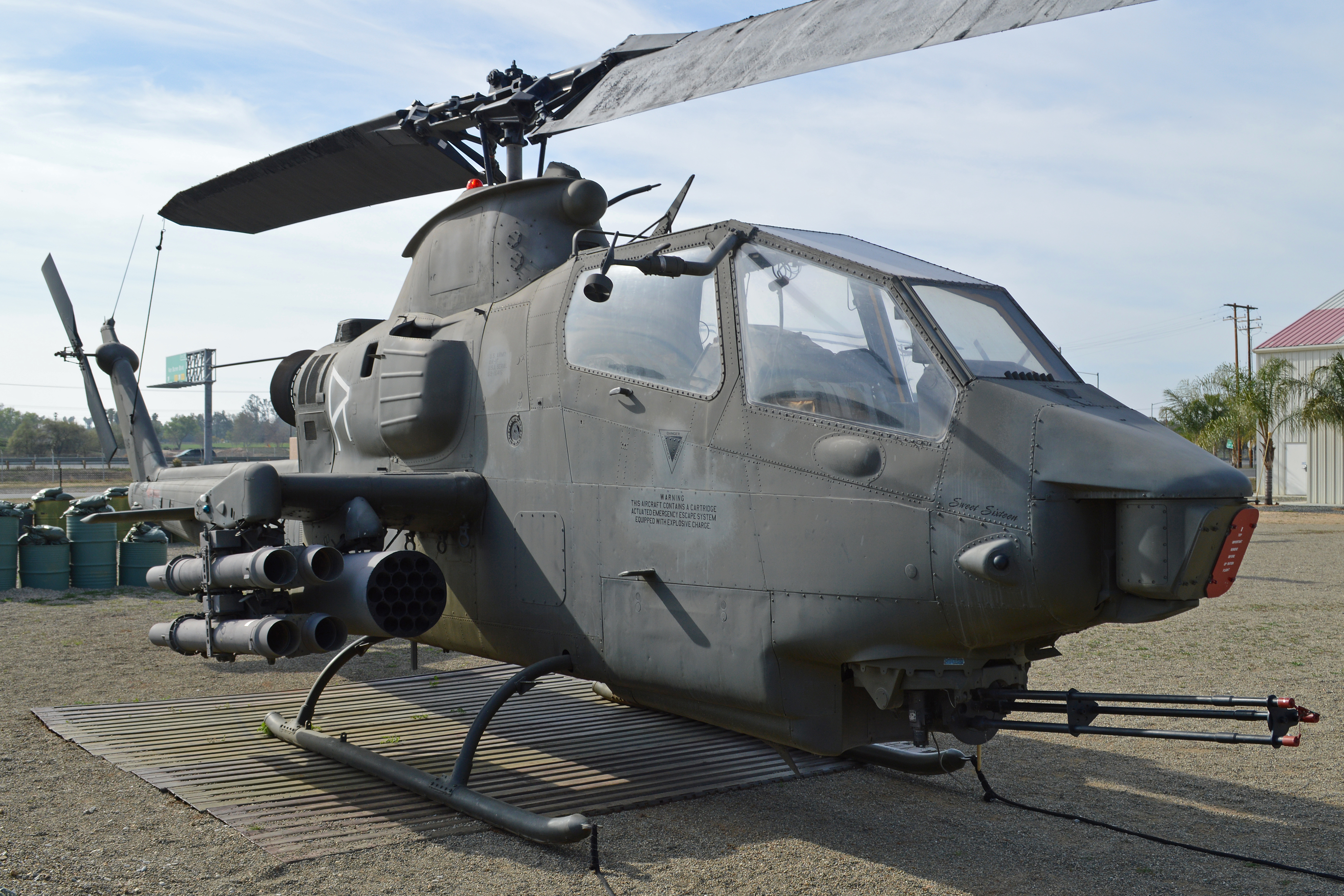
Bell AH-1F Cobra on display in California at March Field Museum

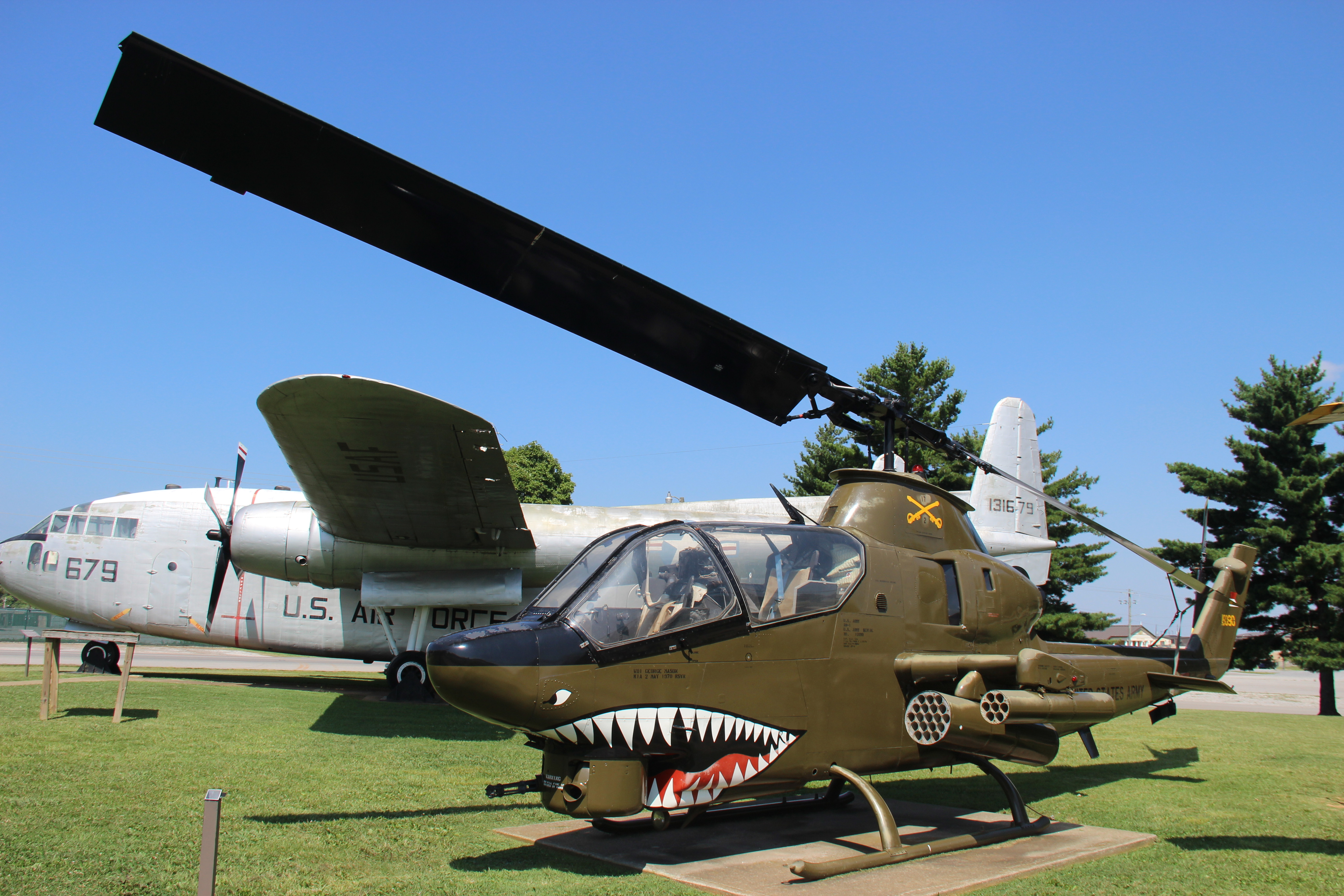
AH-1 on display

This is a list of displayed Bell AH-1 Cobra helicopters.

== Aircraft on display ==
=== Australia ===
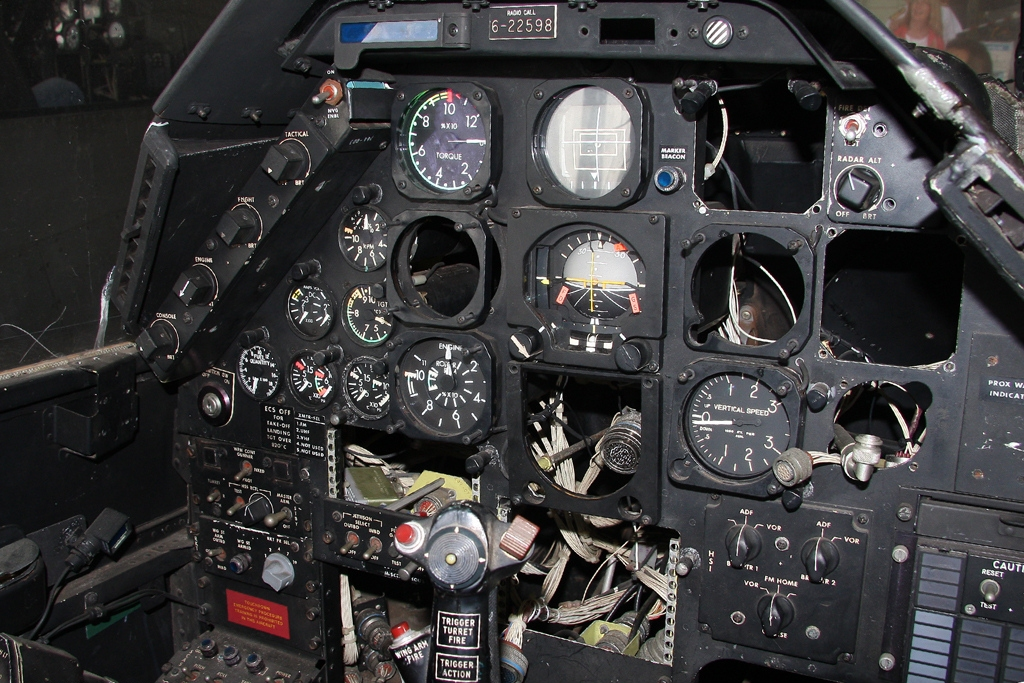
AH-1 at the Historical Aircraft Restoration Society in Wollongong, Australia.

AH-1S

- 76-22592 – Historical Aircraft Restoration Society in Albion Park Rail, New South Wales
- 76-22598 – Historical Aircraft Restoration Society in Albion Park Rail, New South Wales

=== Pakistan ===
AH-1F

- Pakistan Army Museum Lahore in Lahore Cantonment.

=== Spain ===
AH-1G

- 72-21464 – San Carlos base at San Fernando

=== United States ===
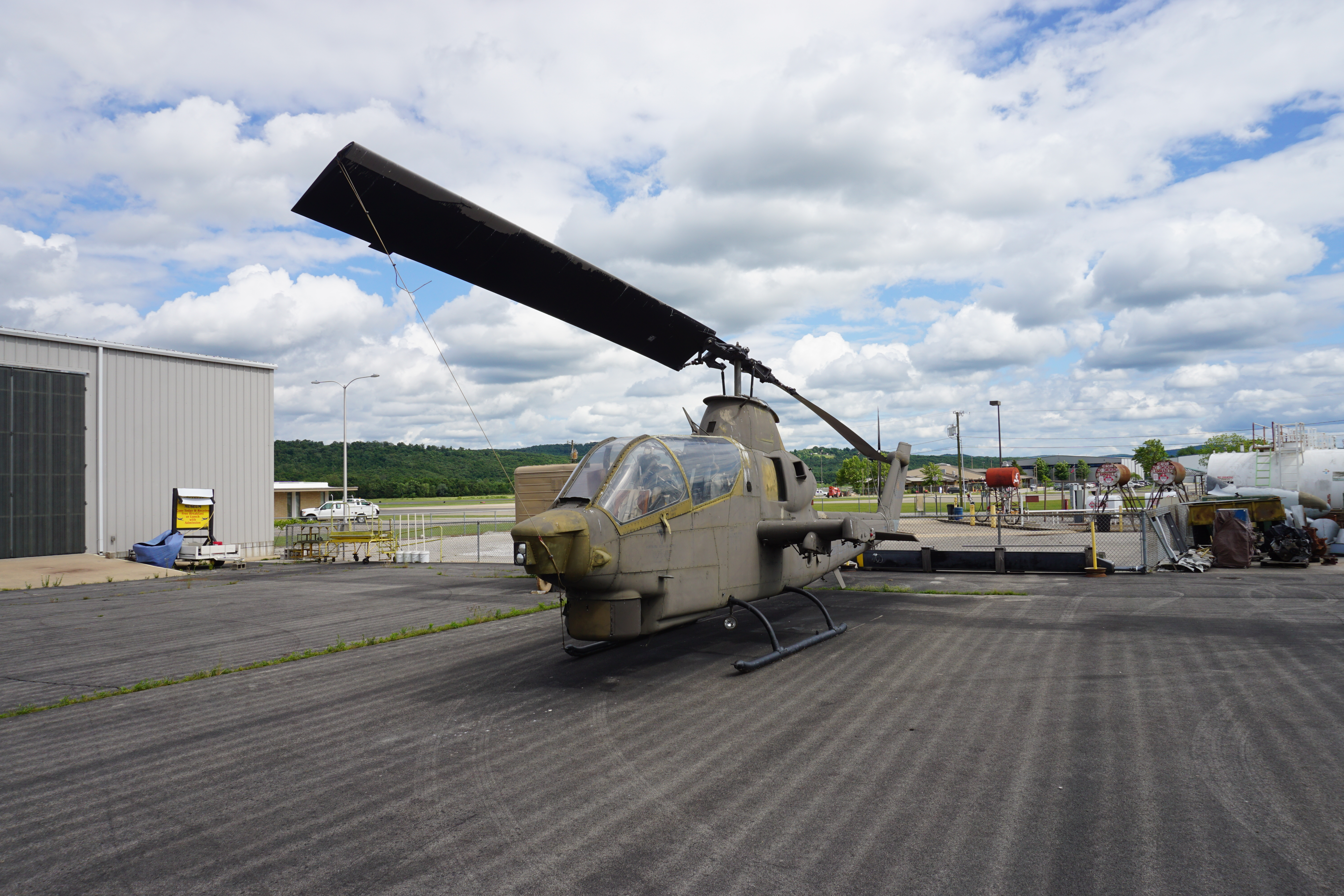
AH-1S at the Arkansas Air & Military Museum in Fayetteville, Arkansas

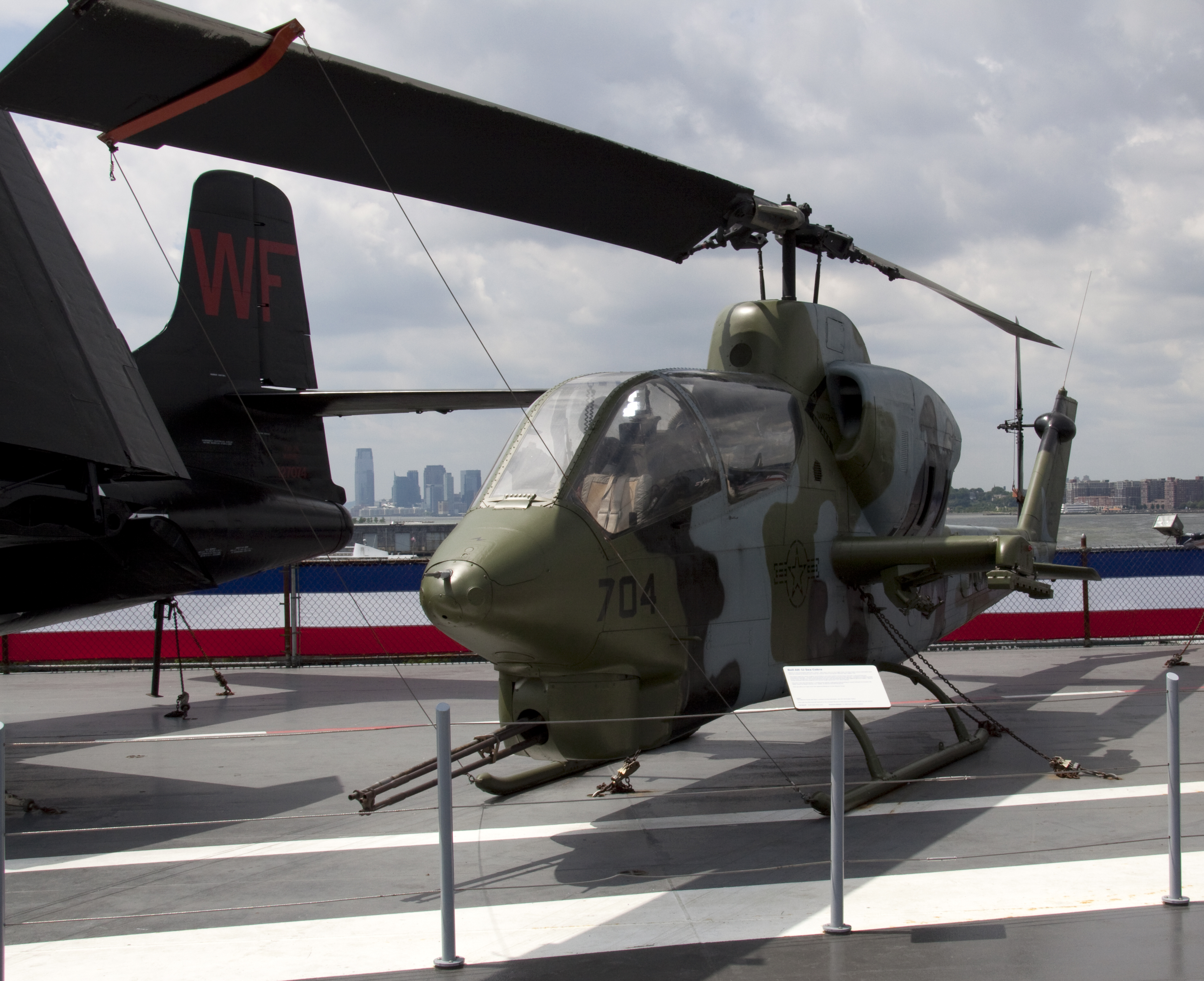
AH-J Sea Cobra

AH-1F

- 67-15535 - Camp Perry, Ohio
- 67-15508 - Steven F. Udvar-Hazy Center in Chantilly, Virginia
- 67-15720 – Hoosier Air Museum in Auburn, Indiana
- 68-15110 – New Hartford American Legion Post #1376 in New Hartford, New York
- 68-15138 – American Helicopter Museum & Education Center in West Chester, Pennsylvania
- 69-16416 – March Field Air Museum in Riverside, California
- 69-16434 – Evergreen Aviation & Space Museum in McMinnville, Oregon
- 69-16446 - Veterans of Foreign Wars Post 1419 in Hamburg, New York
- 70-15993 – Russell Military Museum in Zion, Illinois
- 81-23539 - American Legion Post #365, Collinsville, Illinois.

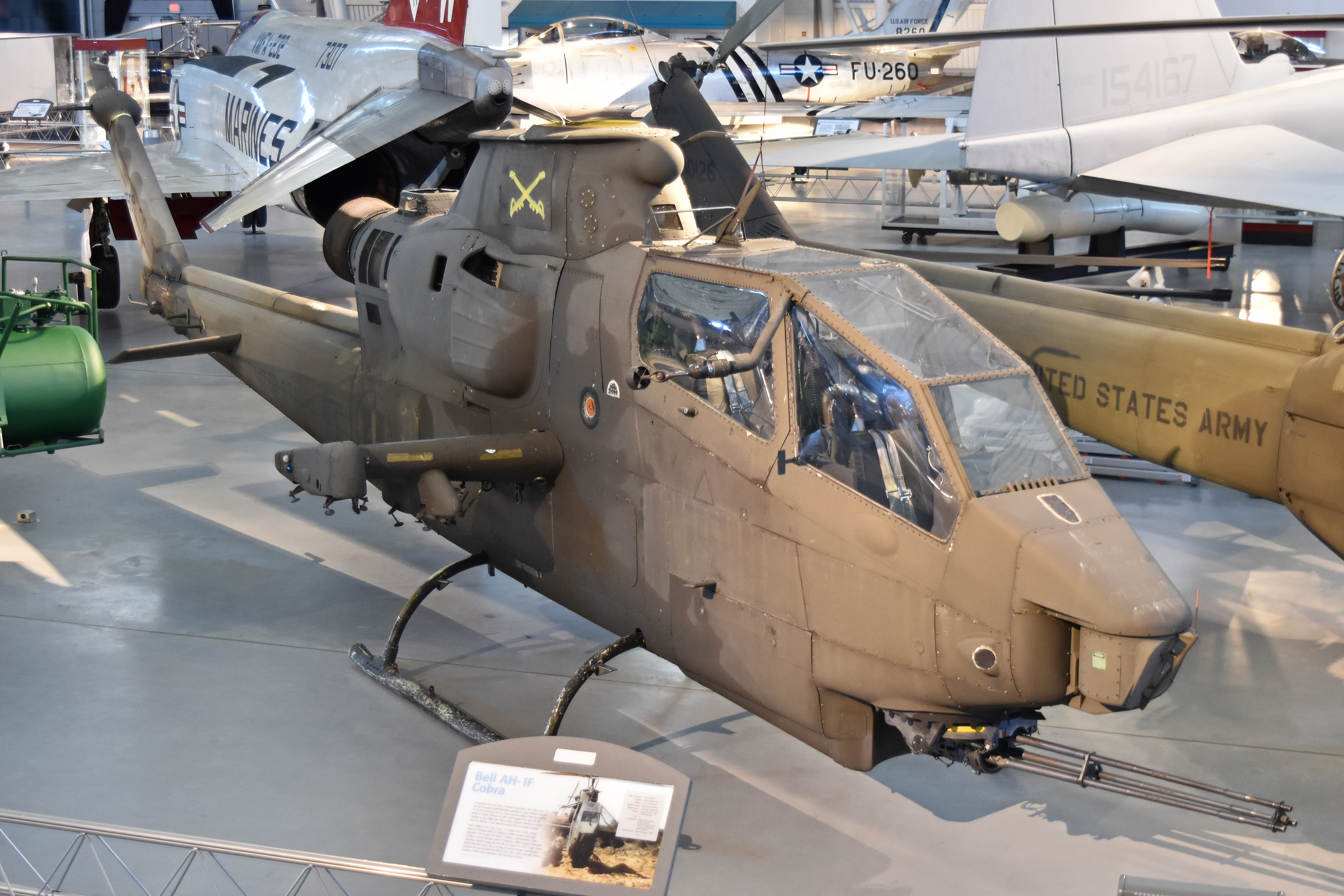
An AH-1F Cobra on display at the Steven F. Udvar-Hazy Center

AH-1G

- 66-15298 – Pearl Harbor Aviation Museum on Ford Island, Hawaii
- 67-15574 – Palm Springs Air Museum in Palm Springs, California
- 67-15642 – Veterans Memorial Park of Collegedale, Tennessee
- 67-15675 – Selfridge Military Air Museum in Harrison Township, Michigan
- 70-16084 – MAPS Air Museum in North Canton, Ohio
- 70-16086 – Air and Military Museum of the Ozarks in Springfield, Missouri
- 71-21047 – Southern Museum of Flight in Birmingham, Alabama

AH-1S

- 67-15546 – Arkansas Air & Military Museum in Fayetteville, Arkansas
- 68-15153 – Texas Military Forces Museum in Austin, Texas
- 70-15155 – Moffett Historical Museum, Moffett Federal Airfield, California
- 70-15940 – U.S. Veterans Memorial Museum, Huntsville, Alabama
- 70-15981 – New England Air Museum in Windsor Locks, Connecticut
- 70-15985 – Pima Air and Space Museum in Tucson, Arizona
- 72-22754 – USS Lexington Museum on the Bay in Corpus Christi, Texas
- 77-22791 – Olympic Flight Museum in Olympia, Washington

Under Restoration

AH-1F

- 66-15295 - to airworthiness by Army Aviation Heritage Foundation and Flying Museum in Hampton, Georgia.
- 67-15481 - to airworthiness by Army Aviation Heritage Foundation and Flying Museum in Hampton, Georgia.
- 67-15854 - to airworthiness by Army Aviation Heritage Foundation and Flying Museum in Hampton, Georgia.
- 68-17082 - to airworthiness by Army Aviation Heritage Foundation and Flying Museum in Hampton, Georgia.
- 68-17083 - Veterans Memorial Museum in Chehalis, Washington
- 70-15942 - to airworthiness by Army Aviation Heritage Foundation and Flying Museum in Hampton, Georgia.
- 79-23195 - to airworthiness by Army Aviation Heritage Foundation and Flying Museum in Hampton, Georgia.

AH-1S

- 66-15352 - to airworthiness by Celebrade Freedom Foundation in Columbia, South Carolina
- 67-15520 - to airworthiness by Celebrate Freedom Foundation in Columbia, South Carolina
- 76-22567 - to airworthiness by Celebrate Freedom Foundation in Columbia, South Carolina
- 79-23211 - to airworthiness by Celebrate Freedom Foundation in Columbia, South Carolina
