= List of surviving Boeing B-47 Stratojets =

The Boeing B-47 Stratojet is an American jet-engine Strategic Bomber used by the United States Air Force from 1951 until 1977. Of the 2,032 aircraft built, 22 survive today, none of which are airworthy. All are located in the United States.

== Surviving aircraft ==
Serial	Geographic location	Institutional location	History	Photo
46-66	(United States) Southern California	Air Force Flight Test Museum	Built at Boeing Seattle as XB-47. The second XB-47 built, after 46-65. First flight 21 July 1948. Test flown at Edwards AFB. In 1954 46-65 was scrapped, making 46-66 the oldest B-47 in existence, and the only surviving XB-47. Previously displayed at the since-closed Octave Chanute Aerospace Museum at the former Chanute AFB, Illinois. Returned to Edwards AFB in 2016. Awaiting funds for restoration.	
50-0062	(United States) Pooler, Georgia	National Museum of the Mighty Eighth Air Force	Built at Boeing Wichita as B-47B. In 1954 redesignated as a TB-47B . Used in 1957 as JTB-47B, and immediately after re-converted to TB-47B. Designated as museum aircraft in 1961 (also redesignated as NTB-47B in 1961). Sent to since-closed Florence Air & Missile Museum in Florence, South Carolina in 1965. Sent to Mighty Eighth Air Force Museum in Pooler, Georgia in 1998.	
51-2075	(United States) Southern California	Air Force Flight Test Center, Edwards AFB	Built as a B-47B. Redesignated EB-47B then JB-47B Jan 1956, TB-47B Feb 1956, and JTB-47B Mar 1956. Subsequently, updated and redesignated TB-47B again. Put on display at Air Force Flight Test Center Museum, Edwards, AFB, California. Later put out on bombing range at Edwards AFB to be used as a photographic target.	
51-2120	(United States) Knob Noster, Missouri	Whiteman AFB	Built as a B-47B. Operated by SAC's 509 BW.	
51-2315	(United States) Peru, Indiana	Grissom Air Museum	Built as a B-47B. Observed at Grissom 1996 wearing false serial 20271. However, 51-2315 was in a major accident prior to 1968. 52-0271 was indeed at Bunker Hill AFB (later Grissom AFB), and maybe this plane is actually the real 52-0271? The plane now bears the markings 12315 and a sign says that the plane broke its back on a hard landing at Bunker Hill AFB, which forced its retirement, so it may well be the real 51-2315.	
51-2387	(United States) Wichita, Kansas	Kansas Aviation Museum	Built as a B-47E (later converted to a WB-47E). Was on display at Oklahoma City Fair Grounds, Oklahoma City. In 2007 moved to Kansas Aviation Museum.	
51-7066	(United States) Seattle, Washington	Museum of Flight	Built as a B-47E (later converted to a WB-47E). Restored to SAC bomber configuration for display.	
51-7071	(United States) Altus, Oklahoma	Hightower Park	Built as a B-47E. Former 96th Bombardment Wing, Medium aircraft. On display at Hightower Park, Altus, Oklahoma, marked as 520413. Manufacturer's plate shows MSN to be 450595, which may mean that the plane is not 51-7071 but 51-7052.	
52-0166	(United States) Atwater, California	Castle Air Museum	Built by Douglas-Tulsa as a B-47E. Strategic Air Command operated by the 9th Bombardment Wing, 509th Bombardment Wing, Medium & 40th Bomb Wing, Medium; last used by the United States Navy as a photographic training target at NAWS China Lake, California. Performed the last flight of a B-47 in June 1986 from NAWS China Lake to Castle AFB.	
52-0412	(United States) Abilene, Texas	Dyess AFB	Built as a B-47E (later converted to EB-47E); later operated by the US Navy's Fleet Electronic Warfare Support Group(FEWSG) as a Government Owned/Contractor Operated aircraft (with tail # 24120) until retired in 1977.	
52-0595	(United States) Little Rock, Arkansas	Little Rock AFB	Built as a B-47E.	
52-1412	(United States) Ashland, Nebraska	Strategic Air Command and Aerospace Museum	Built at Douglas-Tulsa as a B-47E (later converted to EB-47E). Assigned to the 301st Bombardment Wing, 97th Bombardment Wing, 384th Bombardment Wing, 321st Bombardment Wing, and 70th Bombardment Wing prior to its retirement in 1964.	110x100
53-2104	(United States) Pueblo, Colorado	Pueblo Weisbrod Aircraft Museum	Built as a B-47E. Last role was as a TF34 engine testbed designated a NB-47E. Civil registered for delivery flight to Pueblo Memorial Airport in 1979. Was at one time loaned to the Navy as 532104.	
53-2135	(United States) Tucson, Arizona	Pima Air and Space Museum	Built by Douglas-Tulsa as a B-47E (later converted to EB-47E). Sent to Military Aircraft Storage and Disposal Center (MASDC) 8 Dec 1964; now at Pima Air and Space Museum. Formerly operated by the 376th Bombardment Wing, Medium.	
53-2275	(United States) Riverside, California	March Field Air Museum	Built as a B-47E. It was used by the USN and was retired to China Lake, California, from where it was moved to March Field Air Museum sometime after 1986. Was once or still known as "Betty-Boop."	
53-2276	(United States) Bossier City, Louisiana	Barksdale Global Power Museum	Built as a B-47E (later converted to JB-47E). Former 303rd Bombardment Wing, Medium aircraft.	
53-2280	(United States) Albuquerque, New Mexico	National Museum of Nuclear Science and History	Built as a B-47E. In the 1960s this aircraft was used as a test bed at Wright-Patterson Air Force Base under the designation JB-47E. It was the first USAF aircraft with a fly-by-wire control system. Transferred to the NMUSAF in 1969 and displayed until 2003. In 2013 it was transferred to the National Museum of Nuclear Science & History in Albuquerque, New Mexico for permanent display.	
53-2385	(United States) Plattsburgh, New York	Clyde Lewis Air Park	Built as a B-47E. Its only role during its service life was as a strategic bomber. Pride of the Adirondacks was dedicated as a permanent monument on March 21, 1966 in conjunction with SAC's 20th Anniversary. It is currently on display at the Clyde Lewis Air Park. During the 1965 SAC World Series of Bombing held at Fairchild AFB it took top honors in the B-47 division. Pride is being restored by Plattsburgh Aircraft Restoration, a volunteer group consisting of military retirees, veterans and family members. It is now wheelchair accessible due to considerable support from local businesses.	
53-4213	(United States) Wichita, Kansas	McConnell AFB	Built as a B-47E. Operated by Strategic Air Command's 98th Bombardment Wing, Medium & 308th Bombardment Wing, Medium. One of the last B-47s operated at the former Lincoln AFB, Nebraska before departing on 7 December 1965; 53-4213 participated in Operation "Fast Fly" which was the retirement of the last B-47s in USAF service. Was on display at Wichita, Kansas- Air Capital Park 1965–1988. Moved to McConnell AFB, Kansas in 1988.	
53-4257	(United States) Oklahoma City, Oklahoma	Tinker AFB	Built as a RB-47E (later converted to JRB-47E, then to NRB-47E).	
53-4296	(United States) Valparaiso, Florida	Air Force Armament Museum	Built as a RB-47H. Former 55th SRW aircraft; returned to duty from MASDC, Davis-Monthan AFB, for tests of F-111 radar system by the Air Force Avionics Laboratory (July 1968). In 1978, was preserved at US Coast Guard Station, Los Angeles. Now at Air Force Armament Museum, Eglin AFB; RB-47 nose and F-111 radome replaced by standard B-47E nose, making it a bastardized configuration.	
53-4299	(United States) Dayton, Ohio	National Museum of the United States Air Force	This RB-47H was delivered to the USAF in October 1955. The aircraft served with the 55th Strategic Reconnaissance Wing from 1955 until its retirement in 1966. It was deployed to several locations, including Incirlik Air Base, Turkey, and Yokota Air Base, Japan. It also flew missions over the former Soviet Union. The aircraft was delivered to the museum in 1998. After extensive restoration by museum personnel, it went on display in 2003, marked as it appeared in 1960.	
