= List of surviving Curtiss C-46 Commandos =

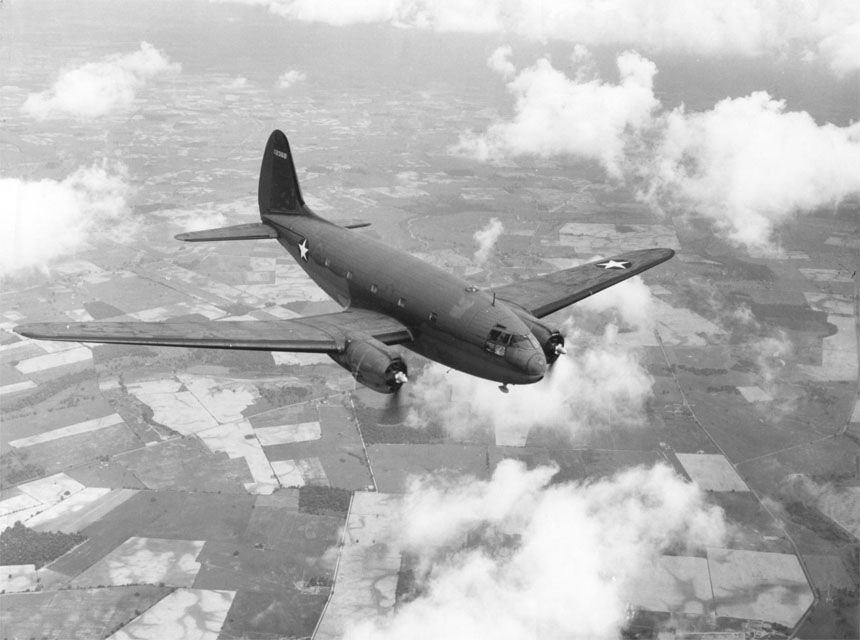
C-46 Commando in flight

This is a list of surviving Curtiss C-46 Commandos, including both airworthy and on display or stored aircraft.

== Flying units ==
As of Feb 2025, there are six airworthy examples remaining. These aircraft are either active or at least kept in annual inspection.

Three with Everts Air Fuel, N54514 Maid in Japan, N7848B Dumbo and N1837M Hot Stuff, two with Buffalo Airways C-FAVO and C-GTPO https://buffaloairways.com/fleet/, and in addition one museum example; N78774 Tinker Belle which frequently takes part in Spring through Autumn airshows and museum events.

One of Everts Air Cargo, N1822M Salmon Ella, was withdrawn from use in July 2018 after a landing accident. Everts also has several mothballed air-frames including 1651M which they hold mainly for spare parts.

== Other airworthy units ==
There are several stored examples in Bolivia, however none of them are currently active. One of them, CP-1655 owned by Eco Express Cargo Services, was being brought back to serviceable condition prior to 2012, and one more (CP-973) is set up for passenger configuration, however it is reportedly now up for sale. The future use of these Bolivian examples is uncertain as the C-46 has not seen any use since the crash of CP-1319 (Skyteam Flight Training) in 2012.

There is one additional stored example registered C-GIBX which is stored serviceable, but with the Certificate of Registration cancelled, at Gimli, Manitoba, Canada. This aircraft was tied up in receivership, however according to First Nations Transport, as of Jan 2016, the aircraft is claimed to be airworthy with two new engines and available for sale with the fire bottles and props needing updates.

One last example; N53594 China Doll was airworthy and flown by the Commemorative Air Force Museum, however it is currently grounded due to Federal Aviation Administration regulations regarding propeller time as well as having corrosion issues. She was originally scheduled to be restored back to airworthy status by 2019, however the severity of the corrosion was more extensive than first thought and the funds to bring her back to serviceable condition are not currently available.

== Surviving aircraft ==
=== Argentina ===
- 42-96729 – C-46A on static display in Loreto. It was donated to the Loreto municipality originally in 1980 to become part of an Argentina Air Force theme park. Re-located to a Public Square at Loreto (Santiago del Estero) representing the City of Loreto.

=== Bolivia ===
- 42-3638 – C-46A stored with Lineas Aereas Canedo at El Alto Airport in La Paz.
- 42-107410 – C-46A stored at El Alto Airport in La Paz.
- 44-77545 – C-46D stored with Lineas Aereas Canedo in Cochabamba.
- 44-77898 – C-46D stored with Eco Express Charter Services at El Alto Airport in La Paz.

=== Brazil ===
As of January 2016, the Brazilian Register lists PP-BTP PP-BTZ PP-ITE PP-NAO PP-NMH PP-VCE PT-AYA PT-LBP All show cancelled airworthiness certificates. PP-VCE & PT-LBP are confirmed preserved, PP-NMH exists derelict, however it is not known if any of the other 5 listed still survive.

- 41-12381 – C-46A stored with Serviços Aéreos do Vale Amazônico in Itacoatiara.
- 42-101201 – C-46A on display at the Museu Eduardo André Matarazzo, Bebedouro, São Paulo.
- 43-47084 – C-46A on display at the Museu Aeroespacial in Campo dos Afonsos, Rio de Janeiro.

=== Canada ===
According to the Transport Canada database there are three C-46's registered as of March 2026.

Read: Transport Canada registration, maker, model, serial number, operator, registered since (date), likely manufacturer's number

- C-FAVO Curtiss-Wright C46D 33242 Buffalo Airways Ltd 1995-02-14, 44-78028
- C-GTPO Curtiss-Wright C46F 22556 Buffalo Airways Ltd 2010-11-17, 44-78649
- C-GTXW Curtiss-Wright C46A-45CU 30386 Hay River Air Services Ltd. 2016-05-04, unknown

Stored unairworthy:

- 44-78733 – C-46F with Buffalo Airways in Yellowknife, North West Territories.

=== China ===
- 4?-????? – Lushan Air Pavilion, Luyang Ranghe Zhen Airbase - Dark green with medium blue undersides, massive yellow white lightning stripe, bold yellow leading edges and red Chinese lettering on the nose. - Display
- 4?-????? – Lushan Air Pavilion, Luyang Ranghe Zhen Airbase - Grey finish. - Display
- 4?-????? – Chinese Air Force - China Aviation Museum, Xiaotangshanzhen, Changping, Beijing - White with light grey undersides, code faded - One of two displayed as a pair with below.
- 4?-????? – Chinese Air Force - China Aviation Museum, Xiaotangshanzhen, Changping, Beijing - White with light grey undersides, code faded - Two of two displayed as a pair with above.
- 4?-????? – China Civil Aviation Museum, Xie Dao, Beijing - White with light grey undersides, code faded C46A - Display

=== Haiti ===
- 41-12369 – C-46A stored at Port-au-Prince.
- 42-96792 – C-46A stored at Port-au-Prince.

=== Honduras ===
- 44-78447 – C-46D fuselage stored at Tegucigalpa, Toncontin Airport.
- 44-78708 – C-46F fuselage stored at Museo del Aire de Honduras.

=== India ===
- Unknown ID – C-46 on static display outdoors at Sarsawa Air Force Station.

=== Israel ===
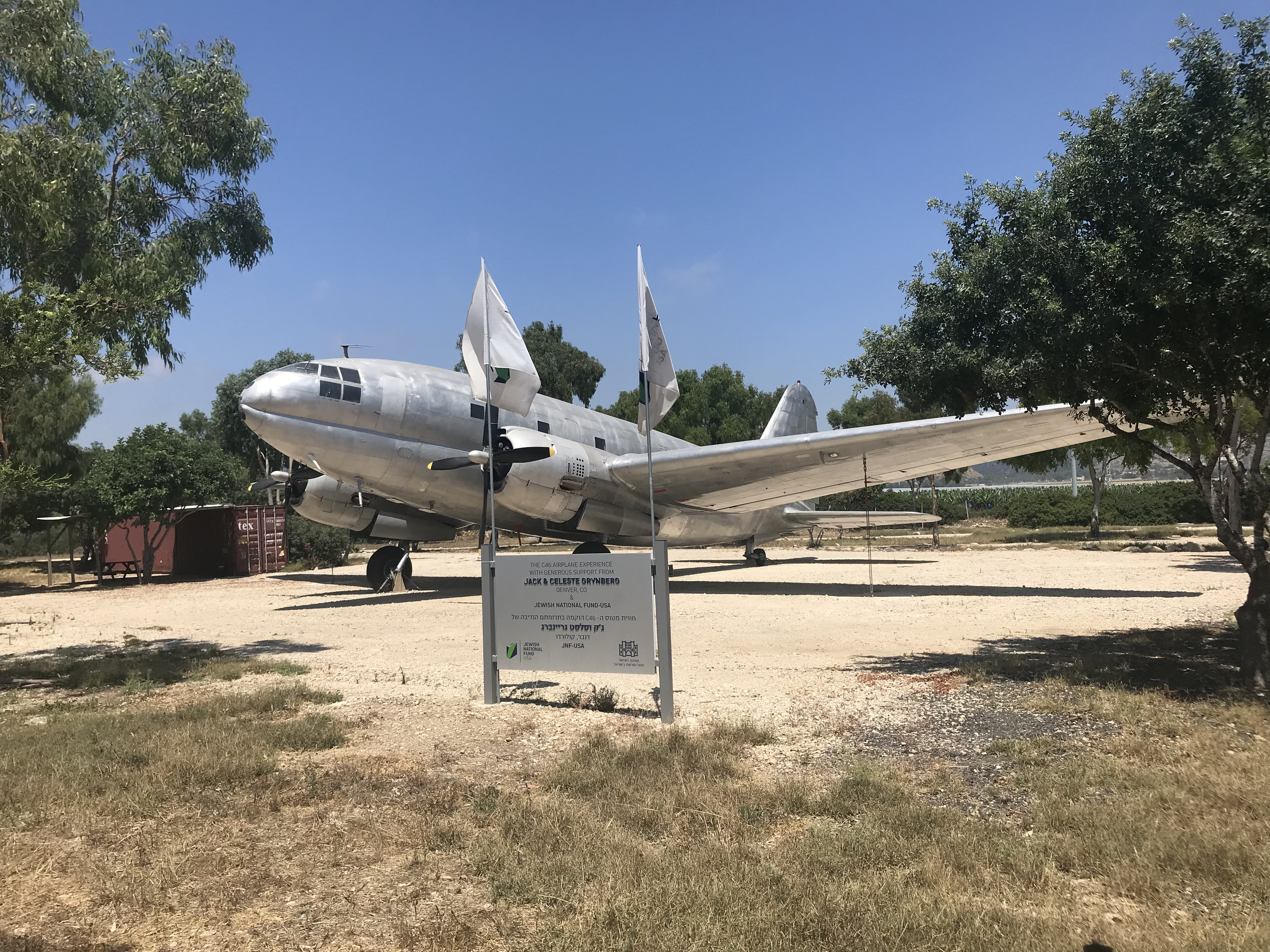
C-46F Commando at Atlit detainee camp in Israel.

- 44-78628 – C-46F on static display at Atlit detainee camp Museum.

=== Japan ===
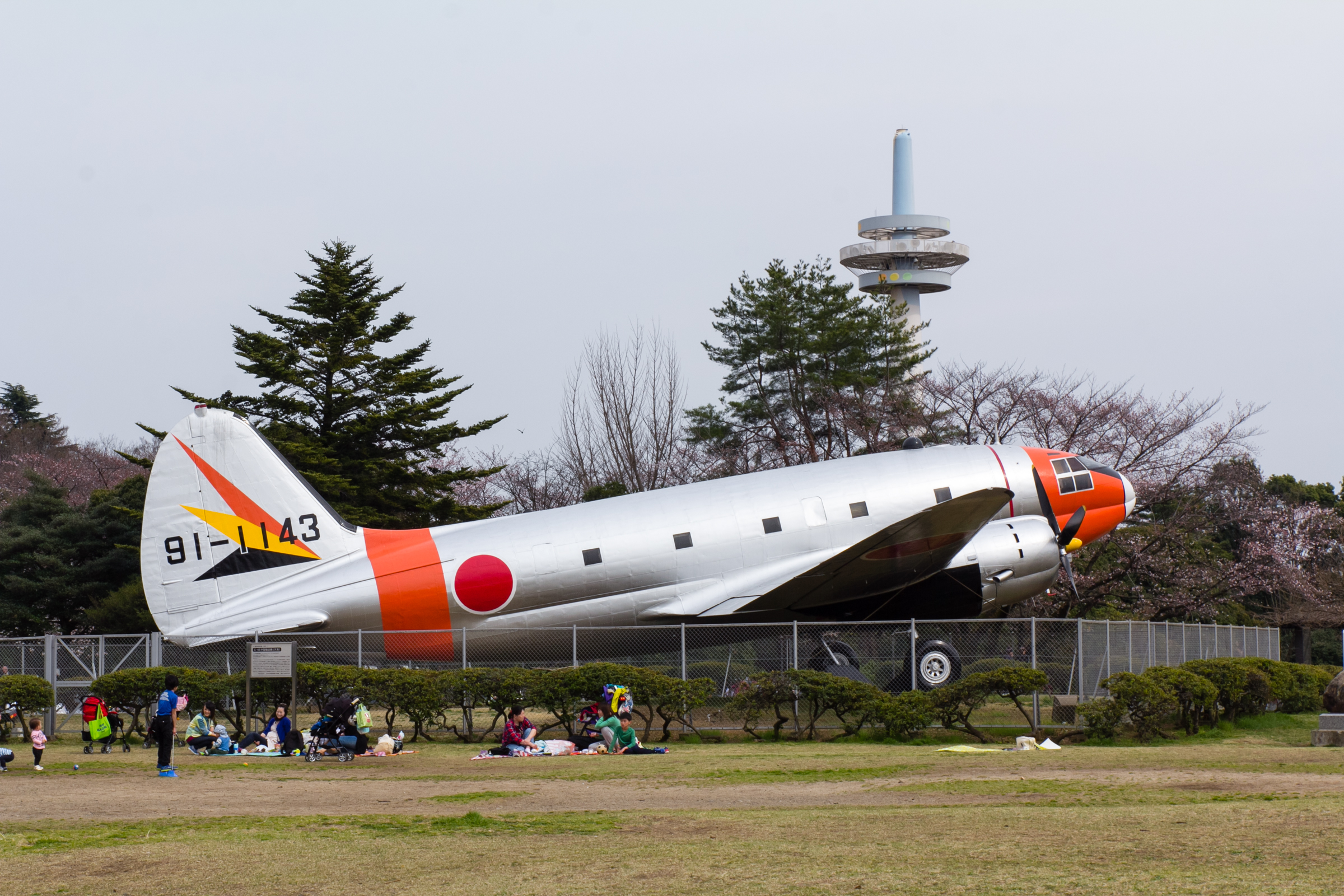
C-46A at the Tokorozawa Aviation Museum in Japan

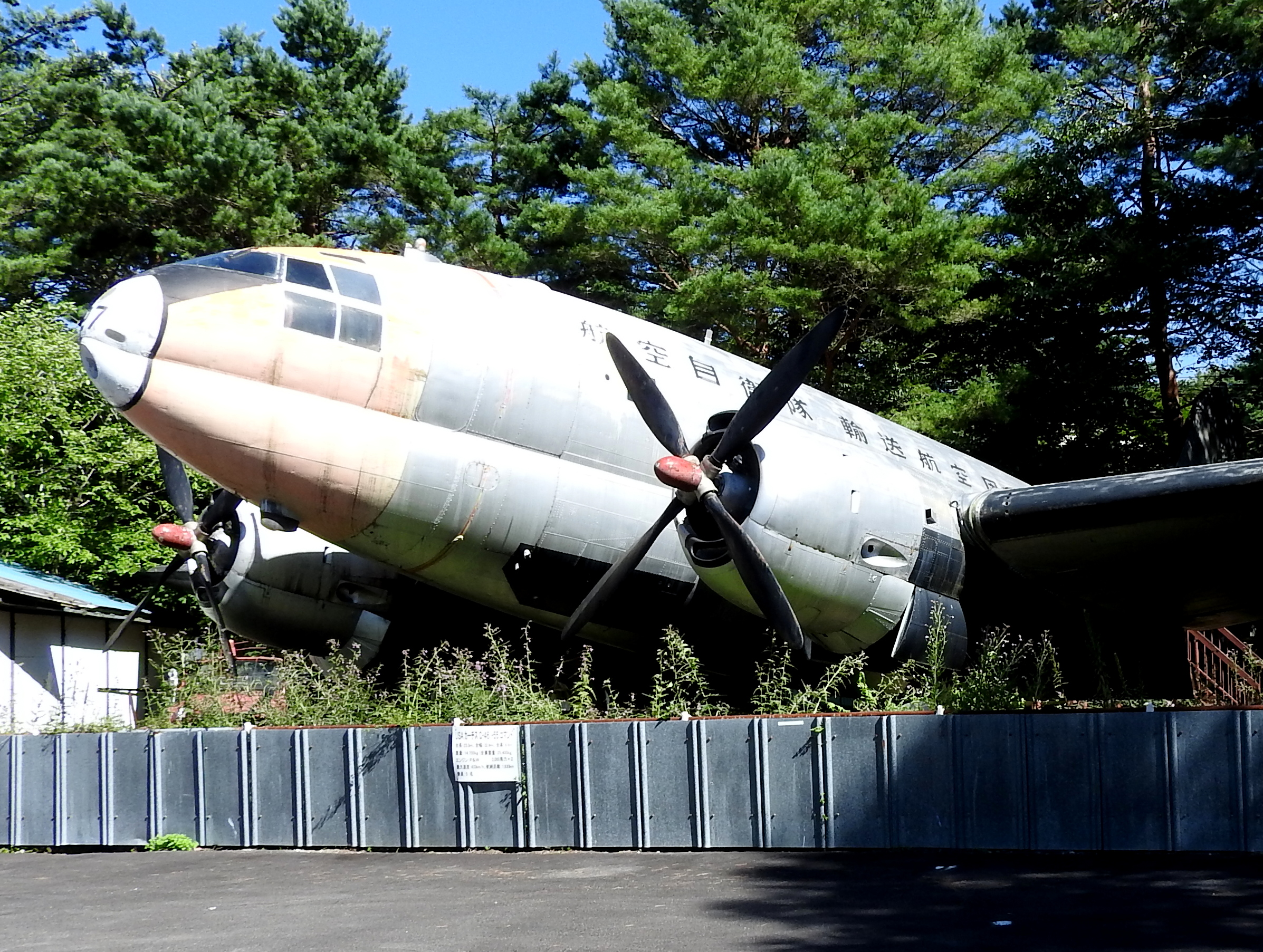
C-46D at Kawaguchiko Motor Museum in Japan

- 91-1141 – C-46D on static display at Gifu Air Field in Kakamigahara, Gifu Prefecture.
- 91-1138 – C-46D on static display at Hamamatsu Air Base in Hamamatsu, Shizuoka Prefecture.
- 91-1139 – C-46D on static display at Miho Air Base in Tottori Prefecture.
- 91-1143 – EC-46D on static display at Tokorozawa Aviation Museum in Tokorozawa in Saitama Prefecture.
- 91-1144 – C-46D nose and parts on static display at Hijiri Aviation Museum in Omi, Nagano Prefecture.
- 91-1145 – EC-46D on static display at Iruma Air Base in Saitama Prefecture.
- 61-1127 – C-46D on static display at Kawaguchiko Motor Museum in Kawaguchiko, Yamanashi Prefecture.
- 44-78480 – C-46D nose in storage with a private collection in Tokyo Prefecture.

=== Mexico ===
- 42-101231 – C-46D on display at the Explora Museum in Leon, Guanajuato.

=== Philippines ===
- 44-78748 – C-46F cockpit only on display at Cagayan de Oro. Cut up for scrap with the wings and cockpit/nose salvaged and preserved as part of restaurant theme.

=== South Korea ===
- 44-77592 – C-46D on static display at Gimhae Air Base, Pusan.
- 44-78053 – C-46D on static display at the Korea Air Force Academy in Cheongju.
- 44-78541 – C-46D on static display at the War Memorial of Korea in Seoul.

=== Taiwan ===
- 4?-???? – Republic of China Air Force Museum, Gangshan, Kaohsiung. Tail has the numbers stenciled C46-045. - Display

=== Thailand ===
- 44-78738 – C-46F stored at Chonburi, Thailand. Formerly located at Lad Phrao, Bangkok and set up as 'Apichart' coffee shop in 1985; moved to Chonburi 2001.
- 4?-????? – C-46 stored at the Police Training Camp on Highway 22, Udon Thani, Thailand.

=== United States ===
Airworthy

C-46A Commando

- 43-47201 Dumbo – operated by Everts Air Cargo in Fairbanks, Alaska

C-46D Commando

- 44-77889 Maid in Japan – operated by Everts Air Cargo in Fairbanks, Alaska.

C-46F Commando

- 44-78774 Tinker Belle – based at the Military Aviation Museum in Virginia Beach, Virginia.

On Display

C-46A Commando

- 43-47350 – Air Mobility Command Museum in Dover, Delaware.

C-46D Commando

- 42-101198 – Museum of Aviation adjacent to Robins Air Force Base in Warner Robins, Georgia.
- 44-77424 – Air Commando Park at Hurlburt Field near Mary Esther, Florida.
- 44-77575 Honey Gal – Castle Air Museum in Atwater, California.
- 44-77635 Syracuse Shackrat – Pima Air & Space Museum in Tucson, Arizona.
- 44-78018 – National Museum of the United States Air Force at Wright-Patterson Air Force Base in Dayton, Ohio.
- 44-78019 – Joe Davies Heritage Airpark in Palmdale, California.

C-46F Commando

- 44-78573 – 82nd Airborne Division War Memorial Museum at Fort Bragg near Fayetteville, North Carolina.
- 44-78663 China Doll – based at the Southern California Wing of the Commemorative Air Force in Camarillo, California.
- 44-78772 – Glenn H. Curtiss Museum in Hammondsport, New York. It is on loan from the National Air and Space Museum.

Under restoration or in storage

C-46D Commando

- 44-77559 – in storage at the Planes of Fame Museum in Chino, California.

C-46F Commando

- 43-47218 – in storage at the Yanks Air Museum in Chino, California.
- 44-78495 – in storage by Everts Air Cargo in Fairbanks, Alaska.
- 44-78565 Hot Stuff – in storage by Everts Air Cargo in Fairbanks, Alaska.
- 44-78698 Salmon Ella – in storage by Everts Air Cargo in Fairbanks, Alaska.
