= MAPS Air Museum =

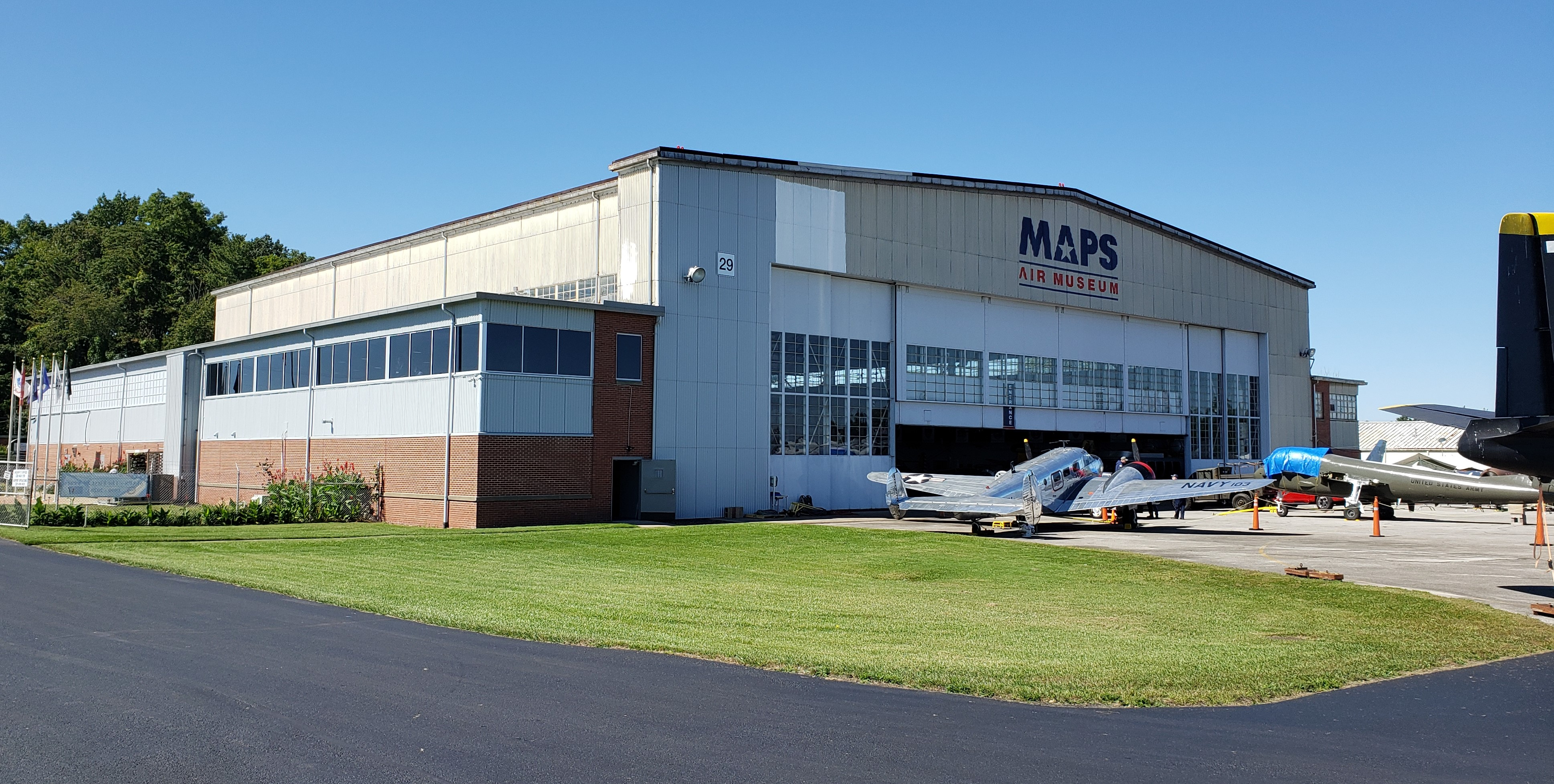

- Location within Ohio
- Established: 1990
- Location: North Canton, Ohio
- Coordinates: 40°55′1″N 81°27′16″W
- Type: Aviation museum
- Executive director: Kim Kovesci
- Curator: Jim Cameron
- Website: www.mapsairmuseum.org

The MAPS Air Museum is an aviation museum in North Canton, Ohio, United States. Run by the Military Aviation Preservation Society, it is located off SR241 on the west side of the Akron-Canton Regional Airport.

The museum holds more than 50 aircraft, most on loan from the U.S. Air Force or Navy for restoration. It also has two aircraft from the Goodyear Rubber Company.

== History ==
The museum was founded in 1990 with warbird collector David Tallichet and his Military Aircraft Restoration Corporation. In 1995, the museum opened to the public, housed in the National Guard Maintenance Building on the west side of the airport. In 2000, the first air show was held at the museum. In 2001, the museum moved to the nearby former Chautauqua Airlines hangar.

The Ohio Military Museum moved to the museum from Massillon in 2015.

In October 2018, thieves stole helmets, goggles, oxygen masks, helicopter controls, and other items from the museum. Two 17-year-olds were arrested on theft charges two weeks later.

In 2020, the museum reopened the hangar's second floor after renovations; its rental spaces include a conference room, a banquet hall, and a full-sized commercial kitchen.

In 2025, the museum received a donation of four Goodyear Ducks that had been discovered in a barn in Kalamazoo, Michigan. That November, a fire destroyed a recreation of a Mobile Army Surgical Hospital tent.

In 2026, Kim Kovesci retired as executive director after 16 years and was succeeded by Keith W. Bucklew.

== Facilities ==
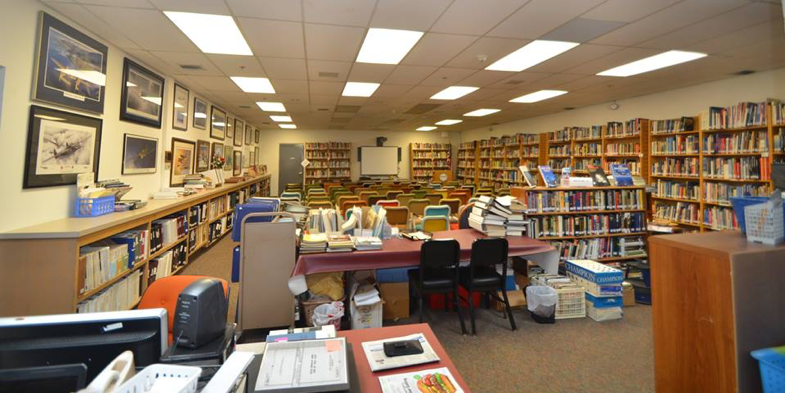
Louise Timken Aviation Library

The aircraft are displayed in a former U.S. Air National Guard hangar and on an adjacent tarmac.

The museum's library maintains and preserves institutional records and collects, preserves, and makes available images, literature, manuscripts, memoirs, diaries, books, and oral histories relating to military history. The library collection is open to the public with admission to the museum. Members may check books out.

== Exhibits ==
A tent called the "Medic's Corner" outside the hangar displays a collection of Vietnam War-era medical equipment.

The museum's Gallery of Heroes room holds detailed models and period items from wars. Various displays highlight Pearl Harbor (artifacts include a piece of the battleship Arizona), the Tuskegee Airmen, and Rosie the Riveter, and include items on loan from members of the museum and community who fought in wars.

== Collection ==
- Aero L-29 Delfín
- Aero S-106
- Beechcraft SNB-5
- Bell AH-1G Cobra
- Bell OH-58A Kiowa
- Cessna T-37A Tweet
- Cessna T-37B Tweet
- CGS Hawk Ultra
- Convair F-102A Delta Dagger
- Douglas A-4A Skyhawk
- Douglas A-26C Invader
- Douglas C-47B Skytrain
- Fairchild PT-19
- Funk Model B
- General Dynamics F-16 Fighting Falcon
- Goodyear GA-22A Drake
- Goodyear FG-1D Corsair – cockpit only
- Goodyear GZ-22 – control car only
- Grumman F9F-8P Cougar
- Grumman F11F Tiger
- Grumman F-14B Tomcat
- Grumman OV-1A Mohawk
- Grumman S-2F Tracker
- Lockheed C-130 Hercules
- Lockheed T-33
- LTV A-7E Corsair II
- Martin B-26 Marauder
- Martin Glider
- McDonnell Douglas F-4S Phantom II
- McDonnell F-101F Voodoo
- Mikoyan-Gurevich MiG-15bis
- North American F-86A Sabre
- North American F-86L Sabre
- North American F-100D Super Sabre
- North American T-28 Trojan
- Piper PA-23-150
- Pitts S1
- PZL-Mielec Lim-6
- Republic F-84F Thunderstreak
- Republic F-105B Thunderchief
- Ryan L-17B Navion
- Sikorsky H-19 Chickasaw
- Sopwith Triplane – reproduction
- Vultee BT-13 Valiant

== Programs ==
The museum conducts a veterans oral history program, sending many of the interviews to the Veterans History Project.

== See also ==
- MAPS Aero Expo
- List of museums in Ohio
- List of aviation museums
