= MAPS Aero Expo =

- Genre: Air show
- Venue: Akron Fulton International Airport
- Location: Akron, Ohio
- Country: U.S.A.

The MAPS Aero Expo is an aircraft exposition show featuring antique aircraft and modern aircraft on display for the public in Akron, Ohio, at the Akron Fulton International Airport. The Expo features aircraft for visitors to see up close as well as aerial demonstrations in both fighter jets and antique planes.
