= List of surviving Lockheed P-38 Lightnings =

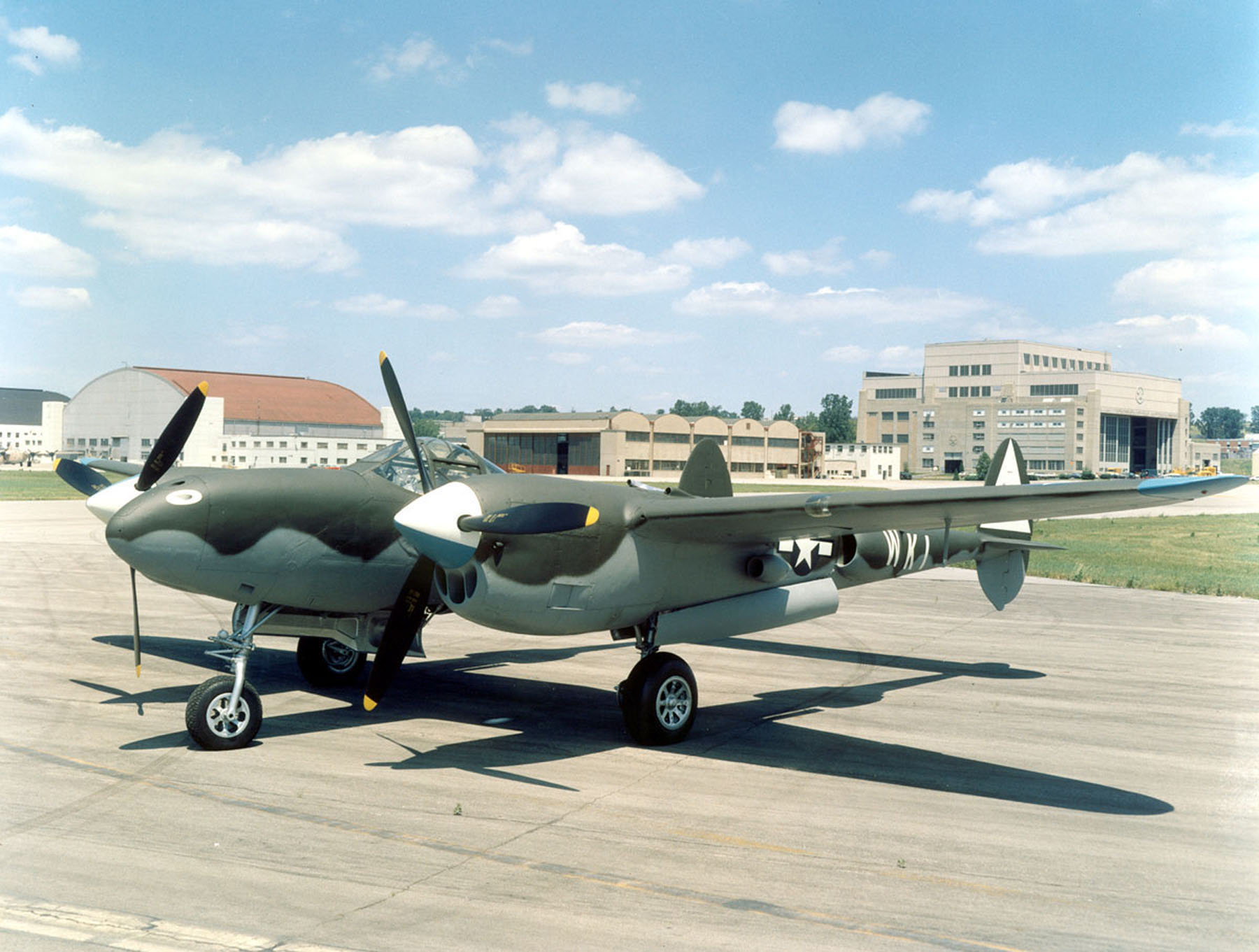
P-38L 44-53232 at the National Museum of the United States Air Force

The Lockheed P-38 Lightning is an American two-engine fighter used by the United States Army Air Forces and other Allied air forces during World War II. Of the 10,037 planes built, 26 survive today, 22 of which are located in the United States, and 10 of which are airworthy.

== Background ==
In late 1945 when the last P-38 came off the production line, 9,923 aircraft had been delivered to the USAAF. The P-38 was quickly declared obsolete in 1946 and the last USAF flight was in 1948.

This was an extremely complicated aircraft to maintain. The P-38 Lightning has been consistently on the civil registry since 1946 since the first aircraft were released from the military. It does remain a demanding aircraft with numerous crash incidents; several of the surviving planes have been rebuilt many times.

A considerable number of late model Lightnings which had been converted by Lockheed to Photo Reconnaissance (F-5) models found a niche with photo mapping companies and until the middle 1960s these aircraft earned their keep through photo mapping assignments around the globe. Additionally, the latest military use of the P-38 was with several South American air forces, the largest of these being Fuerza Aérea Hondureña which operated the Lockheed Lightning until the early 1960s. There were also a small number of P-38s that were purchased after the war for civilian air racing. It is from these sources that until the early 1980s all the remaining stocks of the P-38 Lightning could be drawn from.

One historic note was that in 1948, representatives of the then-new country of South Korea attempted to purchase the brand new P-38L Lightnings stored in the Philippines (approximately 100 aircraft). Instead, the USAF persuaded them to accept AT-6s modified to ground attack role as well as worn out P-51D Mustangs; the brand new P-38s were destroyed.

As with all remaining warbirds, collectors began scouring the world for forgotten aircraft. From the jungle of New Guinea, the wilderness of Alaska and under the ice of Greenland are but some of the places previously unrestorable wrecked airframes are being recovered and being restored for both static display and airworthy exhibition.

== Individual histories ==
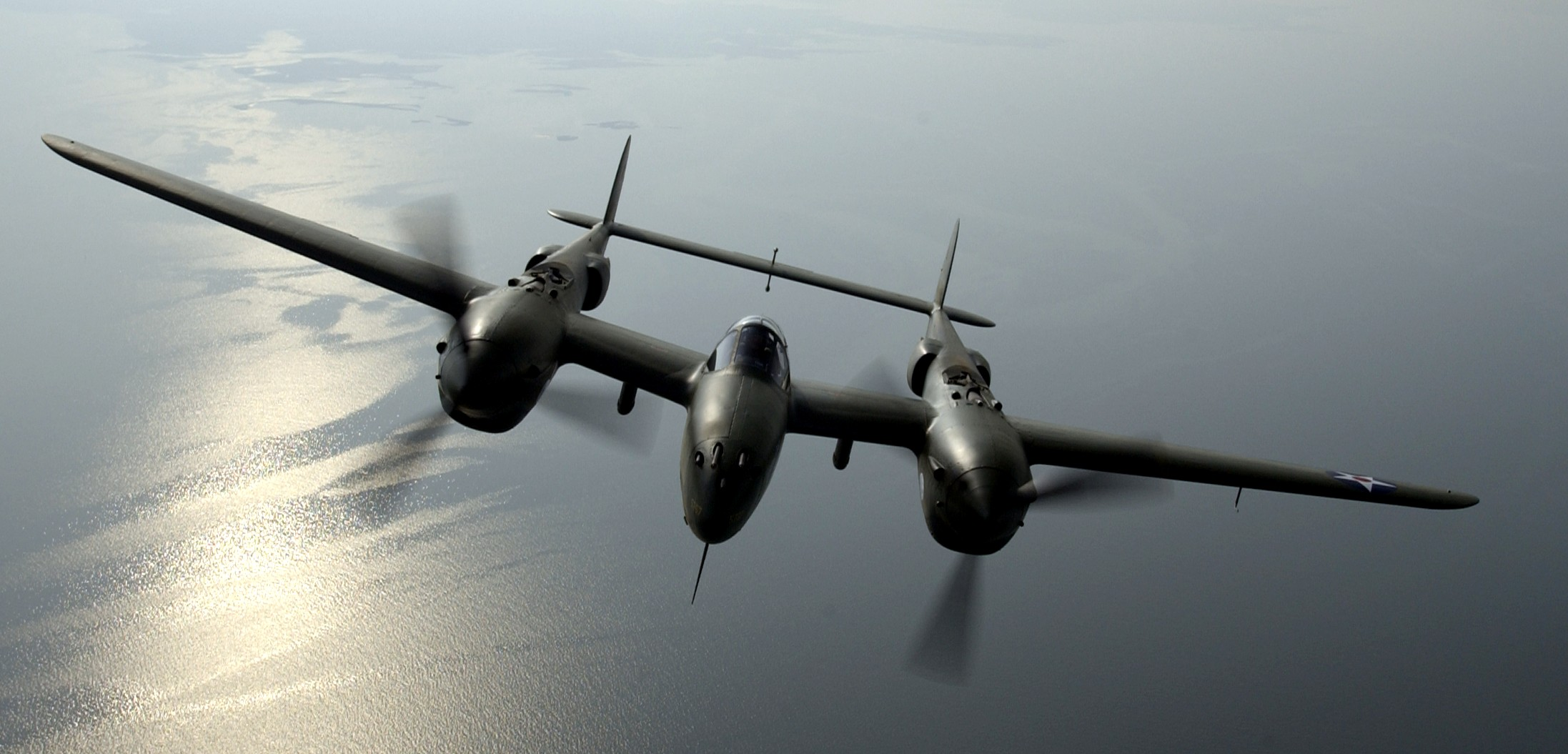
P-38 Glacier Girl

- Glacier Girl (41-7630), this P-38F-1 flown by 1st Lt. Harry L. Smith Jr., 94th Fighter Squadron, was one of six P-38 fighters of the 1st Fighter Group escorting two B-17 bombers on a ferry flight to the United Kingdom as part of Operation Bolero on 15 July 1942. While en route over Greenland, bad weather caused the eight aircraft to turn back, the entire flight attempting to land together before they ran out of fuel. Although one P-38 overturned, the flight successfully belly-landed. The crews were rescued within a few days, but the airplanes were abandoned and, over the years, covered by ice. A few attempts to salvage the airplanes were made but were unsuccessful. In 1981 Pat Epps of Epps Aviation in Atlanta, GA, and Richard Taylor, an Atlanta architect, bought the salvage rights from Roy Degan, who had gotten them from the Danish Government to search for the planes. They formed the Greenland Expedition Society. Don Brooks, a south Georgia businessman, joined the team in 1986 and bought a DC3 to help with the recovery. Joined to this were the efforts of many adventurers, aviation enthusiasts, and investors. It took seven trips and almost two million dollars to recover the plane. In 1992, 50 years after the planes landed, a P-38 recovery mission was undertaken. Using photos taken by the original crews while they were awaiting rescue as well as modern seismographic equipment, the salvage workers located the buried squadron and selected the least damaged of the planes. They reached it by boring a hole using hot water through the layer of ice 268 feet thick. Roy Shoffner, a businessman from Middlesboro, Kentucky was the major investor of the 1992 expedition. He also gets credit for 100% of the restoration of Glacier Girl. The airplane was transported to Middlesboro, where a ten-year restoration began using many parts from late model aircraft. Nicknamed Glacier Girl, the restored P-38F Lightning made its first post-restoration flight on 26 October 2002.
- Maid of Harlech (41-7677) P-38F-1LO ex-49th Squadron, 14th Fighter Group, 8th Air Force, in the summer of 2007 this aircraft was discovered on a beach in Wales, having been buried in the sand for 65 years. A wingtip had come off the aircraft during its belly landing, but the pilot—Second Lt. Robert F. 'Fred' Elliot—escaped unhurt. Elliot was on a gunnery practice mission when a fuel supply error forced him to make an emergency landing. American airmen salvaged the nose guns but were unable to fly the fighter off the beach, abandoning it in place where it became covered by naturally shifting sand. Elliot was shot down less than three months later while flying combat missions over Tunisia. His body and aircraft were never found.

== Surviving aircraft ==
=== Australia ===
Under restoration

P-38F

- 42-12647 Dottie from Brooklyn – Under restoration to display by the Historical Aircraft Restoration Society for the Papua New Guinea National Museum and Art Gallery in Port Moresby, Papua New Guinea.

P-38G

- 42-12847 Dumbo! – Under restoration to display by the Historical Aircraft Restoration Society for the Pima Air & Space Museum in Tucson, Arizona.

P-38

- Unknown – Under restoration to airworthiness by the Historical Aircraft Restoration Society in Albion Park, New South Wales.

=== Austria ===
Airworthy

P-38L

- 44-53254 – The Flying Bulls in Salzburg. Formerly called "White Lightnin'" and owned until 2008 by Marvin L. "Lefty" Gardner. Gardner, along with Lloyd Nolan, cofounded what is now the Commemorative Air Force. Registered to Aircraft Guaranty Title Corp. Trustee in Onalaska, Texas.

=== Serbia ===
Under restoration

P-38L

- 44-25786 – Museum of Aviation in Belgrade. In storage, awaiting restoration.

=== United Kingdom ===
Under restoration

P-38H

- 42-66841 Scarlet Scourge – Sold and transported to the United Kingdom during the late 2014 where it might be restored to airworthy condition.

=== United States ===
Airworthy

P-38F

- 41-7630 Glacier Girl – based at Lewis Air Legends in San Antonio, Texas.
- 42-12652 White 33 – based at the National Museum of World War II Aviation in Colorado Springs, Colorado.

P-38J

- 42-103988 Jandina III – based at Flying Heritage Collection in Everett, Washington.
- 44-23314 23 Skidoo – based at Planes of Fame in Chino, California.

P-38L

- 44-26981 Honey Bunny – based at Allied Fighters in Sun Valley, Idaho.
- 44-27053 Relampago – based at War Eagles Air Museum in Santa Teresa, New Mexico.
- 44-27083 Tangerine – based at Erickson Aircraft Collection in Madras, Oregon.
- 44-27231 Scat III (Formerly Ruff Stuff) – based at Fagen Fighters WWII Museum in Granite Falls, Minnesota.
- 44-53095 Thoughts of Midnite – privately owned in Houston, Texas.
- 44-53186 "Pudgy V" – based at Collings Foundation in Stow, Massachusetts.

F-5A

- 44-27183 based at Yanks Air Museum in Chino, California.

On display

P-38G

- 42-13400 (unnamed) – Joint Base Elmendorf-Richardson (formerly Elmendorf AFB) in Anchorage, Alaska; crash landed on Attu Island in 1945, recovered in 1999.

P-38J

- 42-67638 (unnamed) – Hill Aerospace Museum at Hill AFB, Utah.
- 42-67762 (unnamed) – Steven F. Udvar-Hazy Center of the National Air and Space Museum in Chantilly, Virginia.
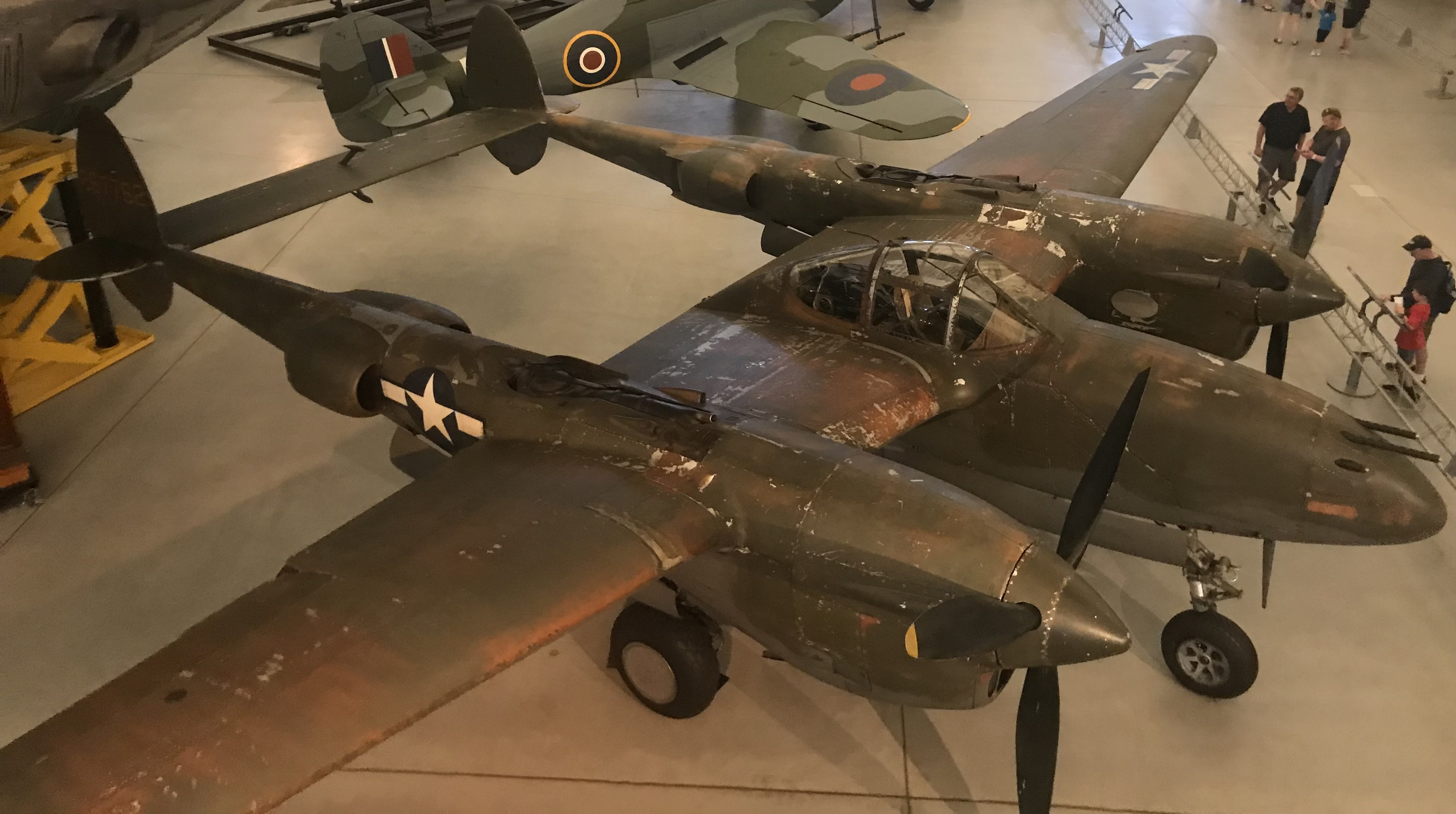
  P-38J-10-LO at the Steven F. Udvar-Hazy Center.

P-38L

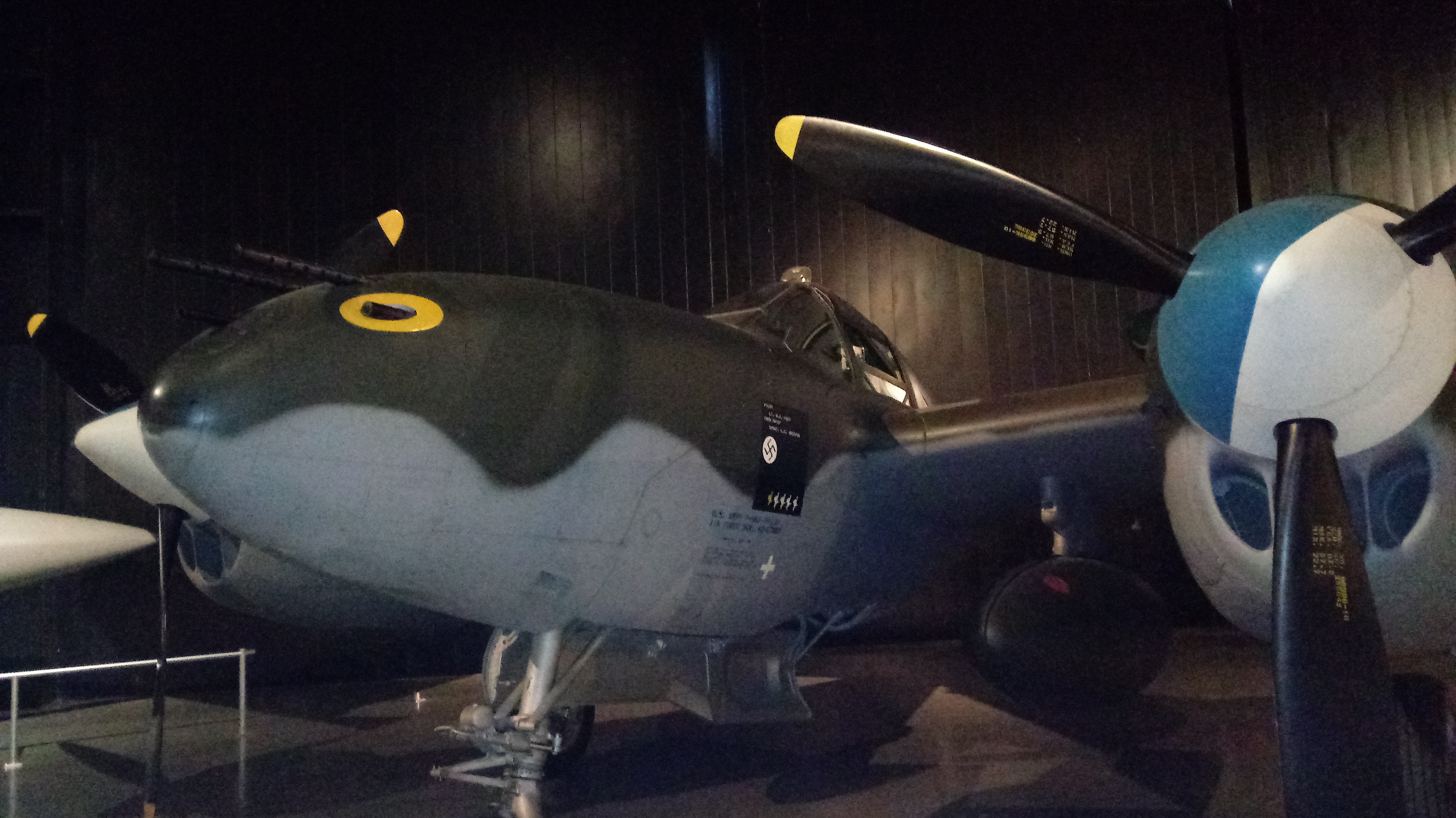
P-38L at the National Museum of the United States Air Force

- 44-53015 Pudgy V – McGuire AFB, New Jersey.
- 44-53087 Marge – EAA AirVenture Museum in Oshkosh, Wisconsin.
- 44-53097 Lizzie V / Wyandotte Mich. – Museum of Flight in Seattle, Washington.
- 44-53232 (unnamed) – National Museum of the United States Air Force at Wright-Patterson AFB in Dayton, Ohio.
- 44-53236 Marge – Richard I. Bong Veterans Historical Center in Superior, Wisconsin.

Under restoration or in storage

P-38H

- 42-66534 – to airworthiness by private owner in Wilmington, Delaware.

P-38J

- 42-104088 – in storage at the Flying Heritage Collection in Everett, Washington.

P-38L

- 44-26761 – in storage at Fantasy of Flight in Polk City, Florida.
