= List of surviving Saab 35 Drakens =

The Saab 35 Draken is a Swedish fighter aircraft that was manufactured by Saab between 1955 and 1974. As well as being operated by the Swedish Air Force the aircraft was also exported to Austria, Denmark and Finland.

== Surviving aircraft ==
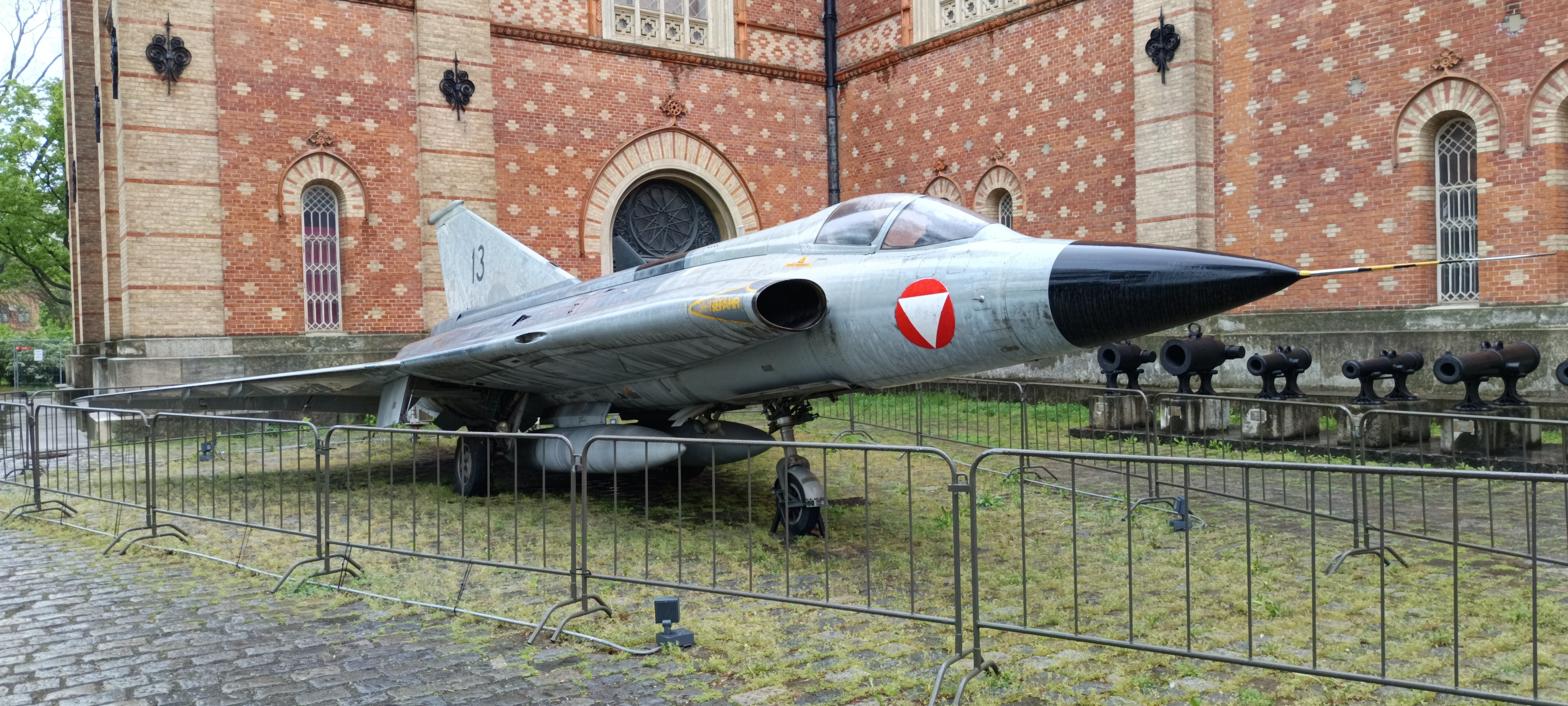
Draken at the Heeresgeschichtliches Museum, Vienna

Austria

- On display
  - J 35OE 07 of the Austrian Air Force at Graz Museum, Graz.
  - J 35OE 08 of the Austrian Air Force at Zeltweg Museum.
  - J 35OE 09 of the Austrian Air Force at Zeltweg Museum.
  - J 35OE 351413 of the Austrian Air Force at the Heeresgeschichtliches Museum in Vienna.
  - J 35OE 14 of the Austrian Air Force at Zeltweg Museum.
  - J 35OE 351417 of the Austrian Air Force placed at roundabout by Tulln.
  - J 35OE 18 of the Austrian Air Force at Salzburg Barracks.
  - J 35OE 21 of the Austrian Air Force at Zeltweg Museum.
  - J 35OE 24 of the Austrian Air Force at Flugplatz Voslau.
  - J 35D 35339 formerly of the Swedish Air Force painted as 25 of the Austrian Air Force gate guard at Zeltweg.
  - J 35J 35601 formerly of the Swedish Air Force painted as 16 of the Austrian Air Force displayed outside a shopping centre in Voitsberg.
  - SK 35C 35804 of the Swedish Air Force at Graz Museum, Graz.
- Stored or under restoration
  - J 35OE 04 of the Austrian Air Force at Zeltweg.
  - J 35OE 06 of the Austrian Air Force privately owned in Graz.
  - J 35OE 12 of the Austrian Air Force at Zeltweg Museum.
- Instructional airframe
  - J 35F 35514 formerly of the Swedish Air Force at Truppenübungsplatz Allentsteig.
  - J 35J 35596 formerly of the Swedish Air Force at Truppenübungsplatz Allentsteig.
  - J 35OE 11 Austrian Air Force at Linz-Horsching.

Belgium

- On display
  - J 35A 35067 former Swedish Air Force at the Brussels Air Museum, Brussels.

Czech Republic

- On display
  - J 35J 35518 former Swedish Air Force at the Prague Aviation Museum, Kbely

Denmark

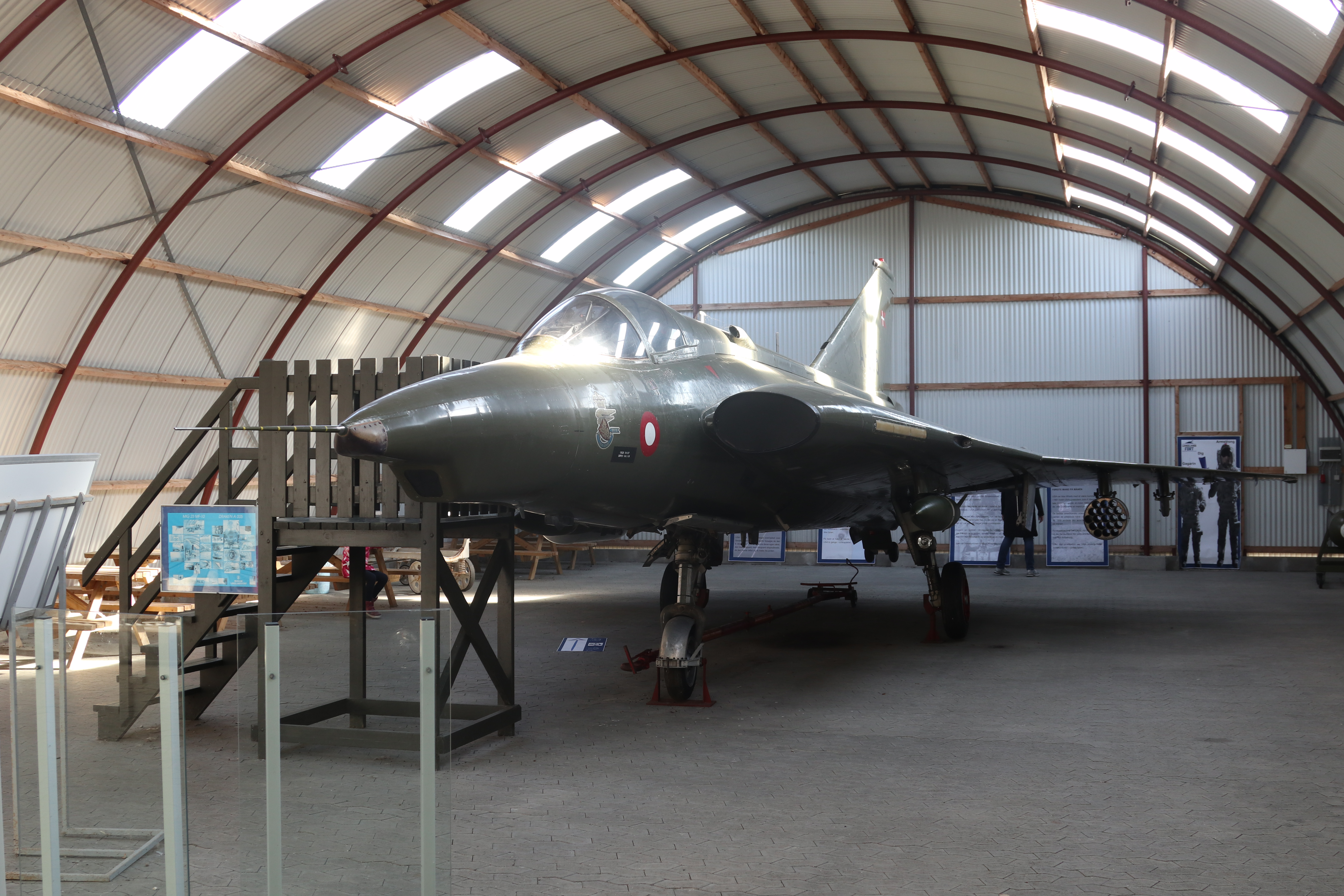
A-005 on display at Cold War Museum Langelandsfort 2020.

- On display
  - F-35 A-005 is on display at Cold War Museum Langelandsfort
  - F-35 A-008 is "gateguard" on Randers Airport. ICAO: EKRD.
  - F-35 A-009 of the RDAF at Danmarks Flymuseum, Stauning.
  - F-35 A-011 of the RDAF in Atherton.
  - F-35 A-010 of the RDAF at Aalborg Defence and Garrison Museum at Aalborg. In deteriorating condition as it is stored outside of any hangar and not much funding is available to refurbish it.
  - F-35 A-012 is on display at Egeskov Castle.
  - RF-35 AR-102 of the RDAF as gatekeeper at Tønder "Air Force Base"
  - RF 35 AR-104 at the Terma factory, Grenå
  - RF-35 (RDAF AR-105) has been mounted on hydraulic jacks as a flight simulator. It is operated by Viadukten recreational club in the Danish town of Roskilde, close to the railroad.
  - RF-35 AR-112 of the RDAF used as a gateguard for Karup Airport.
  - RF-35 AR-113 former Royal Danish Air Force aircraft with the Draken Team Karup in taxying condition at Karup.
  - RF-35 AR-115 Former Royal Danish Air force Sqn 729 on display at Cold War Museum Stevnsfortet
  - RF-35 AR-118 of the RDAF is a gateguard outside Danmarks Flymuseum, Stauning.
  - TF-35D OY-SKA former Royal Danish Air Force AT-158, with the Draken Team Karup in taxying condition at Karup.

Estonia

- On display
  - J 35J 35541 of the Swedish Air Force at the Estonian Aviation Museum at Tartu County.

Finland

- On display
  - J35S DK-213 at Karelia Aviation Museum, Lappeenranta.
  - J35FS DK-259 at Karhulan ilmailukerho Aviation Museum outside Kotka.
  - J35FS DK-249 at Aviation Museum of Central Finland, Tikkakoski.
  - J35BS DK-206 at Finnish Aviation Museum, Vantaa.
  - J35FS DK-223 at Aviation Museum of Central Finland, Tikkakoski.
  - J35FS DK-241 at Aviation Museum of Central Finland, Tikkakoski.
  - J35CS DK-262 at Finnish Aviation Museum, outside (summer) Vantaa.
  - J35CS DK-270 at Aviation Museum of Central Finland, Tikkakoski.
  - J35S DK-207 at Päijänne Tavastia Aviation Museum, Asikkala.

Couple of Drakens standing as memorials Satakunta Air Command Tampere, ex Aircraft and Weapon Systems Training Wing's base at Halli Airport, Lapland Air Command Rovaniemi, Kittilä Airport, DK-219 at Pudasjärvi Airfield and DK-208 at the roundabout] leading to Turku Airport.

France

- On display
  - J 35A 35069 of the Swedish Air Force Uppland Wing (F 16) at the Musée de l'Air at Paris.
  - J 35Ö 351402 of the Austrian Air Force, at Musée des ailes anciennes, Toulouse

Germany

- On display
  - J 35A 35086 originally of the Swedish Air Force at the Deutsches Museum Flugwerft Schleissheim
  - J 35Ö 351404 is a former Austrian Air Force aircraft at Technik Museum Speyer, Speyer.
  - S 35E 35931 at Flugausstellung Hermeskeil

Norway

- In storage
  - RF-35 AR-114 of the RDAF at Sola Aviation Museum outside Stavanger.
  - RF-35 AR-120 of the RDAF at Norwegian Aviation Museum in Bodø.

Poland

- On display
  - J 35J 35520 of the Swedish Air Force at the Polish Aviation Museum at Kraków

Sweden

- Airworthy
  - J 35J 35556 SE-DXR of the Swedish Air Force Historic Flight
  - Sk 35C 35810 SE-DXP of the Swedish Air Force Historic Flight
- On display
  - J 35A 35-1 the second prototype at Svedinos Bil- & Flymuseum, Ugglarp, Schweden
  - J 35D 35375 at the Swedish Air Force Museum ("Flygvapenmuseum"), Malmslätt near Linköping
  - J 35 F 35404 on pole at Kalmar Öland Airport (former F12).
  - J 35J 35409 on a pole at the Scania Wing (F 10)
  - J 35F-1 35415 at the Aeroseum, Gothenburg
  - J 35F 35477 on a pole on the E4 road near Östergötland County. Linköping
  - J 35F 35482 remains of front end at the Aeroseum, Gothenburg
  - J 35F 35496 at Västerås flygmuseum
  - J 35F-2 35528 at the Aeroseum, Gothenburg
  - J 35F-2 35555 at Västerås flygmuseum
  - J 35F 35583 on a pole at Stockholm-Västerås Airport
  - J 35J 35586 at the Aeroseum, Gothenburg
  - J 35J 35598 at the Aeroseum, Gothenburg
  - J 35J 35604 at RFN Museum near Vidsel
  - J 35J 35606 nose section in Ängelholms Flygmuseum
  - J 35J 35612 at Stenbäcks Flygmuseum, Skurup
  - J 35J 35616 in the Volvo Museum, Gothenburg
  - J 35J 35630 at the Ängelholms Flygmuseum on the former the Scania Wing (F 10)
  - S 35E 35916 at the F11 Museum near the Stockholm Skavsta airport
  - J 35OE 351419 at the Robotmuseum, Arboga

United Kingdom

- On display
  - J 35A 35075 formerly of the Swedish Air Force at the Dumfries and Galloway Aviation Museum, former RAF Dumfries, Scotland.
  - J 35F 35515 formerly of the Swedish Air Force at IrvinGQ (was Airborne Systems), Llangeinor, Wales.
  - S-35XD 351107 AR-107 flew in RAF Scampton 25-02-94 and was moved by road on 29-06-94 to Newark Air Museum

United States of America

- Airworthy
  - J35F N543J former Swedish Air Force Fv35543 at McClellan Air Park, California.
- Stored or under restoration
  - J35D N35350 former Swedish Air Force Fv35350 at McClellan Air Park, California. At the time of writing the aircraft is currently for sale.
  - F-35 N20XD former Royal Danish Air Force A-020, stored at Chino Airport, California.(seen Sep 2015)
  - RF-35 N106XD former Royal Danish Air Force AR-106, Awaiting Restoration at Estrella Warbirds Museum, Paso Robles, California (Aug 2019). Formerly stored at Chino Airport, California.
  - RF-35 N110FR former Royal Danish Air Force AR-110, stored in the middle of the main airliner storage area at Mojave, California.(seen Nov 2015* appears in music video released 2017)
  - RF-35 N111XD former Royal Danish Air Force AR-111, stored at Williamsburg, Virginia.
  - RF-35 N116XD former Royal Danish Air Force AR-116 at Pima Air and Space Museum, Tucson, Arizona (Restoration completed July 23, 2024). Formerly stored at Chino Airport, California.
  - RF-35 N217FR former Royal Danish Air Force AR-117, stored in the middle of the main airliner storage area at Mojave, California.(seen Nov 2015* appears in music video released 2017).
  - RF-35 N119XD former Royal Danish Air Force AR-119, stored wing and tail-less outside the National Test Pilot School, Mojave, California.(seen Nov 2015)
  - TF-35 N166TP former Royal Danish Air Force AT-151 on display at the airfield at Mojave, California. (seen Nov 2015)
  - TF-35 N155XD former Royal Danish Air Force AT-155, brought to the Palm Springs Air Museum, Palm Springs, California. Formerly stored Chino Airport, California.
  - TF-35 N167TP former Royal Danish Air Force AT-153 on display at Vernon P. Saxon Aerospace Museum, Boron, California
  - TF-35 N168TP former Royal Danish Air Force AT-154 on display at the Castle Air Museum, Atwater, California
  - TF-35 N169TP former Royal Danish Air Force AT-157 stored in the middle of the main airliner storage area at Mojave, California.(seen Nov 2015)
