= List of surviving Blackburn Buccaneers =

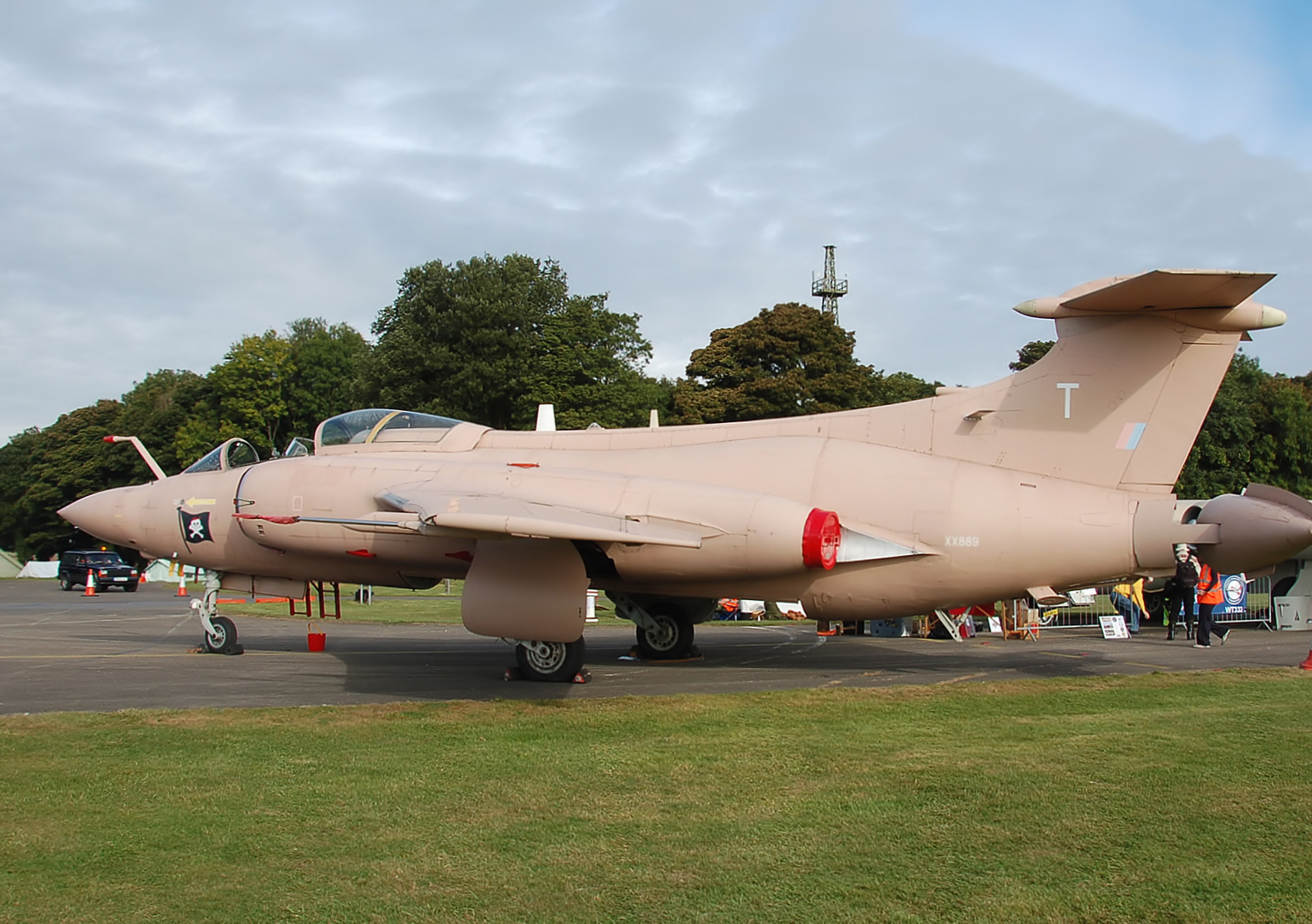
Blackburn Buccaneer S2B XX889 at Kemble Aerodrome in 2009, in the colours of Operation Granby.

The Blackburn Buccaneer is a British low-level attack aircraft that served with the Royal Navy (RN) and Royal Air Force (RAF) between 1962 and 1994, and the South African Air Force (SAAF) until 1991. Three former Royal Aircraft Establishment (RAE) aircraft remain airworthy in South Africa, and one is being restored to flight status in the United Kingdom.

== Surviving aircraft ==
=== Germany ===
On display

- Buccaneer S2C, registration XV337, is on static display at the RAF Laarbruch Museum.
- Buccaneer S2B, XX893, cockpit section only: Museum für Luftfahrt und Technik, Werningerode, Germany.

=== Ireland ===
On display

- Buccaneer S2B, XX897, is on static display at the Irish National Air Museum, Atlantic Air Venture Park Shannon Airport, Co. Clare in European Airlines colours. Fitted with a Panavia Tornado F2 nosecone and was used to trial the Tornado ADV's Foxhunter radar.

=== South Africa ===
Airworthy

- Buccaneer S2B, registration ZU-AVI, the former Royal Aircraft Establishment (RAE) registration XW988, based at Thunder City, Cape Town International Airport.

Stored

- Buccaneer S2B, ZU-BCR, the former Royal Aircraft Establishment XW987, based at Thunder City, Cape Town International Airport.
- Buccaneer S2B, ZU-NIP, the former Royal Aircraft Establishment XW986, based at Thunder City, Cape Town International Airport.

Both of these were flyable but were put for sale, although ZU-NIP is still airworthy, but ZU-BCR is is.

On display

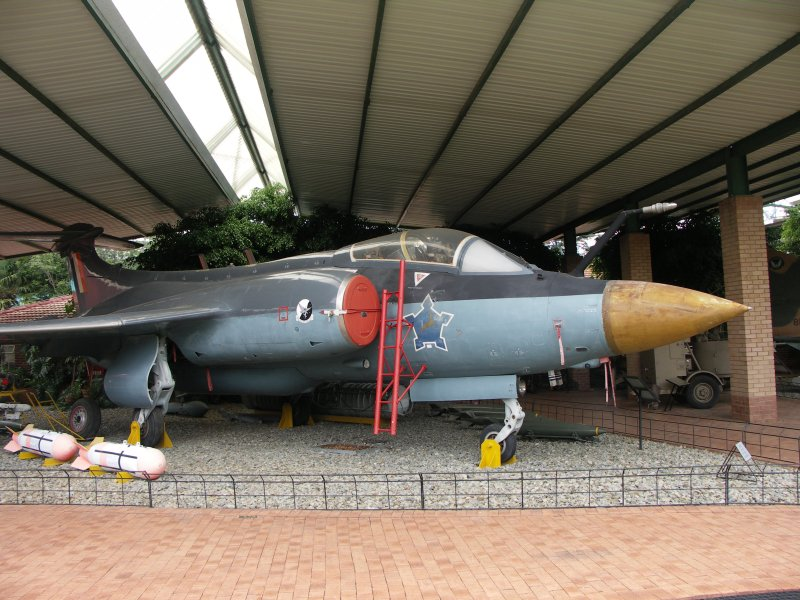
Buccaneer S.50 at the South African National Museum of Military History.

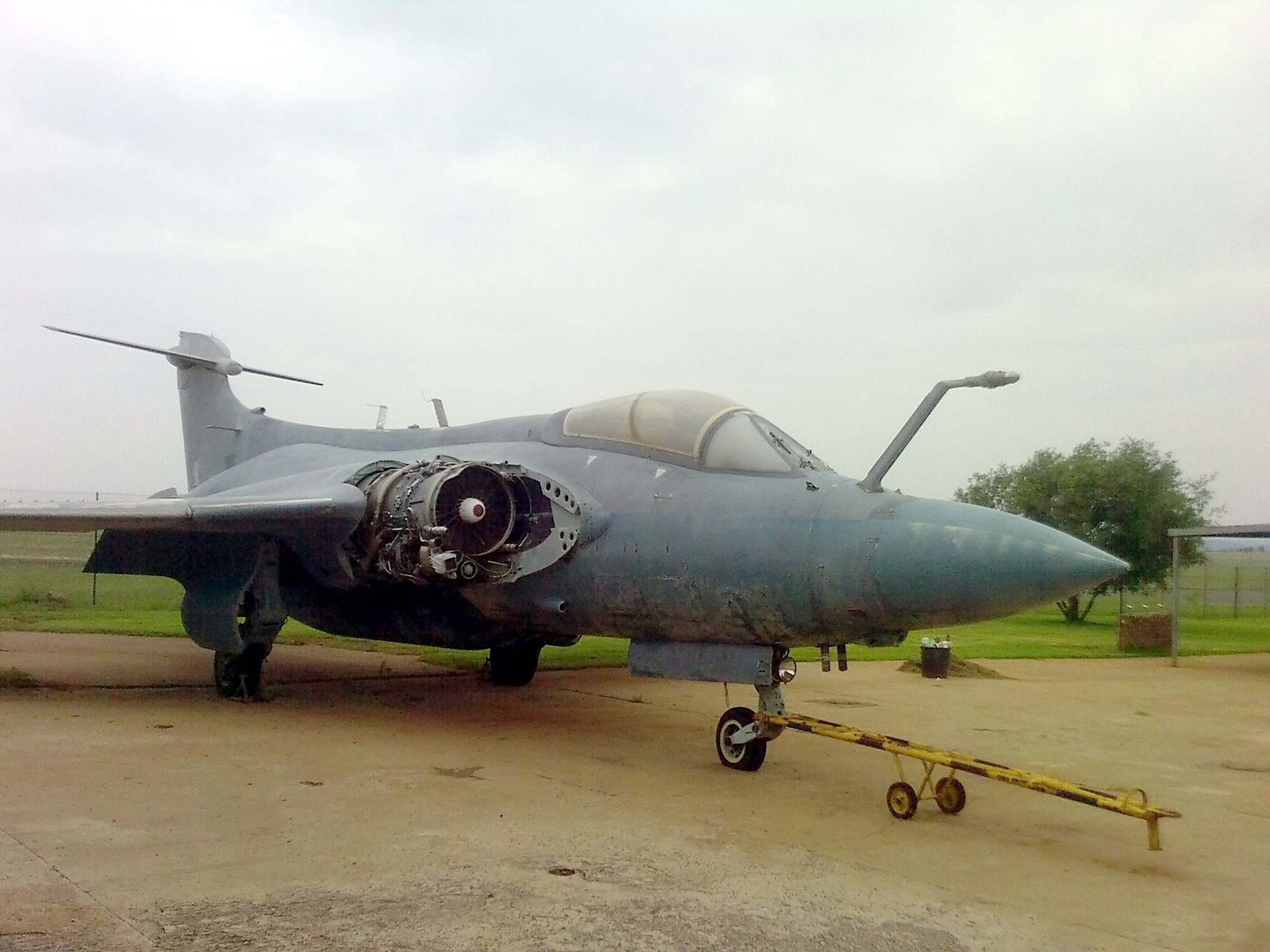
A Buccaneer S.50 at the South African Air Force Museum in 2008.

- Buccaneer S50, 412, gate guard at AFB Waterkloof, Pretoria.
- Buccaneer S50, 414, at the SAAF Museum, AFB Swartkop, Pretoria.
- Buccaneer S50, 416, at the SAAF Museum, AFB Ysterplaat, Cape Town.
- Buccaneer S50, 421, at the SAAF Museum, AFB Swartkop, Pretoria
- Buccaneer S50, 422, at National Museum of Military History, Saxonwold, Johannesburg

=== United Kingdom ===
On display

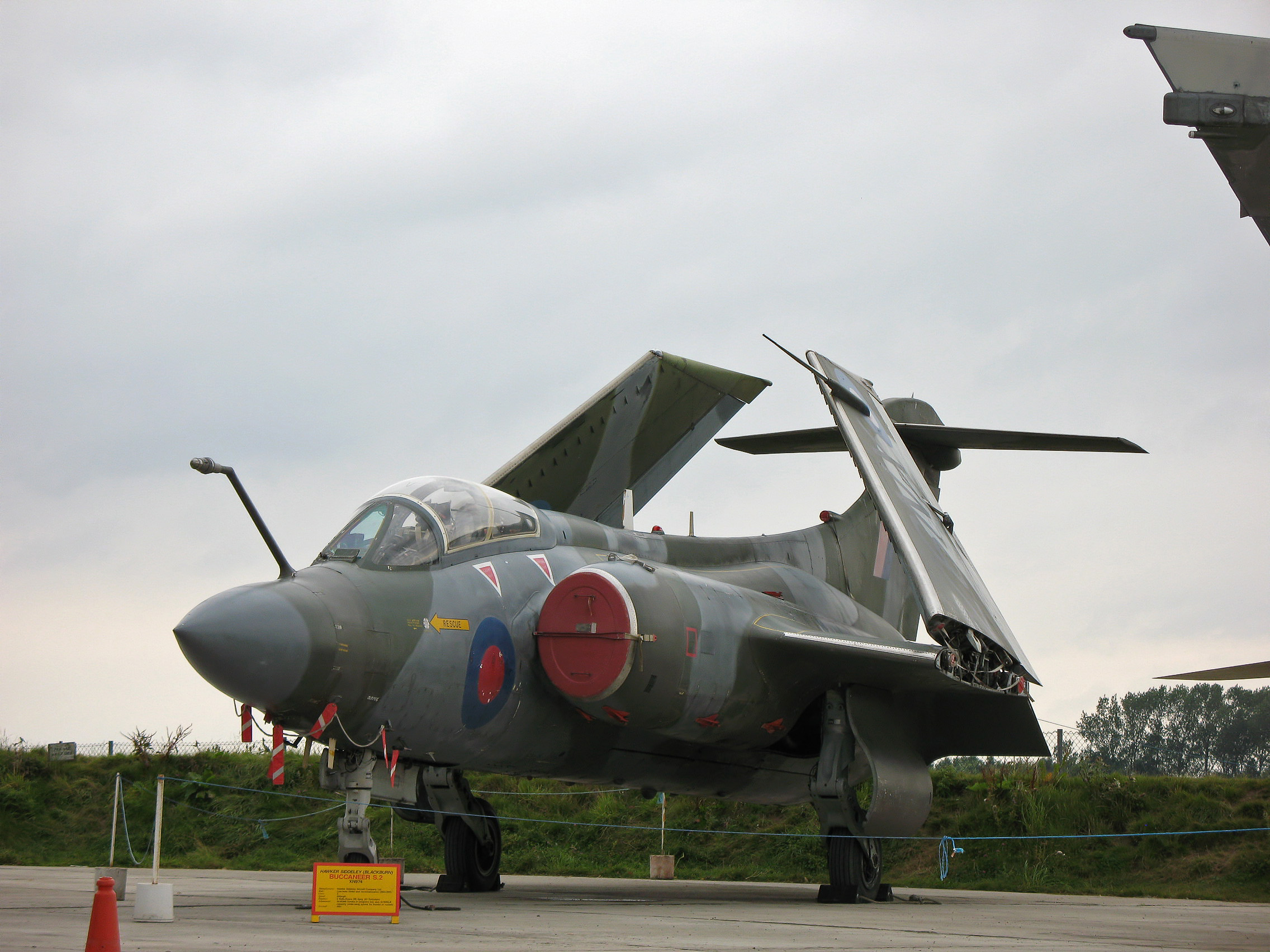
XN974 at the Yorkshire Air Museum, Elvington, North Yorkshire in 2007.

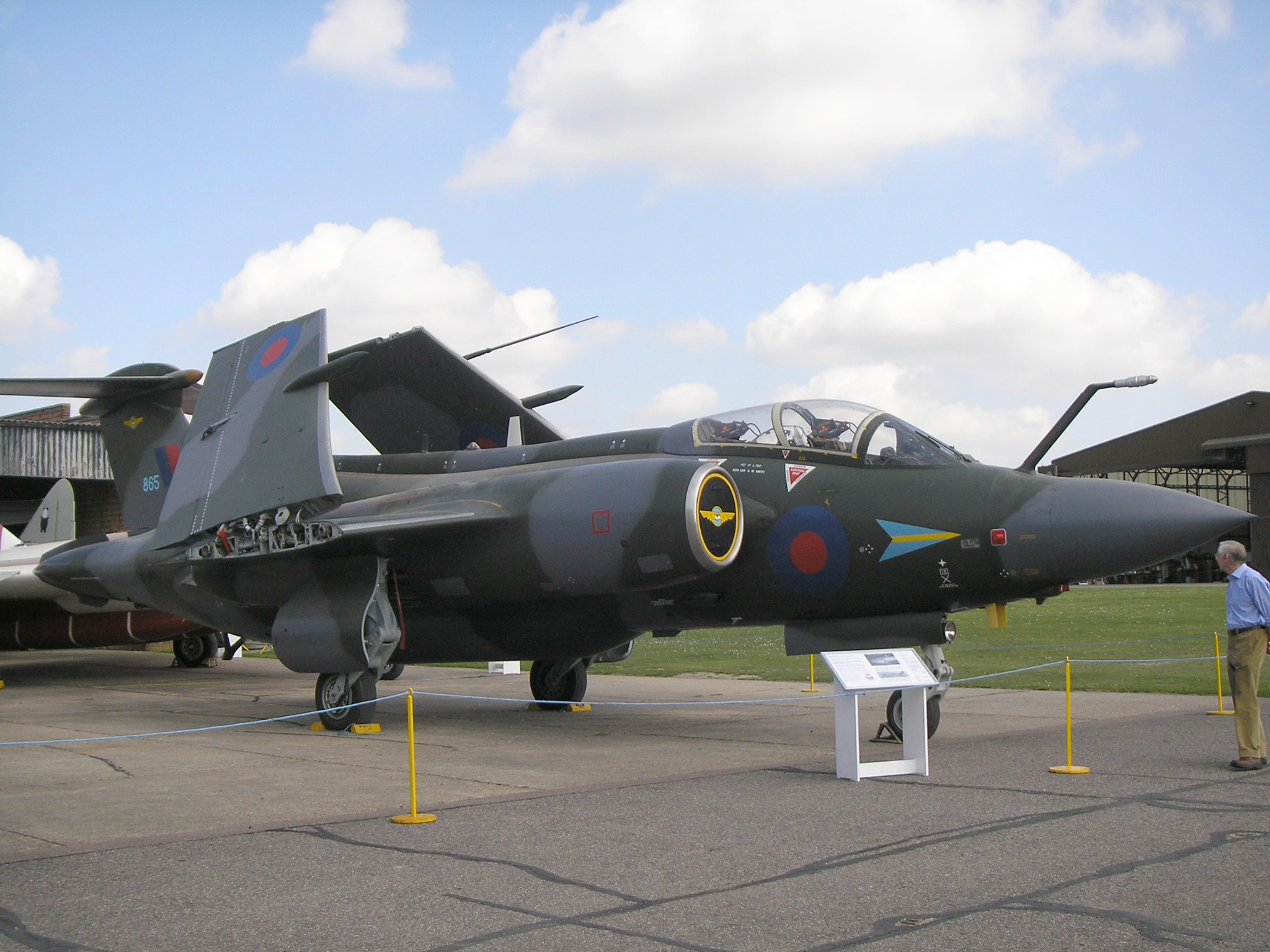
XV865 at IWM Duxford in 2006, in 208 Sqn. markings.

- Buccaneer S2, XK526, is at RAF Binbrook, Lincolnshire. As of 11 May 2025.
- Buccaneer S1, XK532, at the Highland Aviation Museum, Scotland.
- Buccaneer S1, XN923, at the Gatwick Aviation Museum, Surrey.
- Buccaneer S1, XN957, at the Fleet Air Arm Museum, RNAS Yeovilton, Somerset, coded '630'.
- Buccaneer S1, XN964, at the Newark Air Museum, Nottinghamshire, in Royal Navy markings coded '613'.
- Buccaneer S2B, XN974, is in taxi-able condition at the Yorkshire Air Museum, Elvington, North Yorkshire.
- Buccaneer S2B, XV168, was held by BAE Systems at Brough Aerodrome, East Yorkshire in No. 12 Squadron RAF markings, transferred to the Yorkshire Air Museum in August 2013.
- Buccaneer S2C, XV344, is on display as the gate guardian of the Defence Science and Technology at Farnborough Airport.
- Buccaneer S2B, XV350, at the Aeropark at East Midlands Airport.
- Buccaneer S2B, XV352, at the RAF Manston History Museum in Ramsgate, England.
- Buccaneer S2B, XV361, at the Ulster Aviation Society, Long Kesh, Maze, Lisburn, Northern Ireland.
- Buccaneer S2B, XV864, is on display at the RAF Manston History Museum in Ramsgate, England.
- Buccaneer S2B, XV865, in the markings of No. 208 Squadron RAF at the Imperial War Museum Duxford.
- Buccaneer S2B, XW530, is on display outside the Buccaneer Service Station at Elgin, Scotland. Edit: now on display at Scottish Deer Centre.
- Buccaneer S2B, XW544, is on display and has undergone restoration to full taxi-able condition, at Cotswold Airport, Kemble, Gloucestershire.
- Buccaneer S2B, XW547, in Gulf War camouflage coded 'R' at the Royal Air Force Museum, London.
- Buccaneer S2B, XX889, in Gulf War desert pink and the markings of No. 208 Squadron RAF at South Wales Aviation Museum, MOD St Athan, Wales.
- Buccaneer S2B, XX894, is in taxi-able condition at Cotswold Airport, Kemble, Gloucestershire, in the markings of 809 Naval Air Squadron coded '020'.
- Buccaneer S2B, XX900, is in taxi-able condition at Tatenhill Airport nr Burton on Trent Staffs
- Buccaneer S2B, XX901, is owned by the Buccaneer Aircrew Association, and is on display at the Yorkshire Air Museum, Elvington, North Yorkshire.

Stored or under restoration

- NA.39, XK488, is stored at the Fleet Air Arm Museum storage facility at Cobham Hall, Yeovilton, Somerset.
- Buccaneer S2B, XT288, at the National Museum of Flight, Scotland.
- Buccaneer S2B, XV333, at the Fleet Air Arm Museum, Yeovilton, Somerset, in the markings of 801 Naval Air Squadron coded '234'.
- Buccaneer S2B, XV359, is held at a private collection in Devon, England, in the markings of 809 Naval Air Squadron coded '035'.
- Buccaneer S2B, XX885, (registered G-HHAA) is under restoration at the former RAF Scampton, Lincolnshire and was being rebuilt to flying condition by Hawker Hunter Aviation; it was granted UK CAA permission to fly in April 2006, but this effort has stalled, and the airframe has now been stored for over a decade.
- Buccaneer S2B, XX895, (cockpit section only) is held at a private collection in Oxfordshire.
