= Cavanaugh Flight Museum =

Aviation museum in Addison, Texas

- Established: 1993
- Location: 4572 Claire Chennault St; Addison, Texas 75001
- Coordinates: 32.972648°N 96.835393°W
- Type: aviation museum
- Visitors: 33,000 (2006)
- Founder: Jim Cavanaugh
- Director: Doug Jeanes
- Public transit access: Dallas Area Rapid Transit bus route 341
- Website: Cavanaugh Flight Museum

The Cavanaugh Flight Museum was a nonprofit aviation museum at Addison Airport in Addison, Texas. It closed indefinitely as of January 1, 2024.

== Mission ==
The museum promoted aviation education, research, and American aviation heritage. It also provided aircraft restoration, maintained and displayed historically significant vintage aircraft, some of which were in flyable condition, and maintained an aviation collections department featuring aviation artwork.

== History ==
The aircraft collection held by the museum began as the personal collection of businessman Jim Cavanaugh. His collection began with the purchase of a half-share in a 1939 Piper J-3 Cub in 1980. The museum opened in October 1993.

On December 29, 2023, the museum announced it would be closing indefinitely on January 1, 2024. A spokesperson for the town of Addison told WFAA that the museum's lease had been terminated to allow the site to be redeveloped as new hangars, office space, and parking. Then, its aircraft were to be moved to North Texas Regional Airport in Denison, Texas, but would not state whether the collection would be returned to public display.

== Exhibits and collections ==
The flight museum housed an aviation art gallery that includes pieces from Keith Ferris, Roy Grinnell, William Phillips, John Shaw, Stan Stokes, Robert Taylor, and Nicholas Trudgian.

=== B-29 FIFI project ===
In a January 2008 press release, the Commemorative Air Force and the Cavanaugh Flight Museum pledged U$1.2M to re-engine FIFI, a B-29 Superfortress. The pledge was made by Jim Cavanaugh, museum founder. As a result of the contribution, FIFI was returned to flight status, and the B-29/B-24 Squadron of the CAF was relocated from Midland, Texas, to Addison Airport. The B-24 and the B-29 were, for the six months of each year they were not on tour, kept and maintained at Addison. FIFI was sent to Meacham International Airport in Fort Worth during winter.

FIFI was based at the Cavanaugh Flight Museum until 2013, when it was relocated to the Vintage Flying Museum at Meacham.

== Partial list of collection ==
=== World War I ===
- Fokker D.VII
- Fokker Dr.I
- Halberstadt CL.II
- Pfalz D.III
- Sopwith Camel

=== World War II ===
Manufacturer	Model	Serial number	Notes
de Havilland	Tiger Moth		
Aeronca	L-3B	43-26886	
Boeing-Stearman	N2S-4 Kaydet		
Boeing-Stearman	PT-13C Stearman Kaydet	40-1650	
Curtiss	P-40N Warhawk	44-7396	
Douglas	A-26C Invader	44-35710	Hard to Get
Fairchild	PT-19A Cornell	42-34560	
General Motors	FM-2 Wildcat	86956	
General Motors	TBM-3E Avenger	86280	
Goodyear	FG-1D Corsair	92339	
Heinkel	CASA 2.111(He 111)		Spanish built version of He 111. 9K+FZ
Hispano	HA-1112-M1L	C.4K-172	Markings on side <- + -
North American	AT-6/SNJ Texan	42-85697	
North American	B-25J Mitchell	44-28925	How ‘Boot That!
North American	B-25H Mitchell	43-4106	Barbie III
North American	P-51D Mustang	44-72339	
Piper	L-4J	45-55210	
Ryan	PT-22 Recruit	41-15334	
Supermarine	Spitfire Mk. VIII	MT719	
Vultee	SNV-2/BT-13 Valiant	44177	
Yak	Yak-3M	0410101	

=== Korean War ===
Manufacturer	Model	Serial number	Notes
Beachcraft	T-34A Mentor	53-3362	
Bell	OH-13D Sioux	65-8040	
Douglas	A-1H Skyraider	52-139606	
Douglas	EA-1E Skyraider	135152	
Grumman	F9F-2B Panther	123078	
Grumman	S2F-1 Tracker	136431	
Lockheed	F-104A Starfighter	56-0779	
Mikoyan Gurevich	MiG-15 UTI	512036	
North American/Canadair	F-86 Sabre Mk. IV	51-2821	
Panstwowe Zaklady Lotnicze (PZL)	TS-11 Iskra		
Sikorsky	UH-34D Seahorse	150213	

=== Vietnam War ===
Manufacturer	Model	Serial number	Notes
Bell	AH-1J Sea Cobra	159220	
Bell	UH-1B Iroquois	62-4567	
Cessna	T-41B Mescalero	62323-70	
Hughes	OH-6A Cayuse	69-16006	
LTV	A-7E Corsair II	160615	
McDonnell-Douglas	F-4C Phantom II	64-0777	
Mikoyan Gurevich	MiG-17F	1228	
Mikoyan Gurevich	MiG-21US	04685145	
Republic	F-105F Thunderchief	63-8543	

=== Civilian aircraft ===
- Christen Eagle II
- Piper J-3 Cub
- Pitts Special
- Travel Air 4000

== See also ==
- List of aerospace museums
