= List of surviving Curtiss P-40s =

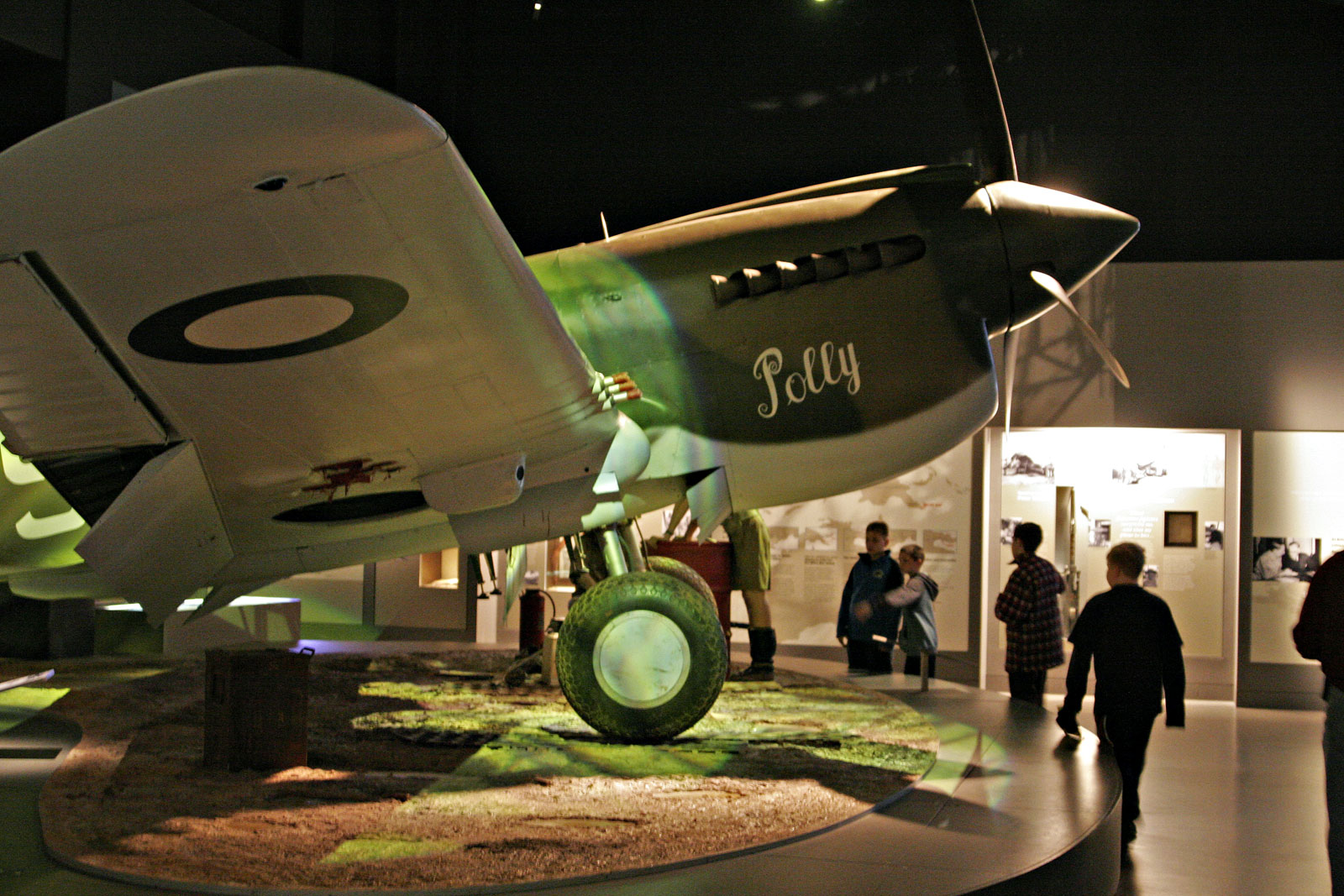
P-40E-1CU 41-36084 RAAF P-40E Kittyhawk A29-133 Polly Australian War Memorial

The Curtiss P-40 was an American single-engine, single-seat, all-metal fighter and ground attack aircraft. Flown by the air forces of 28 nations, when production of the P-40 ceased in November 1944, 13,738 had been built.

== Background ==
By the fall of 1944, the United States Army Air Forces had already retired most of the early versions (P-40B/P-40L) and was in the midst of withdrawing the final variants from combat units. By VJ Day, the only remaining P-40 were in Operational Training Units (OTUs). These aircraft were struck-off charge and placed into storage. Most foreign users of the P-40 also quickly retired their P-40s as well – the Royal New Zealand Air Force (RNZAF) stored their last P-40s in 1947 (scrapping them by 1962) and the last military to use the P-40 operationally was the Brazilian Air Force who used them until the late 1950s.

In 1947 the Royal Canadian Air Force (RCAF) auctioned off their surplus P-40s. Mr. Fred Dyson purchased 35 P-40Es, Ms and Ns for $50.00 each, and barged them from Vancouver to Seattle to resell. Other ex-RCAF P-40s were purchased to strip the aircraft of hardware, which was in short supply after the war. For the next 30 years the RCAF machines would make up the majority of the flying P-40s. The FAA classified P-40Es and Ms as experimental aircraft, restricting their operations. The P-40N was in the limited category typical for most warbirds, but to circumvent FAA regulations many P-40Es were licensed as P-40Ns.

With the start of the Korean War in 1950, the USAF delayed its plans to retire the P-51 Mustang, and the Canadian P-40s were the only high performance aircraft available. It was not until the late 1950s that the P-51 became available but by this time, the Kittyhawks/Warhawks had found a popular niche for airshows. Having an aircraft which could be painted in AVG markings made them popular.

From the mid 1970s to late 1980s, collectors from the United States started traveling to former South Pacific airfields and recovered a second generation of P-40 survivors. The majority of these were RNZAF and Royal Australian Air Force (RAAF) veterans. Examples are still being returned to airworthy status.

The fall of the Soviet Union in the late 1980s made a third generation of P-40s survivors available and numerous examples were recovered from former battlefields near Murmansk. Other examples also included airframes being recovered from Alaskan wartime crashes during this same time frame.

There are still numerous example of wrecked P-40s that have yet to be recovered in China, United States, Canada as well as Russia in addition to the South Pacific sites. Many governments regulate wreck site recoveries and have placed many off-limits so as to remain untouched as grave sites, somewhat limiting further recoveries.

== Surviving aircraft ==
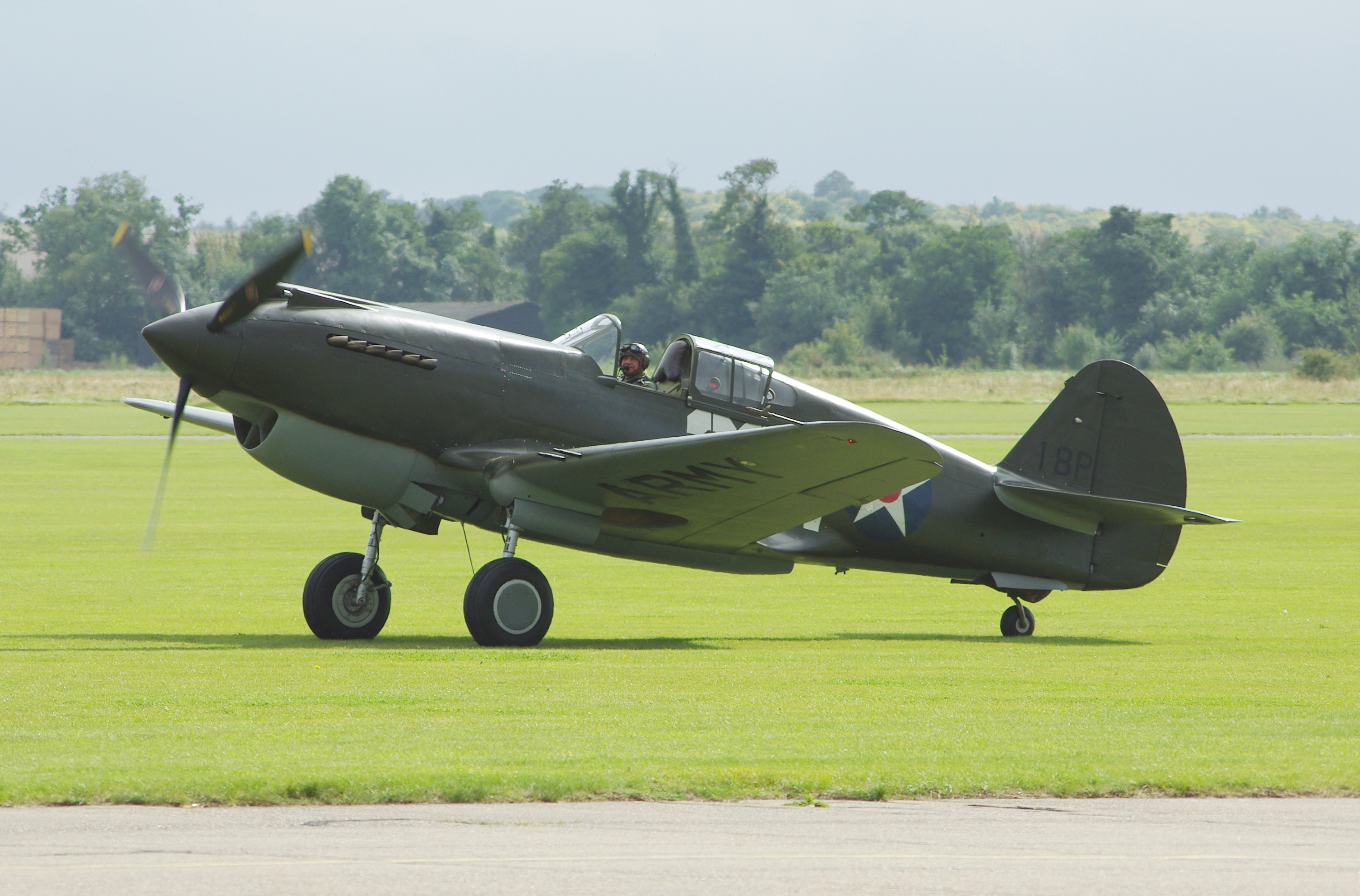
Curtiss P-40B G-CDWH at Duxford 2008, the world's oldest airworthy type.

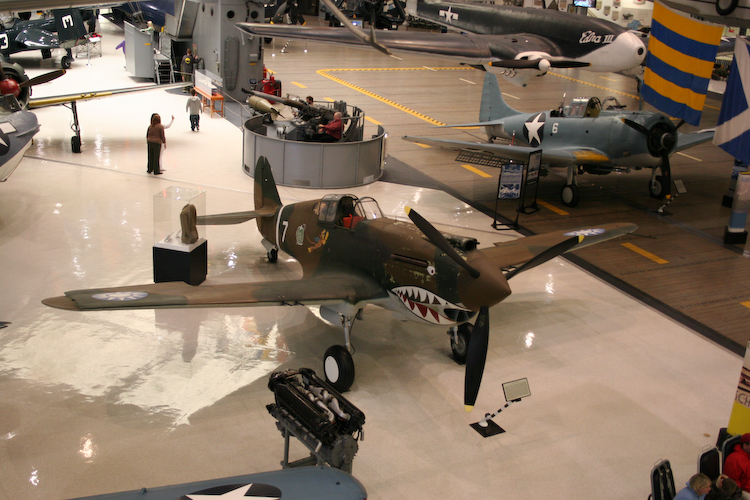
Hawk 81A-3 / Tomahawk IIb AK255, National Naval Aviation Museum

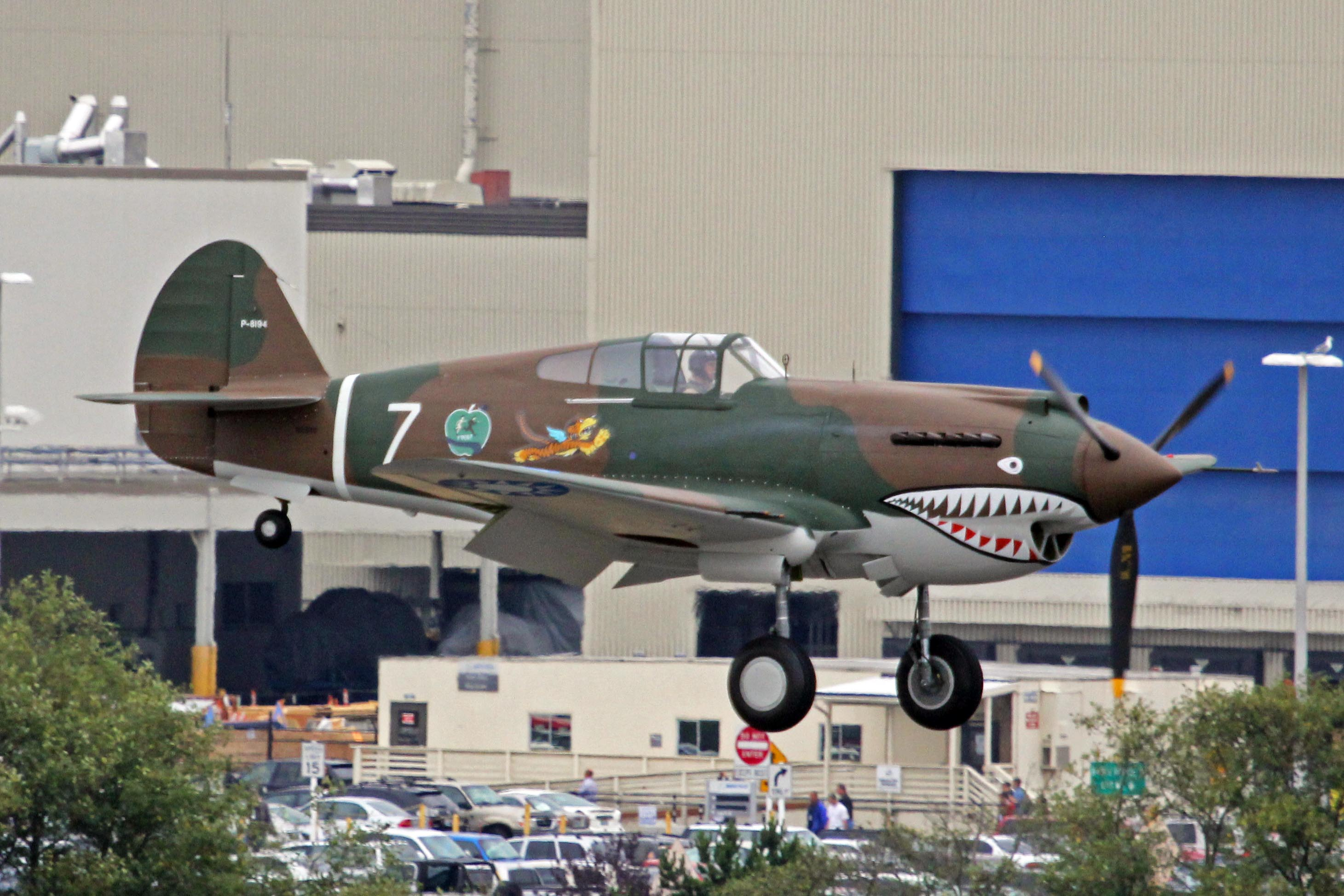
Curtiss P-40C at Flying Heritage Collection

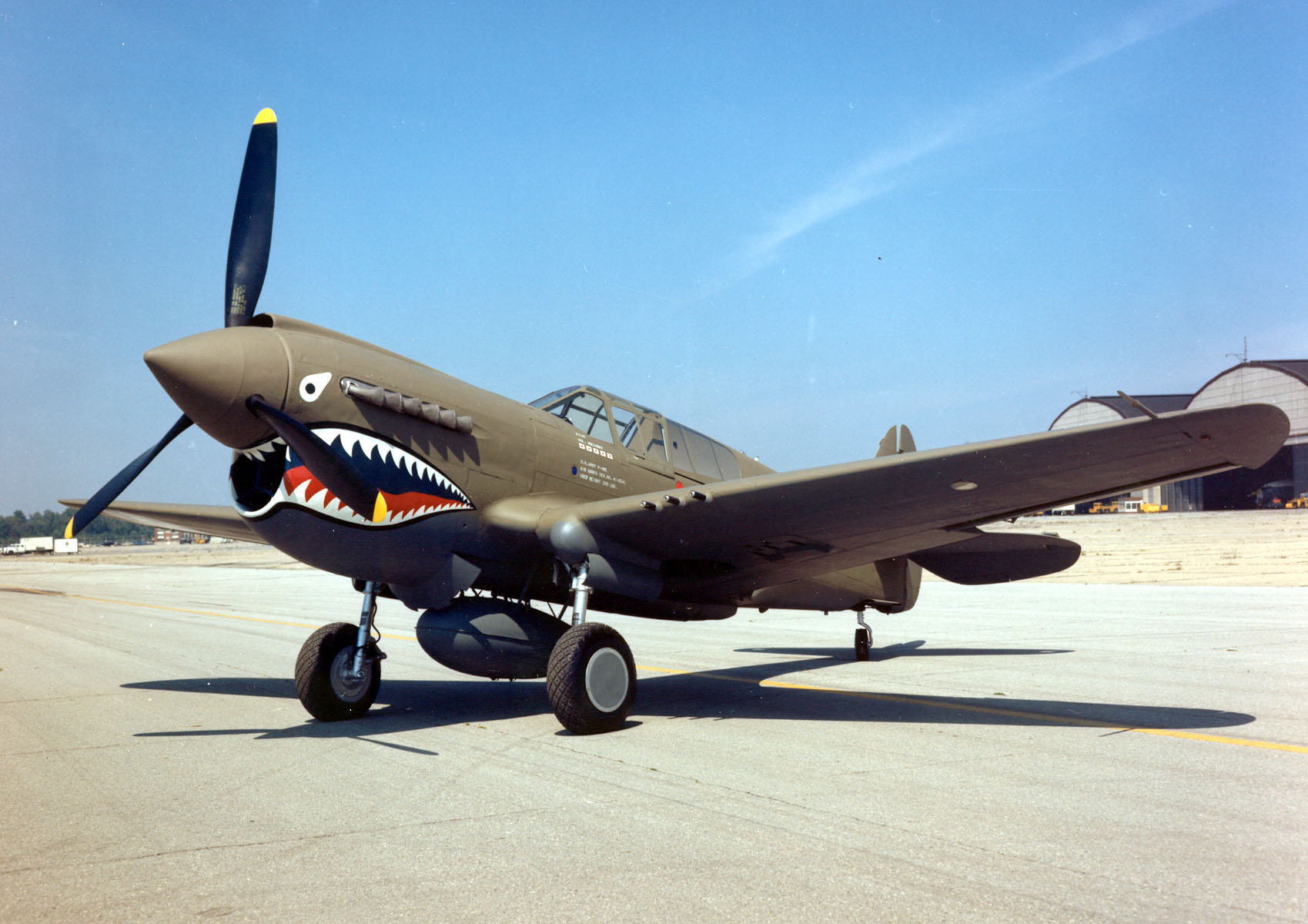
Hawk 87A-3 AK987 RCAF 1068 NMUSAF

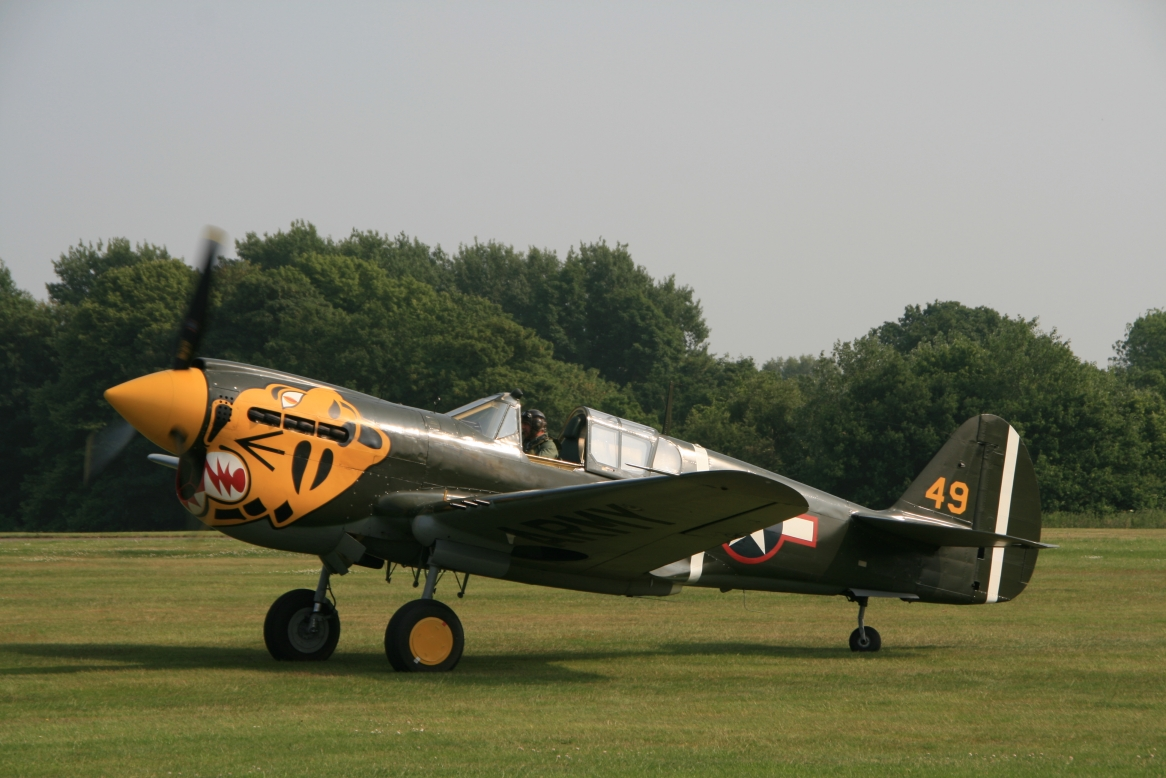
P-40M-10CU 43-5802 in Aleutian Tiger markings.

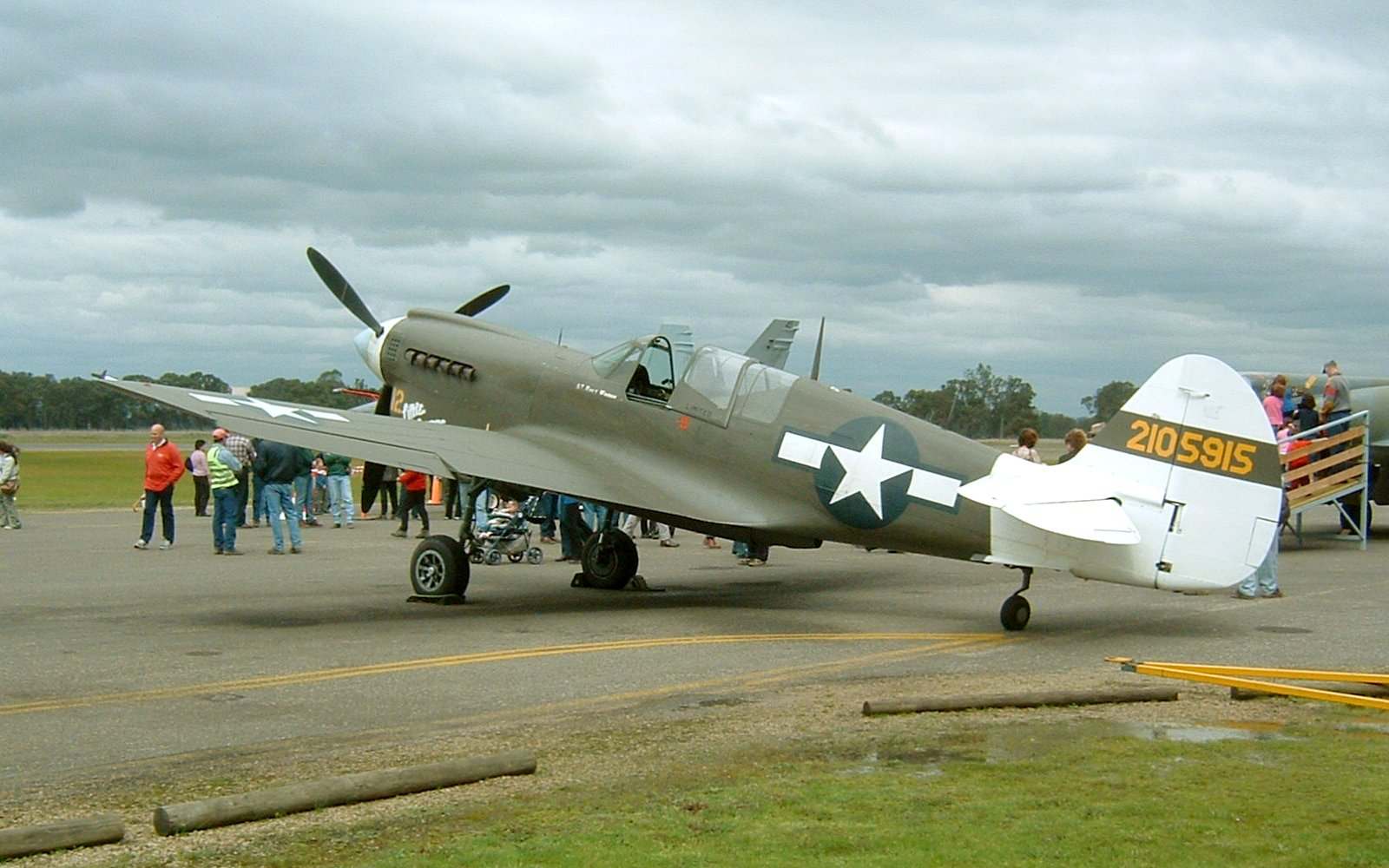
P-40N-5-CU 42-105915 Little Jeanne

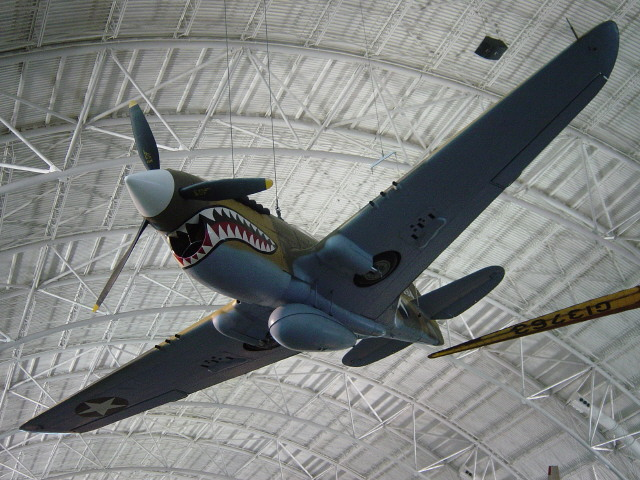
Hawk 87A-3 AK875 RCAF 1044 Lope's Hope NASM

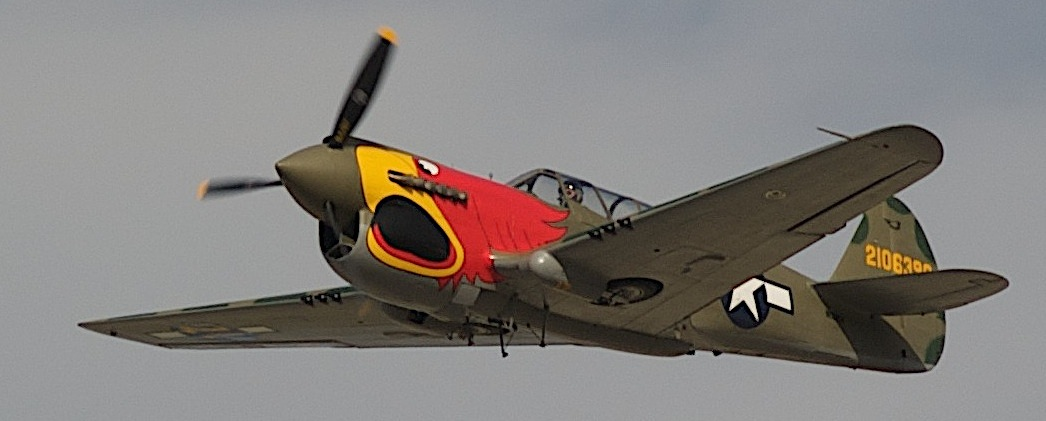
P-40N-15CU 42-106396 Parrot Head

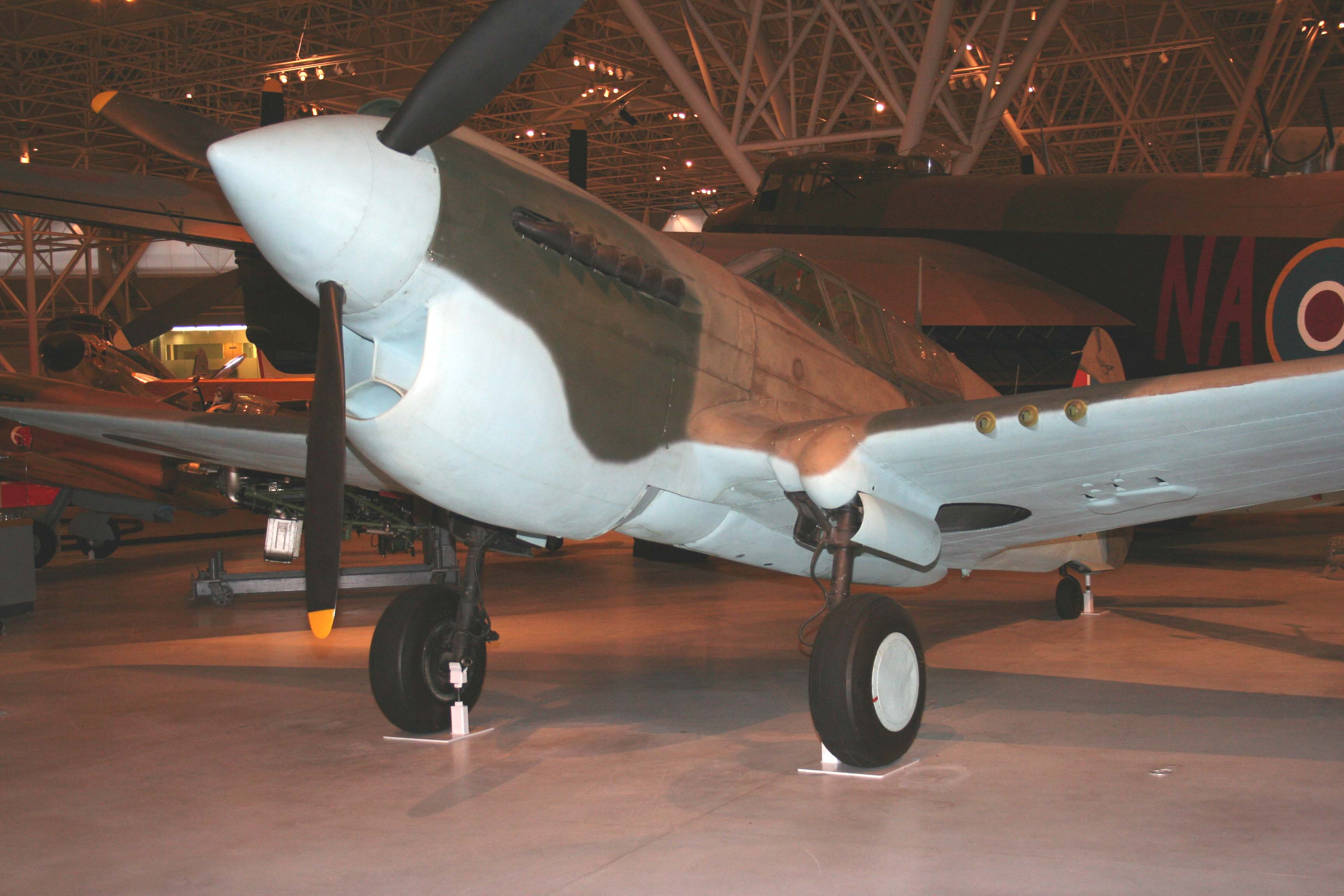
Hawk 87A-3 AL135 RCAF 1076 Canada Aviation Museum

=== Australia ===
Airworthy

P-40E

- 41-25109/VH-KTY – owned by Pay's Air Service PTY LTD in Scone, New South Wales. Was NZ3094 with the RNZAF.
- 41-25158/VH-AK4 – owned by Andrew Kennedy in Gunnedah, New South Wales. This P-40 was NZ3009 with RNZAF. It was famously owned by the Old Flying Machine company from 1994 to 2002 and flown by Ray Hanna. The aircraft made its first flight in Australia on April 24th 2024 in the hands of Kennedy.

P-40F

- 41-14112/VH-HWK – owned by Judy Pay of the Old Aeroplane Company in Tyabb, Victoria.

P-40N

- 42-104687/VH-ZOC – owned by Arthur Pipe & Steel Australia PTY LTD in East Albury, New South Wales. Was NZ3125 in RNZAF service.
- 42-104986/VH-PFO – owned by the P40N PTY LTD in Caboolture, Queensland. This P40 is a combat veteran having seen service over New Guinea. On February 14th 1944 the aircraft shot down a KI 61 but was forced to crash land because of damage sustained during the battle. Pilot Nelson D. Flack, Jr survived the crash and made it back to Allied lines after 17 days in the jungle. His plane was discovered in 2004 and brought to Australia for restoration. The aircraft took flight on March 3rd 2016 in the hands of then owner Doug Hamilton.

On display

P-40E

- 41-36084 (RAAF serial A29-133) – Australian War Memorial in Canberra.

P-40N

- 42-104947 – Precision Aerospace/Pacific Fighters Museum in Victoria, Australia.

Under restoration

P-40E

- 41-35974/VH-AJY – owned by Reevers Pastoral PTY LTD in Mylor, South Australia.
- 41-5336 (RAAF serial A29-28) – RAAF Museum in RAAF Point Cook, Victoria.
- 41-5632 (RAAF serial A29-71) – under restoration by Ben Saunders in Melbourne, Victoria.
- 41-13522 (RAAF serial A29-53) – under restoration by Moorabbin Air Museum in Melbourne, Victoria.
- 41-35984 – under restoration by P-40E Syndicate in Queensland.
- 41-36843 – under restoration by Murray Griffiths in Deniliquin, New South Wales.

P-40N

- 42-104954 – under restoration by Edwin Sedgman in Melbourne, Victoria.
- 42-104728 (RAAF serial A29-446) – under restoration by Keith W. Hopper in Wangaratta, Victoria.
- 42-105472 – under restoration by Bruno Carnival in Melbourne, Victoria.
- 42-105513 – under restoration by Ian Whitney Romsey, Victoria.

=== Belgium ===
Airworthy

P-40E

- 41-13570/OO-WHK – restored for Pioneer Aero Ltd, Ardmore, Auckland. Equipped with two seats and dual control. Recovered from a lake in Russia in August 1997.

=== Brazil ===
P-40N

- 44-7700 – Museu Aerospacial, Rio de Janeiro.

=== Canada ===
On display

P-40E

- AL135 – Canada Aviation Museum in Ottawa.

=== Egypt ===
P-40

- ET574 – Found in the desert in 2012. As of 2018, displayed at a museum in El Alamein in a faux paint scheme.

=== France ===
Airworthy

P-40N

- 42-105915 – Christian Amara/SDPA in La Ferté-Alais.

Wrecks

- s/n unknown – A fairly complete wreck of a P-40 is immersed in 18 feet of water near the semi-decommissioned French fleet air arm station of Aspretto, Ajaccio, Corsica. It was found in much deeper waters by military divers and moved in present time location for training purposes. It is theoretically off limits but has been much dived in the past 30 years, images and video footage are visible on internet.

=== Italy ===
P-40L

- 42-10857 – on display in its recovered condition at the Piana delle Orme near Latina, Lazio.

=== New Zealand ===
P-40E

- 41-36385/NZ3039 – Museum of Transport and Technology in Auckland.

P-40F

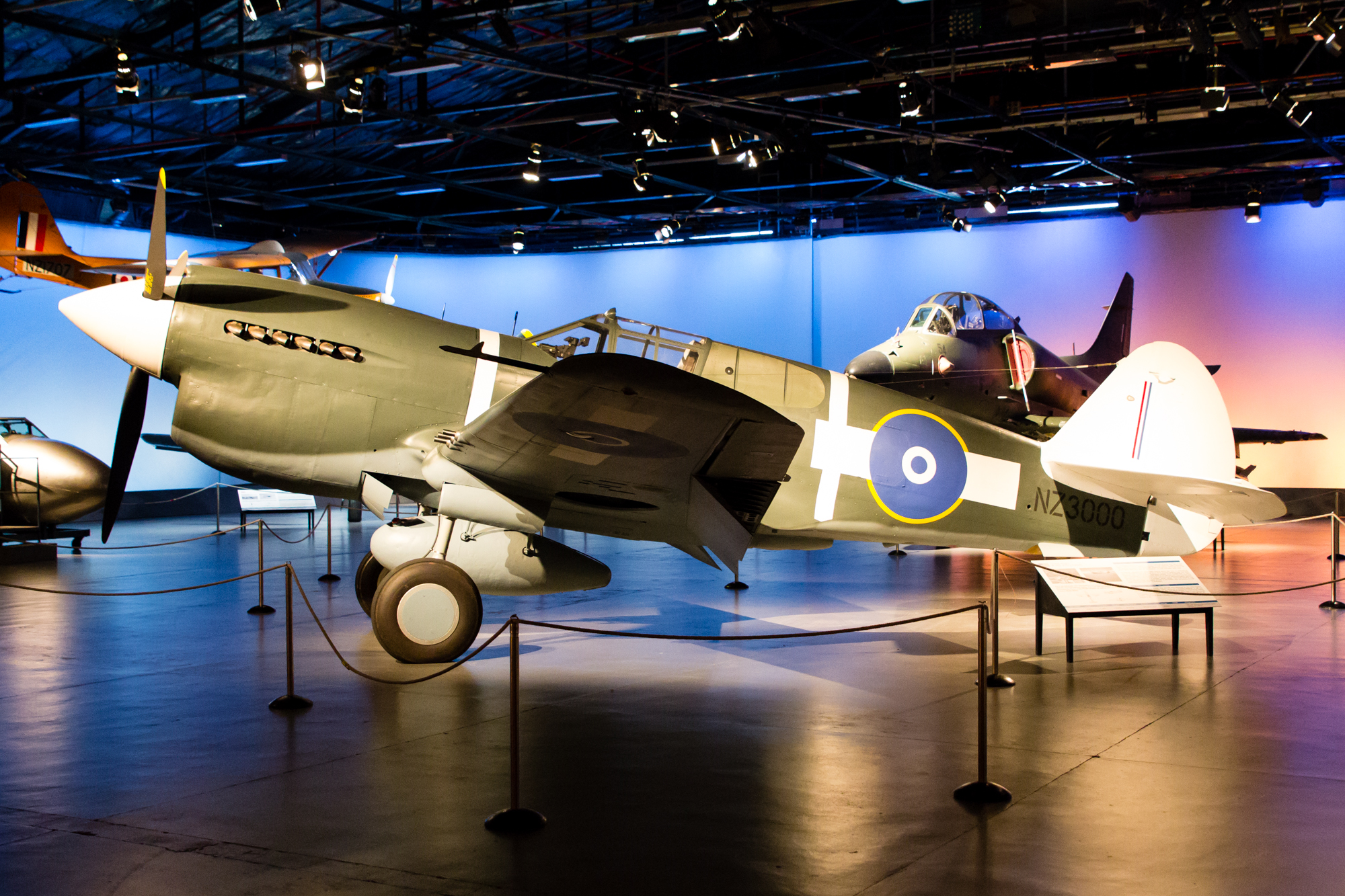
P-40F 41-14205

- 41-14205 – restored to E-model status and on display at the RNZAF Museum in represented RNZAF colours as "NZ3000".

P-40N

- 43-22962/NZ3220 – on display at the Omaka Aviation Heritage Centre on loan from the Smith family, Blenheim, New Zealand.

Under restoration

P-40E

- 41-35916 – under restoration to fly for John Saunders at Omaka Airfield using some ex-RNZAF parts. Will be dual control.
- 41-36410/NZ3043 – restoration to airworthy by Mike Nicholls and John Saunders at Omaka Airfield in Blenheim, New Zealand.

P-40N

- 42-104751/NZ3147 – restoration to flying with Pioneer Aero Ltd, Ardmore Airfield for Brett Nicholls. Rebuild will include rear seat and dual controls

Stored

P-40K

- 42-10178/A29-183 – stored pending restoration by Graham Orphan in Blenheim.

=== Thailand ===
P-40C

- AK498 – on display as a crashed diorama at the Royal Thai Air Force Museum.

=== United Kingdom ===
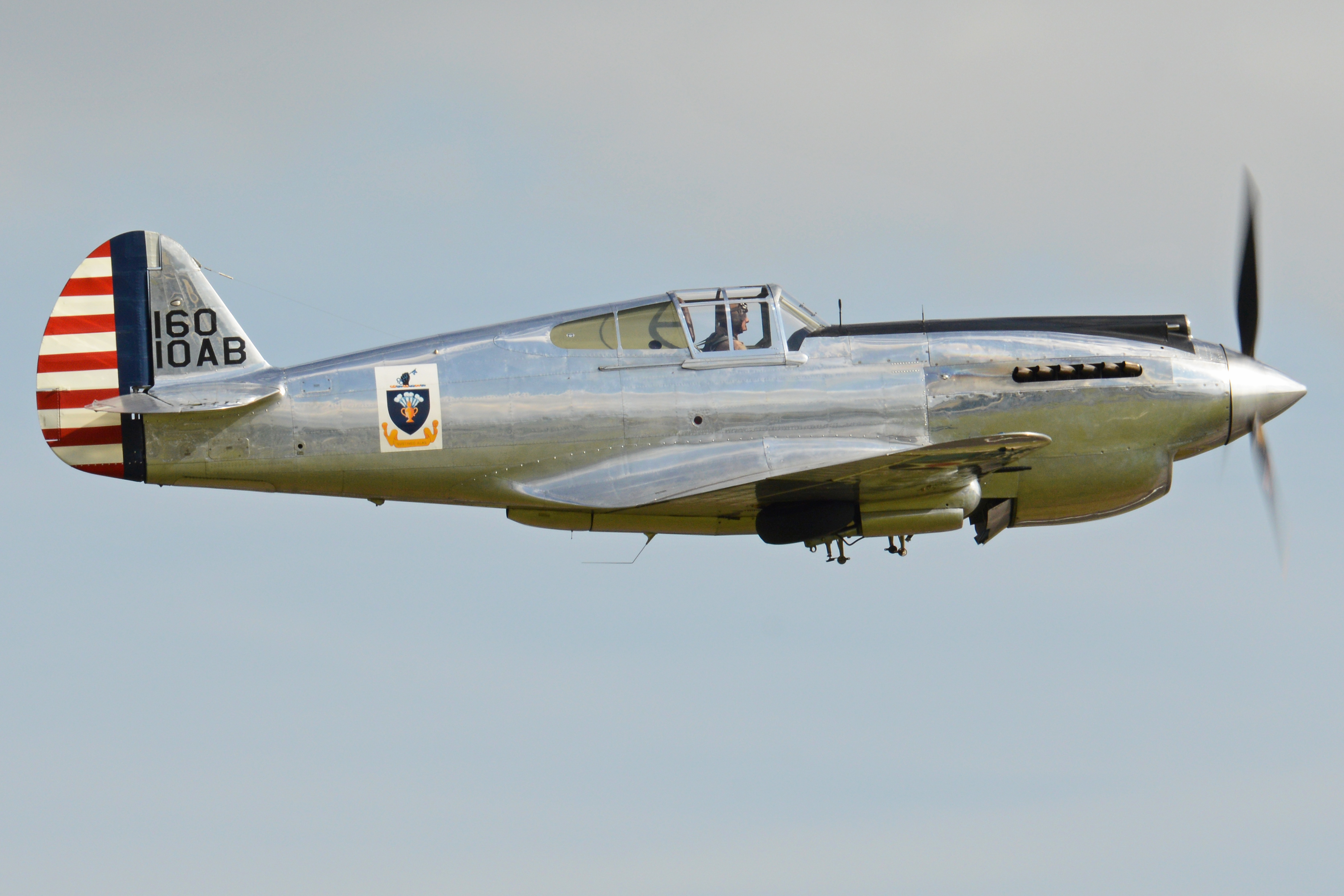
P-40C 41-13357 seen during 2016 Flying Legends Airshow at Duxford Airfield, Cambridgeshire, UK

Airworthy

P-40C

- 41-13357 – The Fighter Collection at IWM Duxford.

P-40F

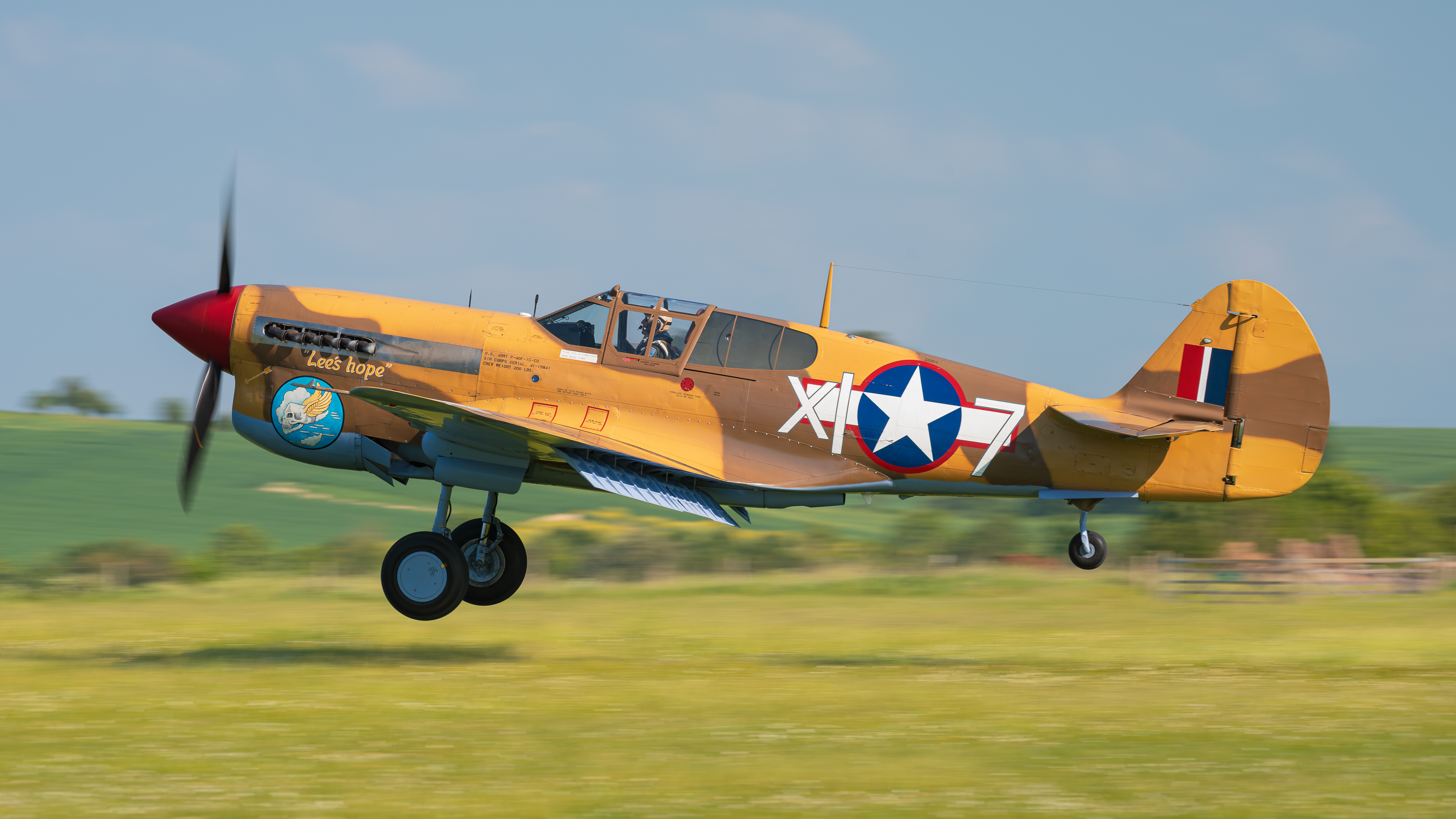
P-40F 41-19841 “Lee's Hope” landing at Duxford.

- 41-19841 – The Fighter Collection at IWM Duxford.

P-40M

- 43-5802 – Hangar 11 Collection in North Weald, Essex.

On display

P-40N

- 42-106101/A29-556 – Royal Air Force Museum London.

Under Restoration

P-40N

- 42-104949 Kathleen II – to airworthiness by Southern Aircraft Consultancy Inc. Trustee in Bungay, Suffolk. Flown by the comedian Dan Rowan in World War II.

=== United States ===
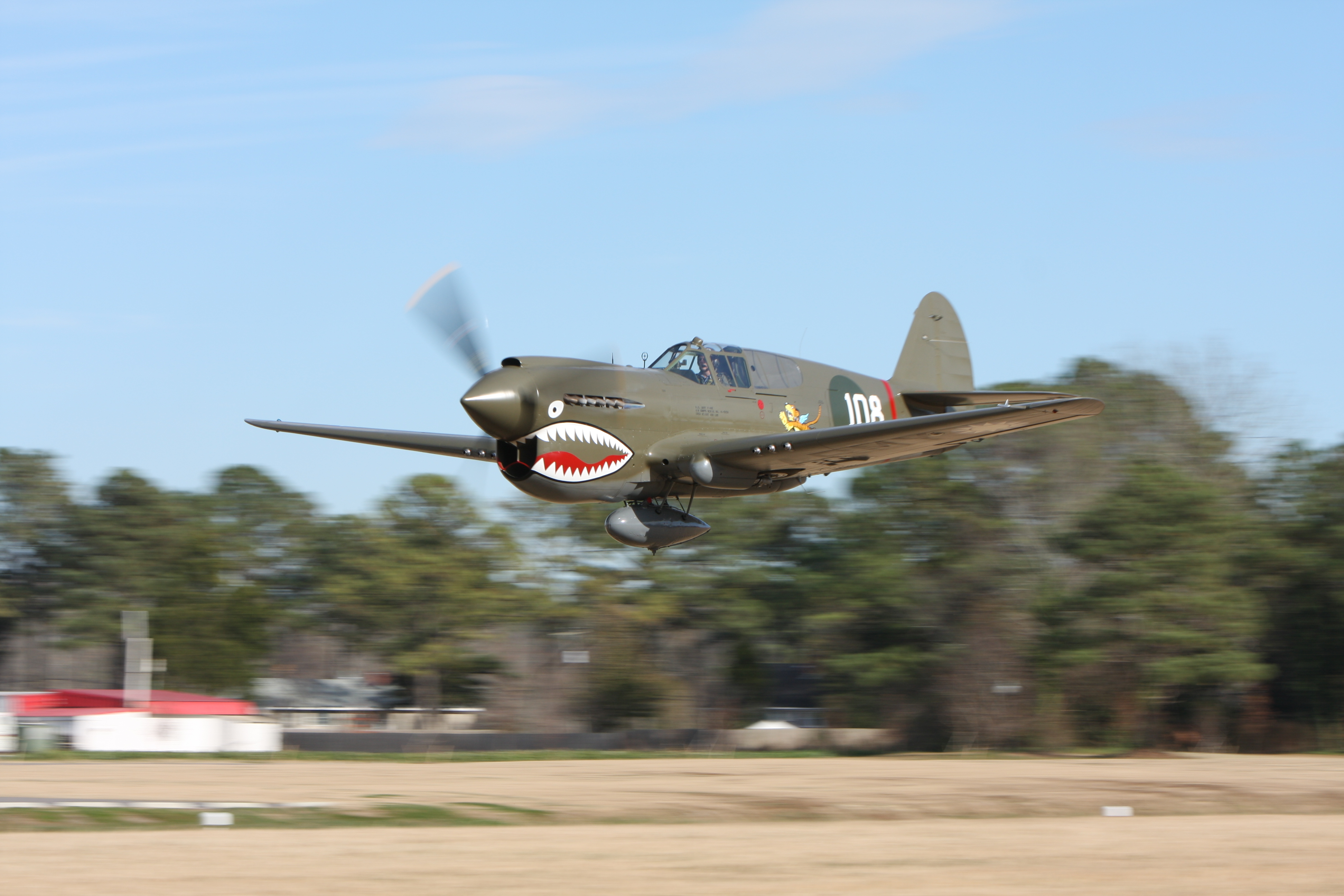
P-40E 41-35918 Military Air Museum in Virginia Beach, Va.

Airworthy

P-40B

- 41-13297 – based at American Heritage Museum in Hudson, Massachusetts.

P-40C/Tomahawk IIB

- 41-13390 – based at Flying Heritage Collection in Everett, Washington.
- AK295 – privately owned in Hillsboro, Oregon.

P-40D/Kittyhawk I

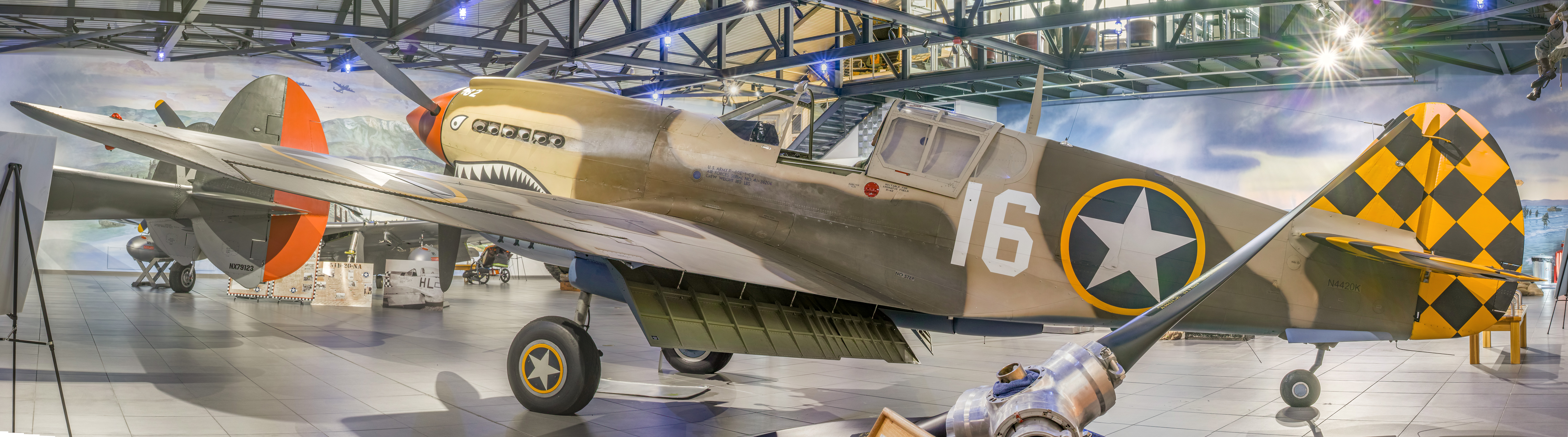
P-40D at the Fagen Fighter Museum

- AK752 – based at Stonehenge Air Museum in Lincoln County, Montana.
- AK827 – based at Yanks Air Museum in Chino, California.
- AK905 – based at Frasca Air Museum in Champaign, Illinois.
- AK933 – based at Warhawk Air Museum in Nampa, Idaho.
- AK940 – based at Erickson Aircraft Collection in Madras, Oregon. Painted as 41-13521.
- AL152 – based at War Eagles Air Museum in Santa Teresa, New Mexico.

P-40E/Kittyhawk IA

- ET564 – based at Military Aviation Museum in Virginia Beach, Virginia.
- 41-5709 – based at Dakota Territory Air Museum in Minot, North Dakota.

P-40K

- 42-9733 – privately owned in Danville, Illinois.
- 42-10083 – based at Fagen Fighters WWII Museum in Granite Falls, Minnesota.
- 42-10256 Aleutian Tiger – based at Mid America Flight Museum in Mount Pleasant, Texas.

P-40M

- 43-5508 – privately owned in Houston, Texas.
- 43-5795 The Jacky C II – based at American Airpower Museum in Farmingdale, New York.
- 43-5813/NZ3119 – based at Tri-State Warbird Museum in Batavia, Ohio.

P-40N

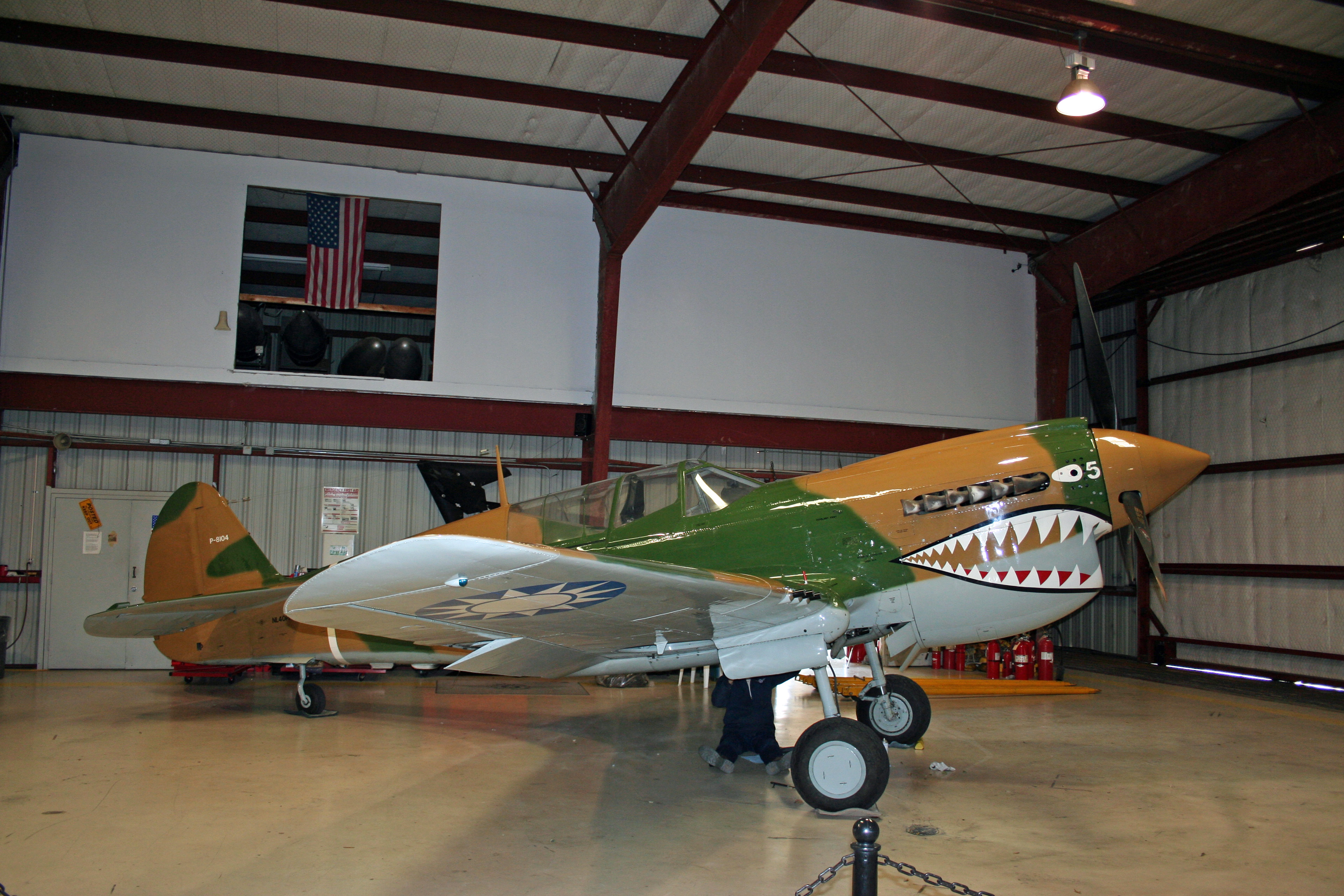
P-40N at the Cavanaugh Flight Museum

- 42-104730/A29-448 Currawong - privately owned in Eugene, Oregon by the Soaring by the Sea foundation, who recently reactivated the guns. Previously registered as ZK-CAG in New Zealand.
- 42-104827 – privately owned in Huntington, Indiana.
- 42-104977 – privately owned in Winter Park, Florida.
- 42-105120 – privately owned in Okeechobee, Florida.
- 42-105192 – based at Planes of Fame in Chino, California.
- 42-105306 – based at North Bay Air Museum in Sonoma, California.
- 42-105861 – privately owned in Clarkston, Washington.
- 42-105867 – based at Commemorative Air Force (P-40 Sponsor Group) in Fredericksburg, Texas.
- 42-105875 – privately owned in Eugene, Oregon. Operated as NZ3184 with the RNZAF. Restored to flight in early 2023 in Wangaratta, Victoria, Australia, after restoration by Precision Airmotive. It was later shipped to the U.S.
- 42-106396 – based at Warhawk Air Museum in Nampa, Idaho.
- 44-7084 – based at Palm Springs Air Museum in Palm Springs, California.
- 44-7369 – based at Cavanaugh Flight Museum in Addison, Texas. Removed from public display when the museum indefinitely closed on 1 January 2024. To be moved to North Texas Regional Airport in Denison, Texas.

TP-40N

- 44-47923 – based at Fantasy of Flight in Polk City, Florida. Operated by museum owner Kermit Weeks and registered N923, it is the world's only airworthy trainer-variant P-40. Additionally, the aircraft was briefly featured at the beginning of the 1973 CBS made-for-television movie Birds of Prey, starring David Janssen and Ralph Meeker.
- 42-104721 – based at Collings Foundation in Stow, Massachusetts. This is a rebuild of the same aircraft that originally was at Evergreen, which was based on the wreck of P-40K 42-9749, recovered from Alaska where it had originally served in the Aleutians, and originally restored as a P-40K. Now the airframe has been rebuilt as a factory-built TP-40N with the serial number 42-104721 newly assigned, an identity from a wrecked and parceled-out P-40N that was recovered from New Guinea where it had originally served with the RAAF as A29-499.

On display

P-40C/Tomahawk IIB

- AK255 – National Naval Aviation Museum at NAS Pensacola in Florida.

P-40D/Kittyhawk I

- AK875 – Steven F. Udvar-Hazy Center of the National Air and Space Museum in Chantilly, Virginia.

P-40E/Kittyhawk IA

- AK803/1034 – Erickson Aircraft Collection in Madras, Oregon. Formerly resident at Victoria International Airport in British Columbia and the Omaka Aviation Heritage Centre, Blenheim. For sale as of June 2020.
- AK979 – Pearl Harbor Aviation Museum on Ford Island in Pearl Harbor, Hawaii. This airplane was the mascot of the former Flying Tiger Line, currently owned by FedEx, and is maintained in airworthy condition (but not in current inspection status).
- AK987 – National Museum of the United States Air Force at Wright-Patterson AFB in Dayton, Ohio.

P-40N

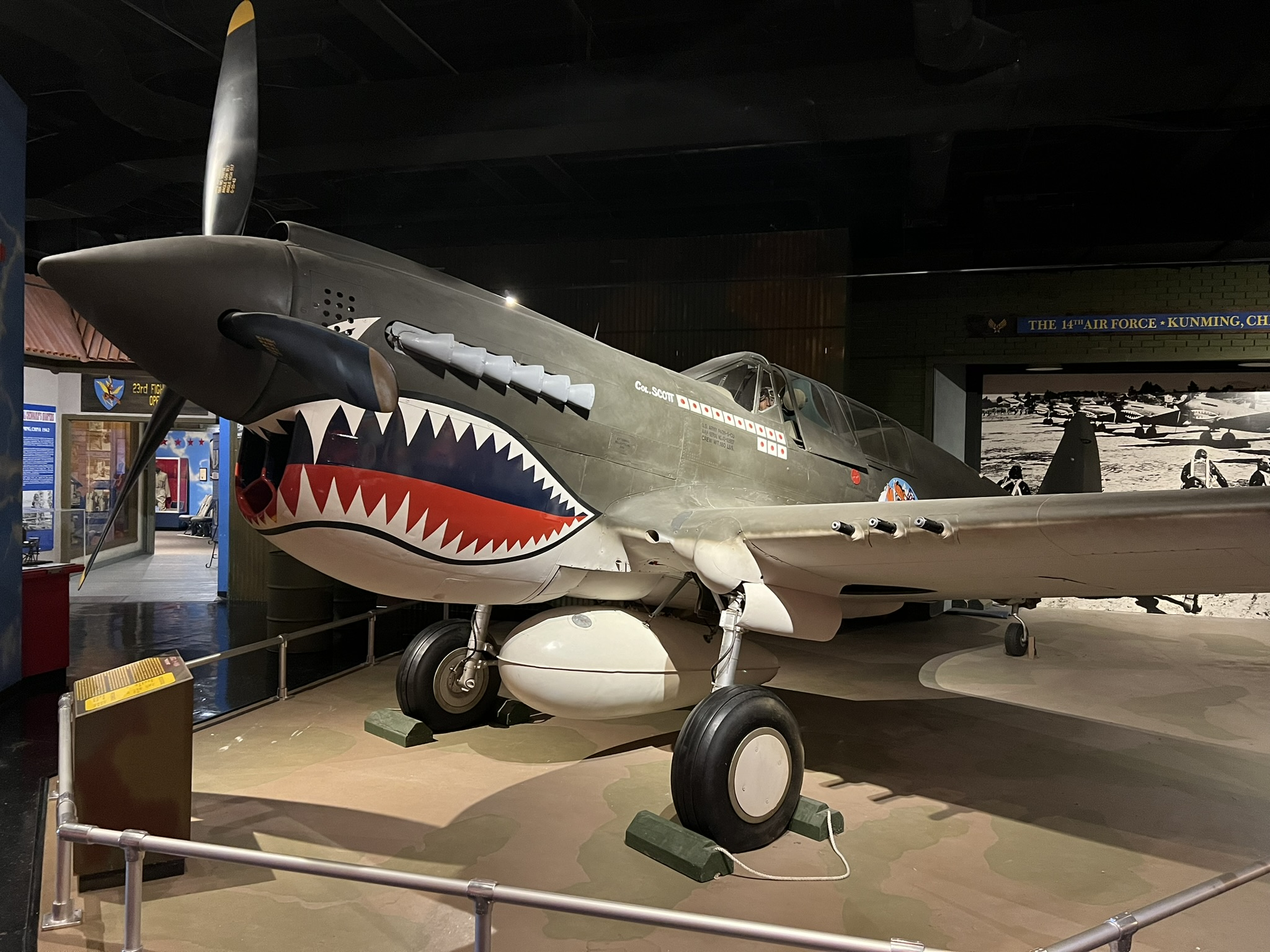
P-40N on display at the Museum of Aviation

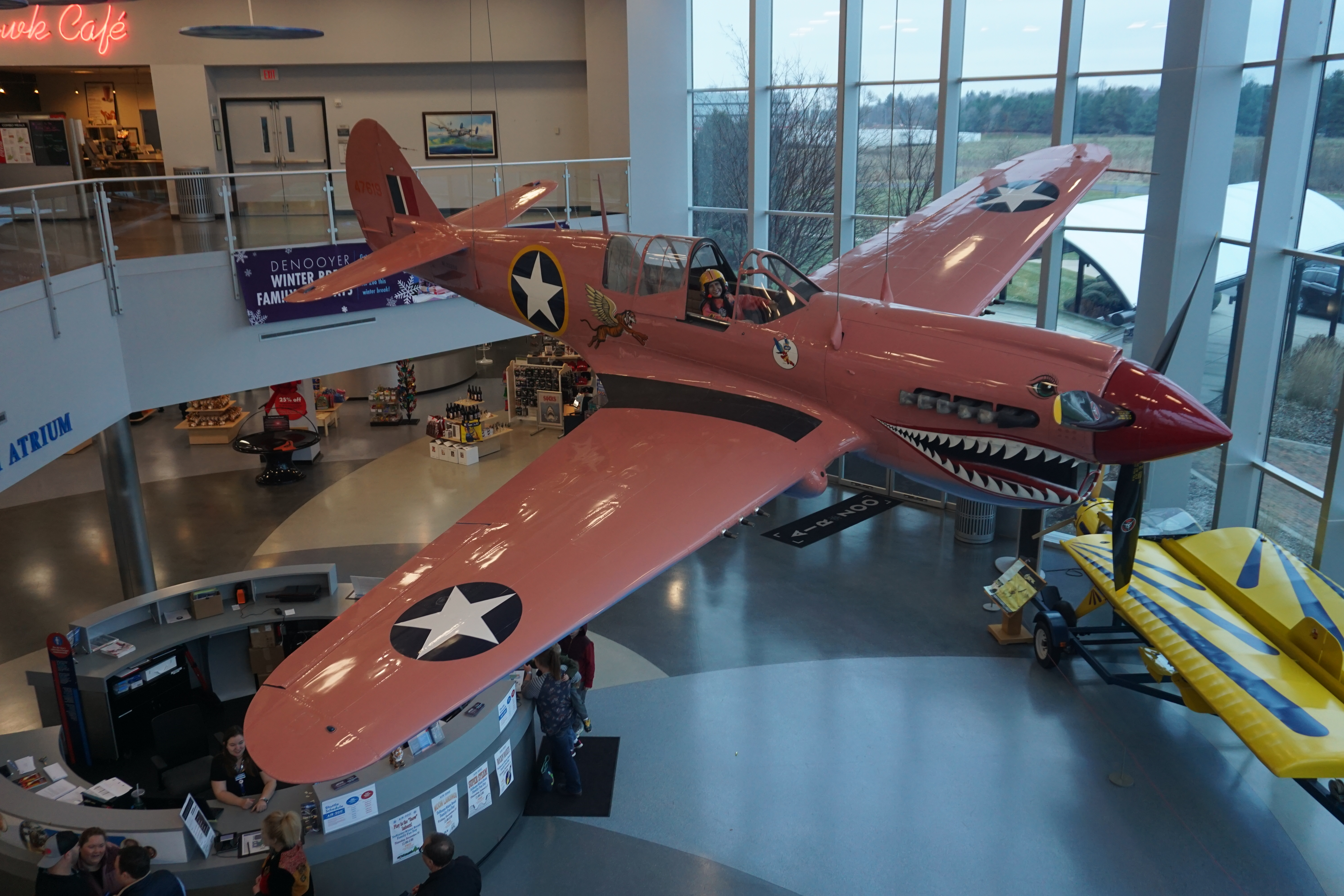
Sue Parish's P-40 on display at the Air Zoo

- 42-105270 – Hill Aerospace Museum at Hill AFB in Utah. This aircraft is actually a composite of a P-40E fiberglass replica and a wrecked P-40N recovered from Alaska. The dataplates were unreadable so the Hill Aerospace Museum chose the serial number of a scrapped P-40 that had been flown by the same squadron that the wrecked aircraft belonged to.
- 42-105927 – Museum of Aviation at Robins AFB in Warner Robins, Georgia.
- 44-7192 – Museum of Flight in Seattle, Washington.
- 44-7619 – Air Zoo in Kalamazoo, Michigan.

Under restoration or in storage

P-40D/Kittyhawk I

- AK863 – in storage at Fagen's Fighters WWII Museum in Granite Falls, Minnesota.
- AL171 – in storage at Fantasy of Flight in Polk City, Florida.

P-40E/Kittyhawk IA

- 40-401 – stored pending restoration to airworthiness by private owner in Sonoma, California.

P-40K

- 42-45946 – stored pending restoration to airworthiness by private owner in Anchorage, Alaska.
- 42-45984 – for static display at the Pima Air & Space Museum adjacent to Davis-Monthan Air Force Base in Tucson, Arizona. Crashed in 1942 in New Guinea, it was recovered in 2000 and donated to the Pima Air & Space Museum in 2002.

P-40N

- 42-104818/A29-405 – stored pending restoration by private owner in California.
- 42-104959 – stored pending restoration to airworthiness by private owner in Wilmington, Delaware.
- 42-104961 – for static display at the Pima Air & Space Museum adjacent to Davis-Monthan Air Force Base in Tucson, Arizona. Crashed in 1943 in New Guinea, it was recovered in 1974 by the Military Aircraft Restoration Corporation and loaned to the Pima Air & Space Museum in 2004.
- 42-105079 – stored pending restoration to airworthiness by private owner in Springfield, Illinois.
- 42-106109 – stored pending restoration to airworthiness by private owner in Albuquerque, New Mexico.

== Replicas ==
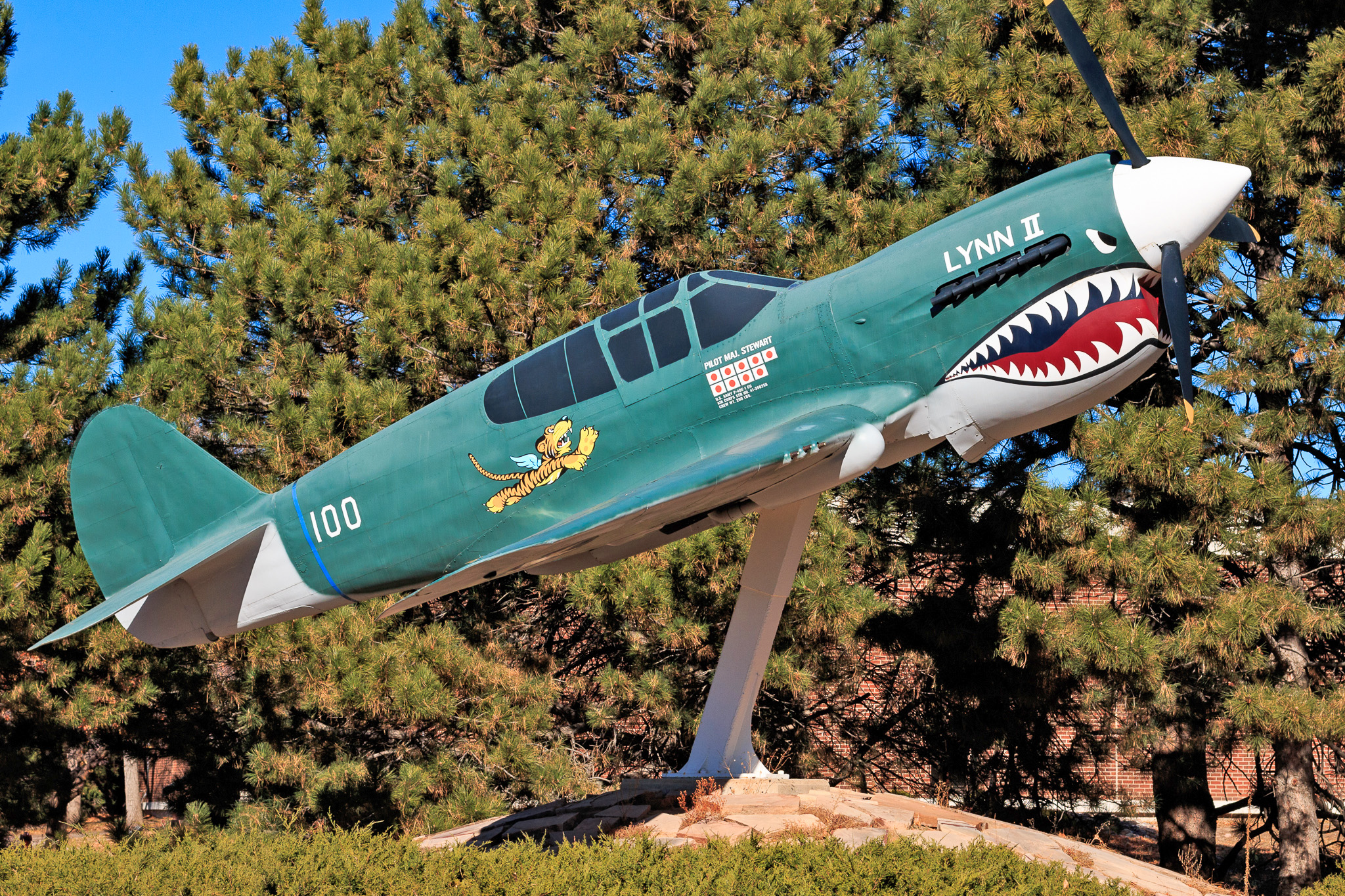
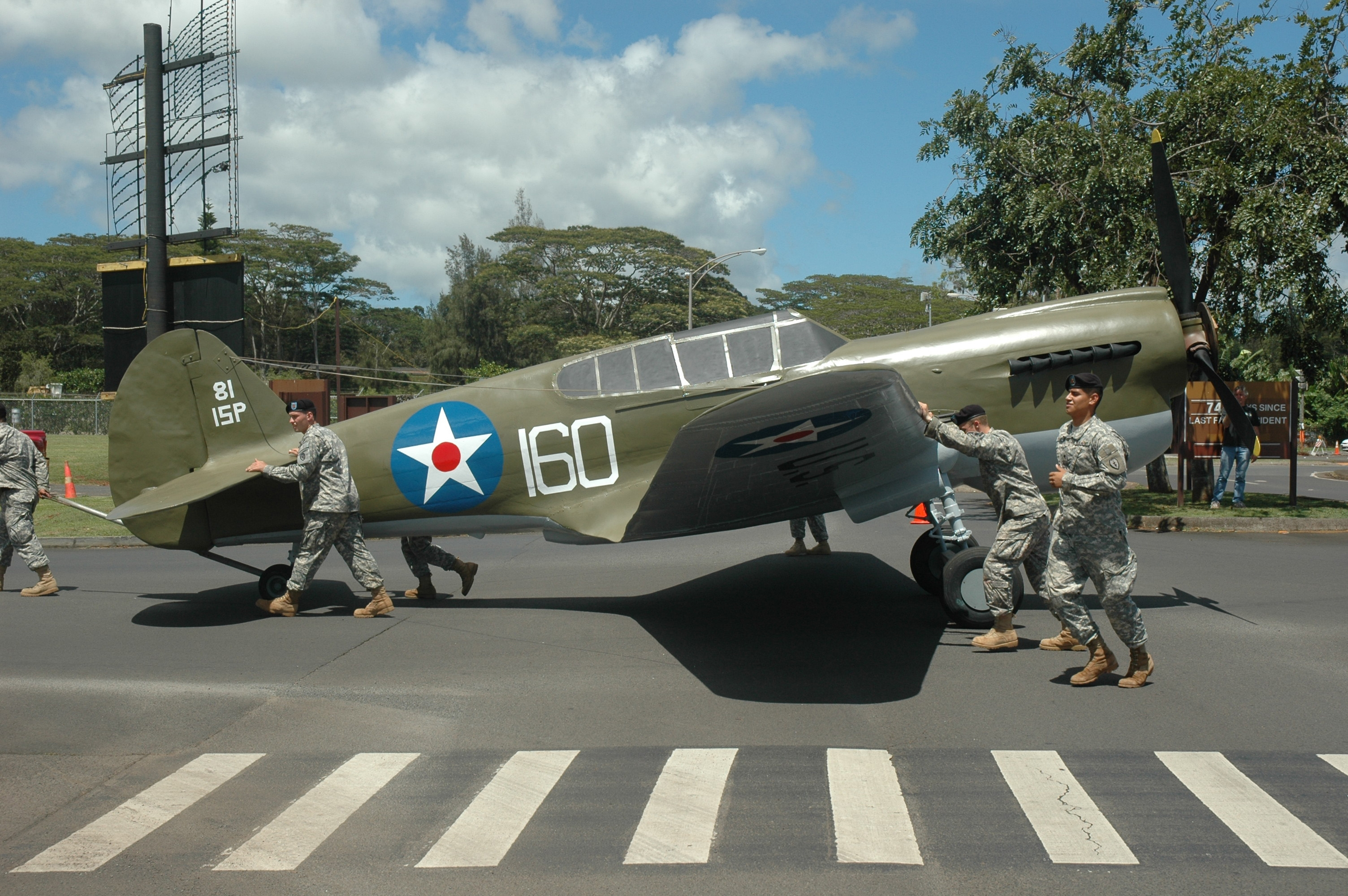
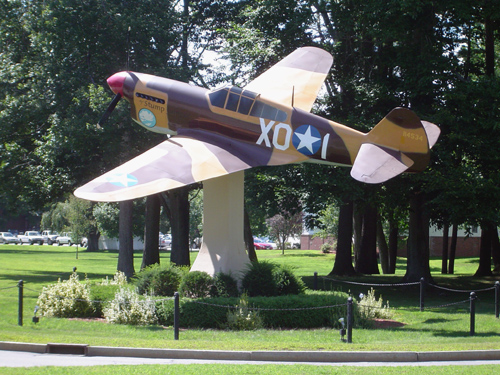
P-40 replicas at (from left) Peterson Air and Space Museum, Wheeler AAF, and Hanscom AFB
- P-40 mounted on pad at Wheeler AAF (former Wheeler AFB), Hawaii.
- P-40 mounted on pylon at Hanscom AFB, Massachusetts.
- P-40 (s/n 191) suspended from wires in the USS Kidd Veterans Museum in Baton Rouge, Louisiana.
- P-40E mounted on pylon at Peterson Air and Space Museum in Colorado Springs, Colorado.
- P-40E (taxiable) displayed at the Classic Flyers Museum in Tauranga, New Zealand. Includes parts from P-40E and P-40N wrecks.
- P-40E suspended from wires in Hangar 37 of the Pearl Harbor Aviation Museum, Ford Island, Hawaii.
- P-40 mounted on a pylon at Johnstown–Cambria County Airport in commemoration of Boyd Wagner, the first United States Army Air Corps (USAAC) fighter ace of World War II.
