= List of surviving Republic F-105 Thunderchiefs =

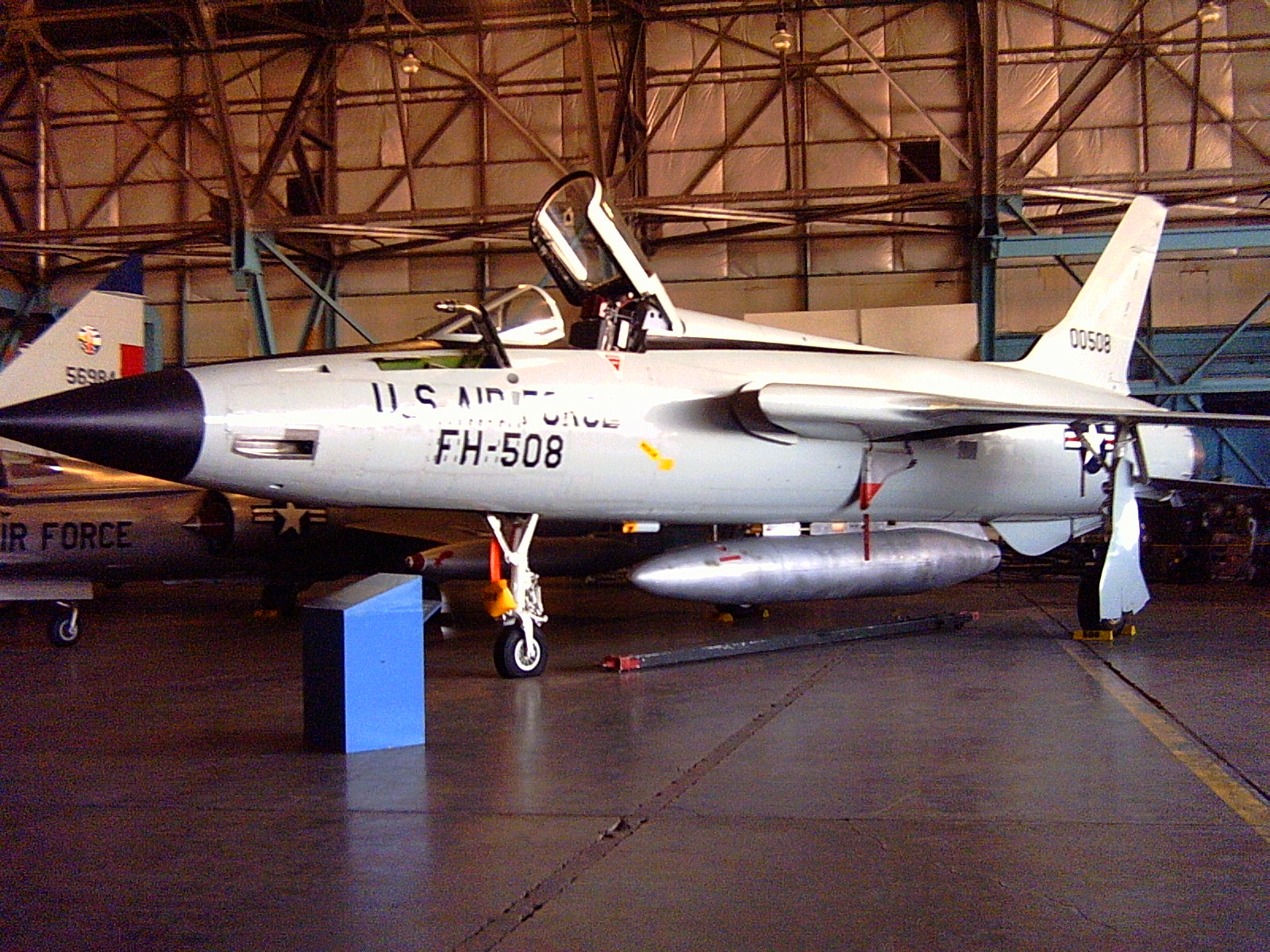
F-105D, 60-0508, at Wings Over the Rockies Museum, Denver, CO, formerly with 49th TFW (see photo details for service history)

This article lists all 105 known surviving Republic F-105 Thunderchief complete airframes in the world as of May 2021, along with their serial number, location, and any notes of significance about that airframe. In addition to the complete airframes listed below, there is a cockpit section from 63-8309 in Georgia and one from 62-4422 in Arkansas.

== Surviving aircraft ==
=== France ===
On display

F-105F

- 63-8357 – Musee de Chateau de Savigny Savigny-les-Beaune.

F-105G

- 63-8300 – Musee de l’ Air et de l’ Espace, Le Bourget, France.

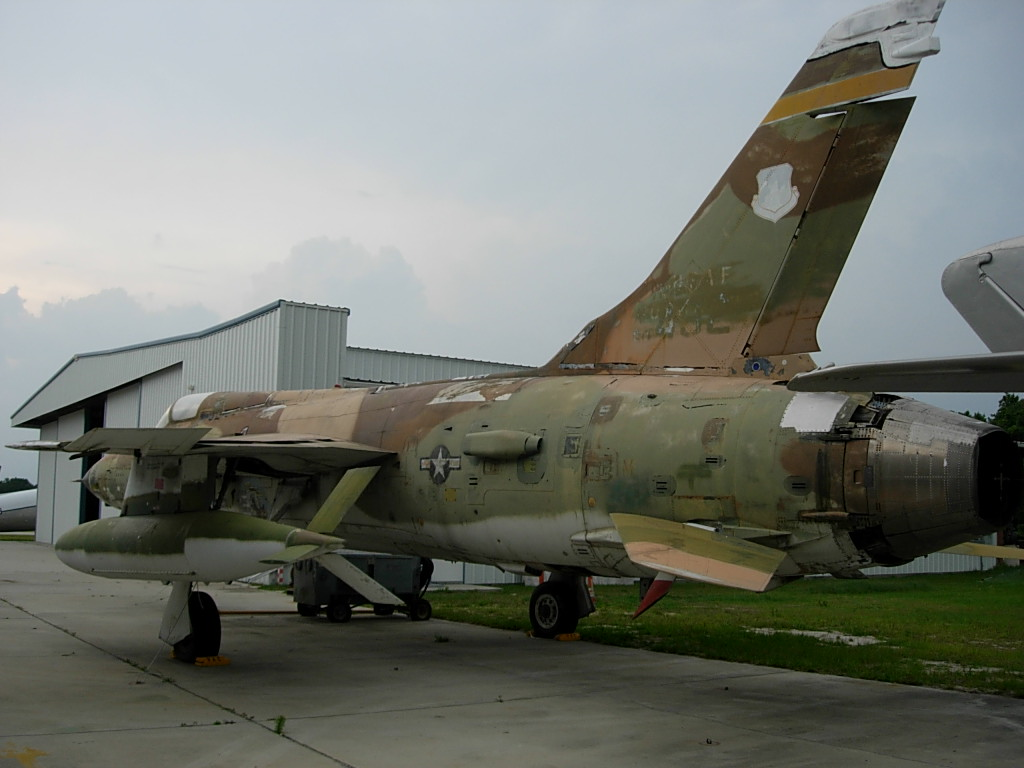
F-105D 60-0492 at the Valiant Air Command Warbird Museum

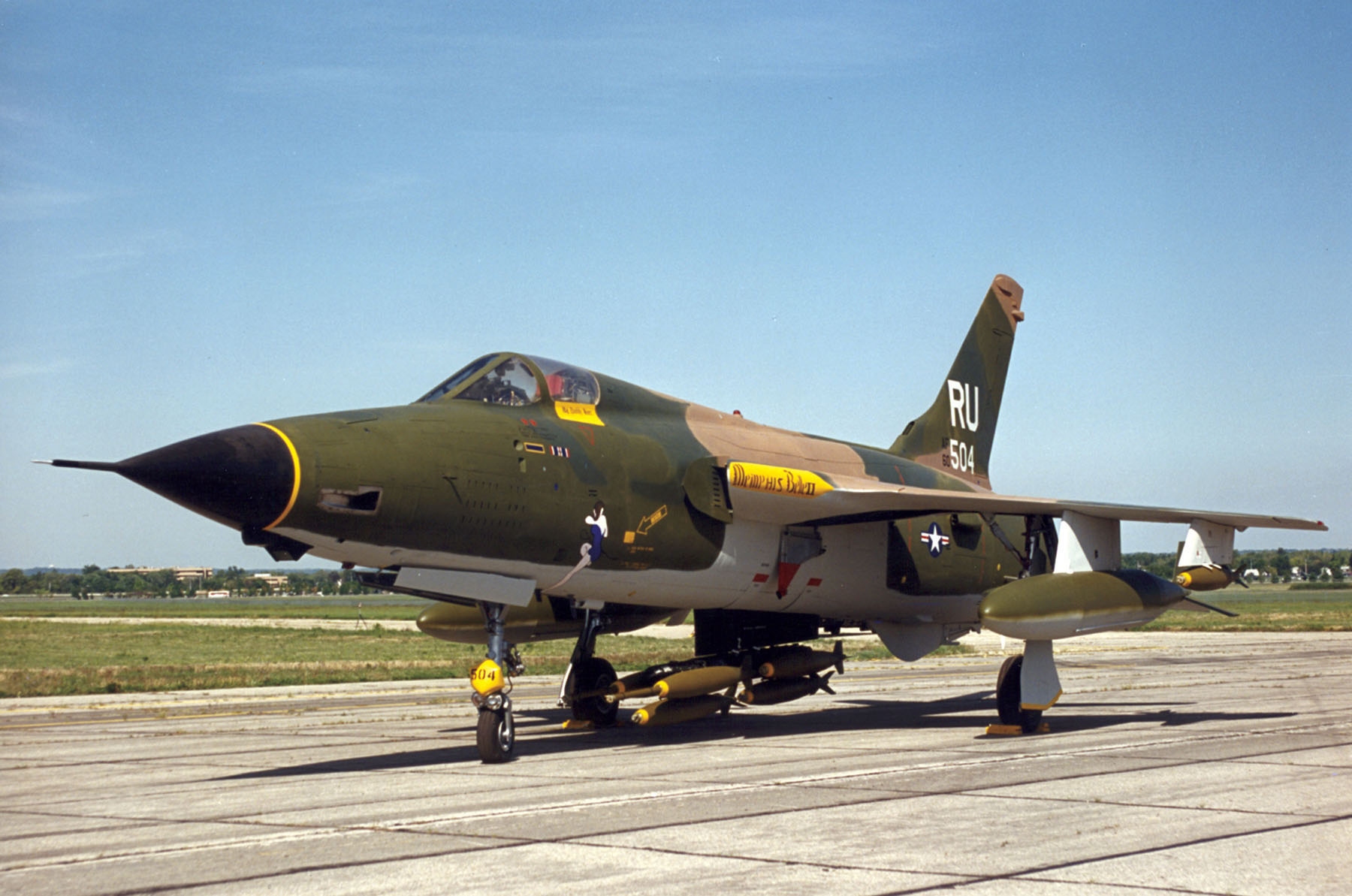
F-105D 60-0504 at National Museum of the United States Air Force

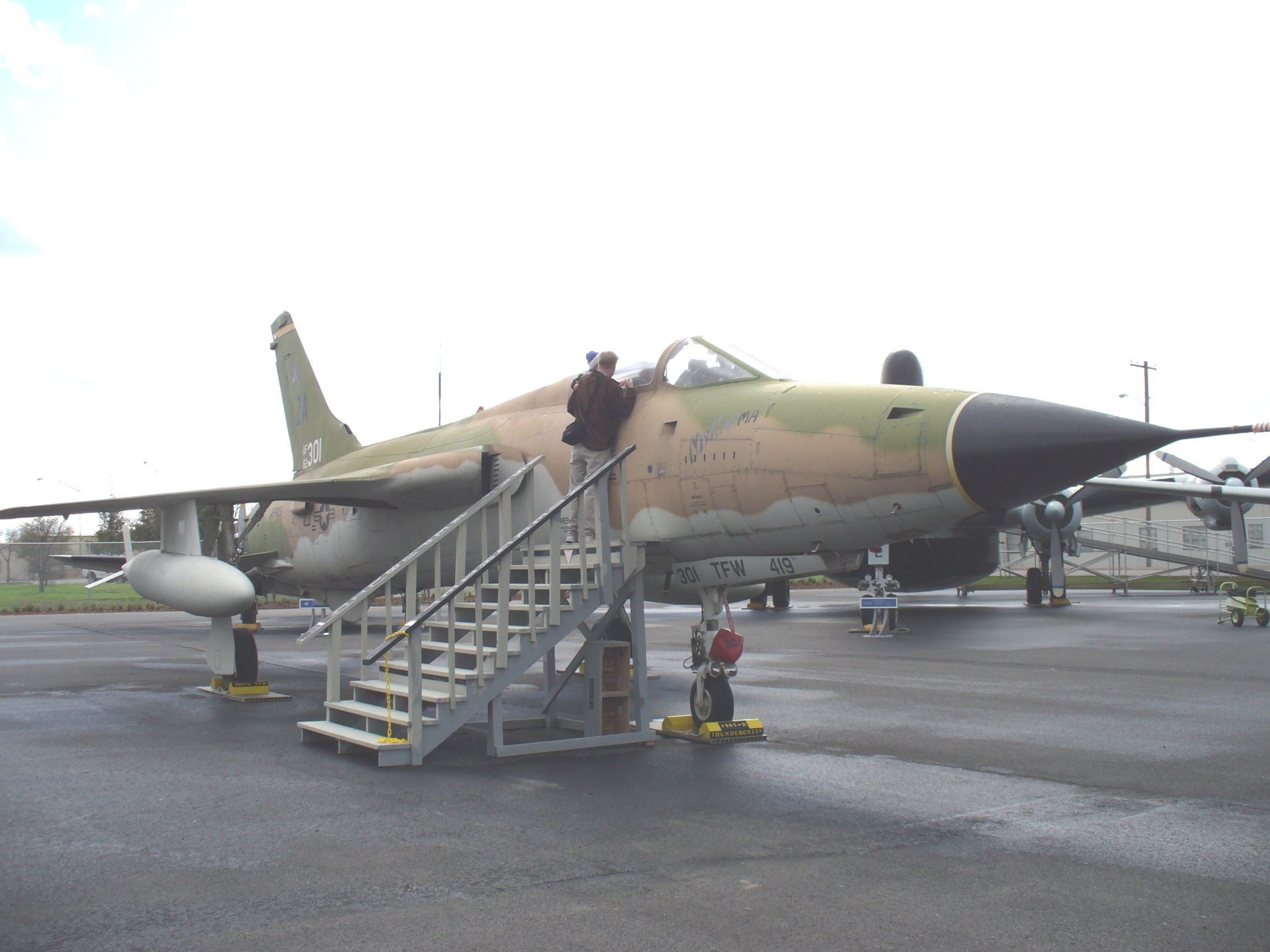
F-105D 62-4301 at the Aerospace Museum of California, McClellan Airfield (former McClellan AFB), California

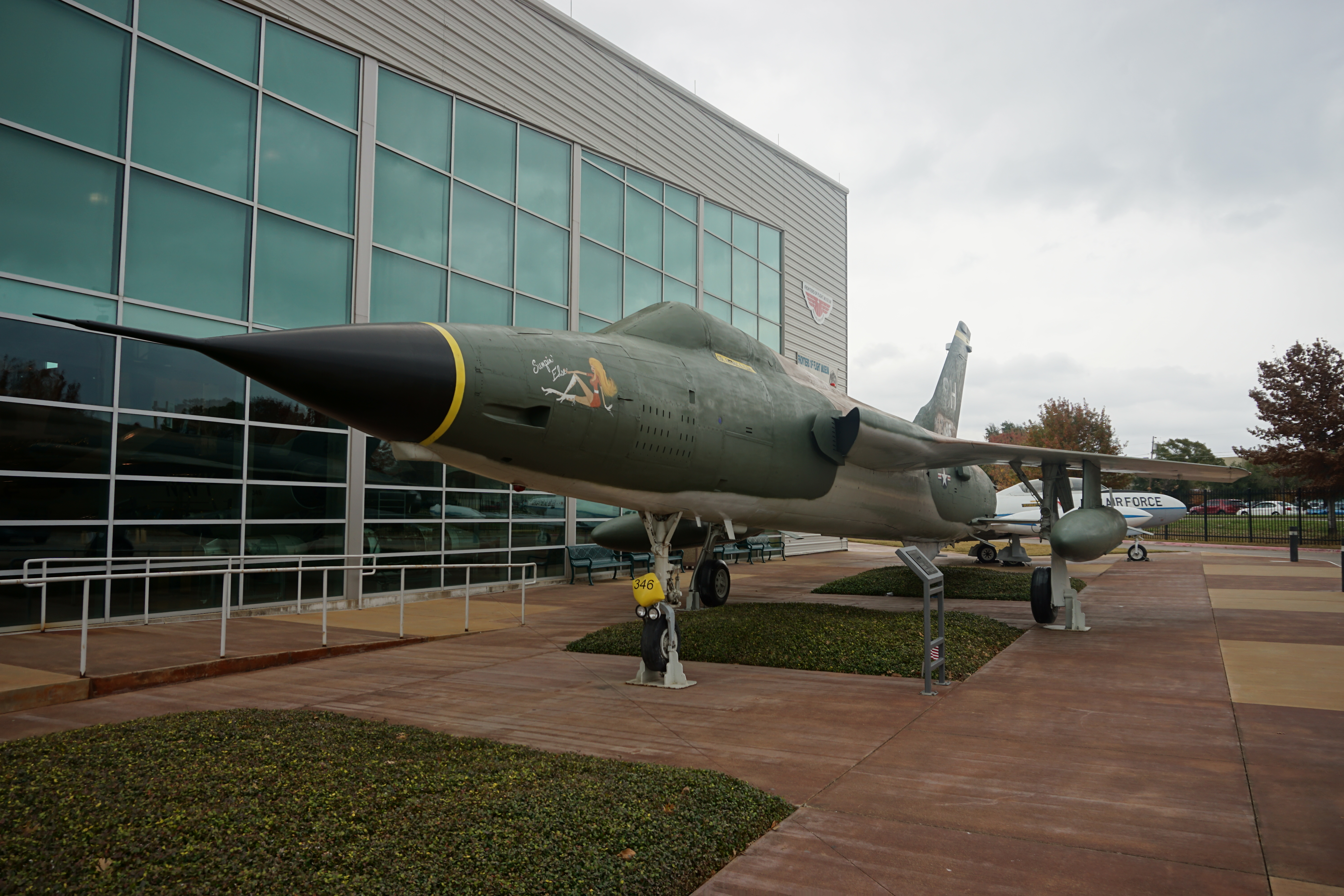
An F-105 at the Frontiers of Flight Museum

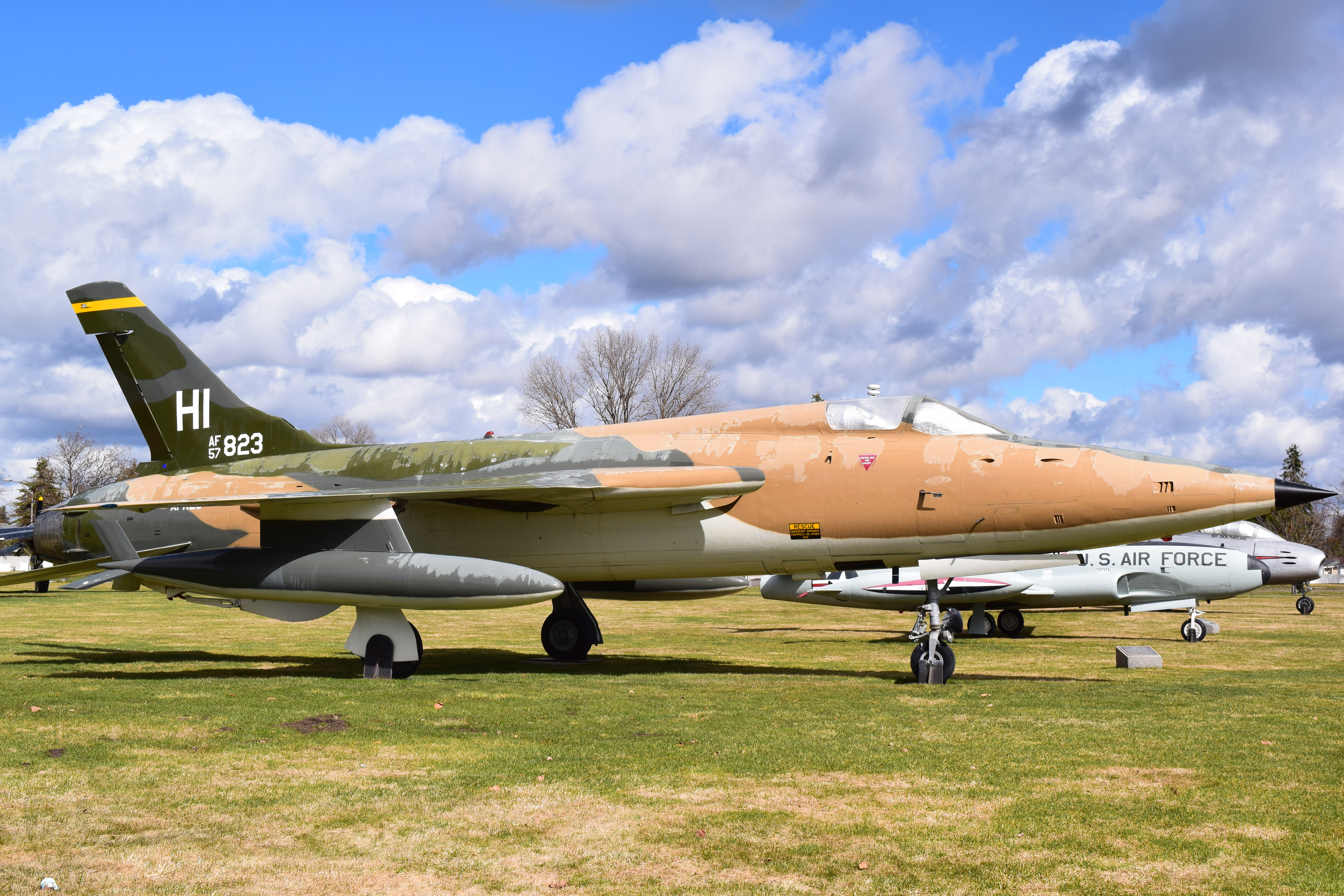
F-105B at Fairchild AFB

=== Germany ===
On display

F-105F

- 62-4417 – Flugausstellung L. + P. Junior, Abtei, Hermeskeil, Rheinland-Pfalz.

F-105G

- 62-4446 – Spangdahlem AB, Bitburg, Rhineland-Palatinate.

=== Japan ===
On display

F-105F

- 62-4418 – Gate 1 Display Area, Kadena AB, Okinawa.

=== Mexico ===
On display

F-105B

- 57-5784 – Technical Museum, Chapultepec Park, Mexico City, Mexico.

=== Poland ===
On display

F-105D

- 59-1822 – Muzeum Lotnictwa Polskiego, (Polish Aviation Museum), Kraków.

=== United States ===
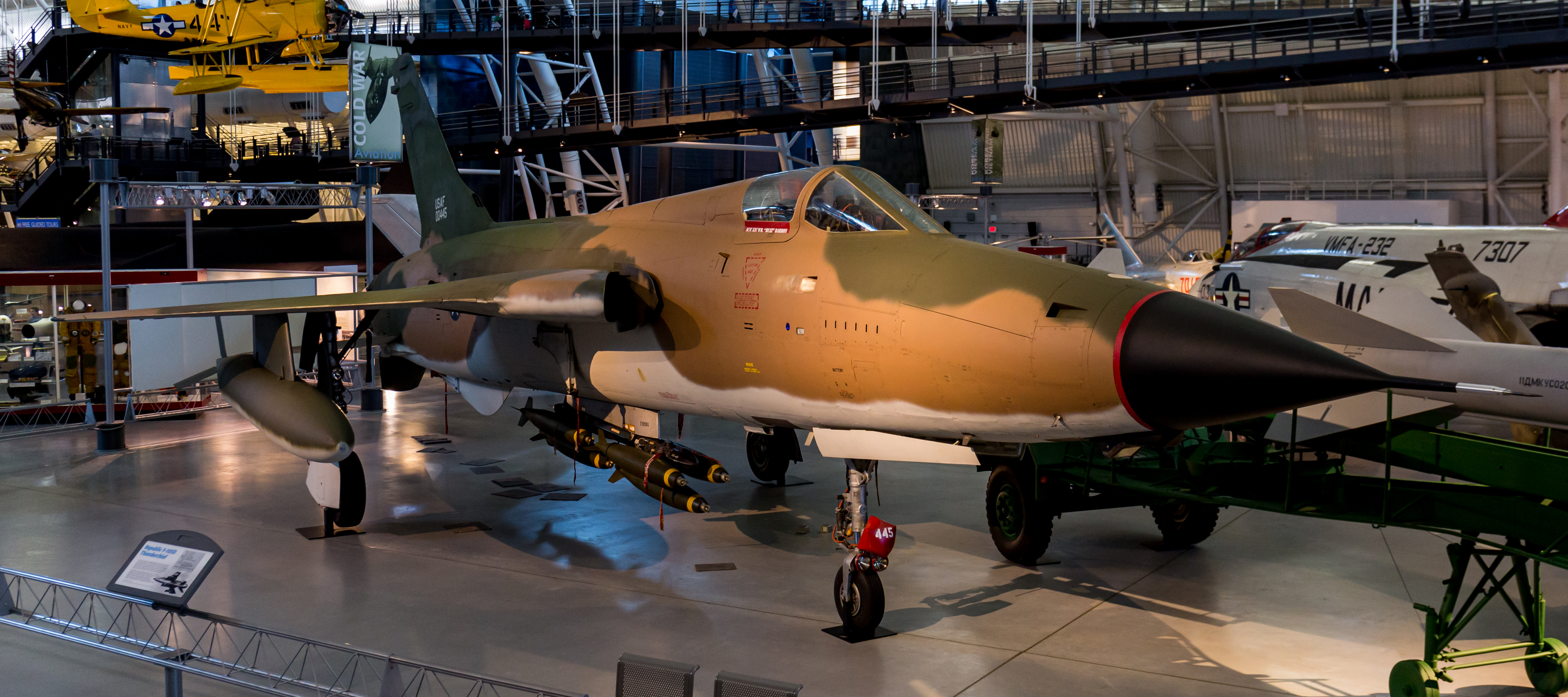
An F-105D Thunderchief on display at the Udvar-Hazy Center

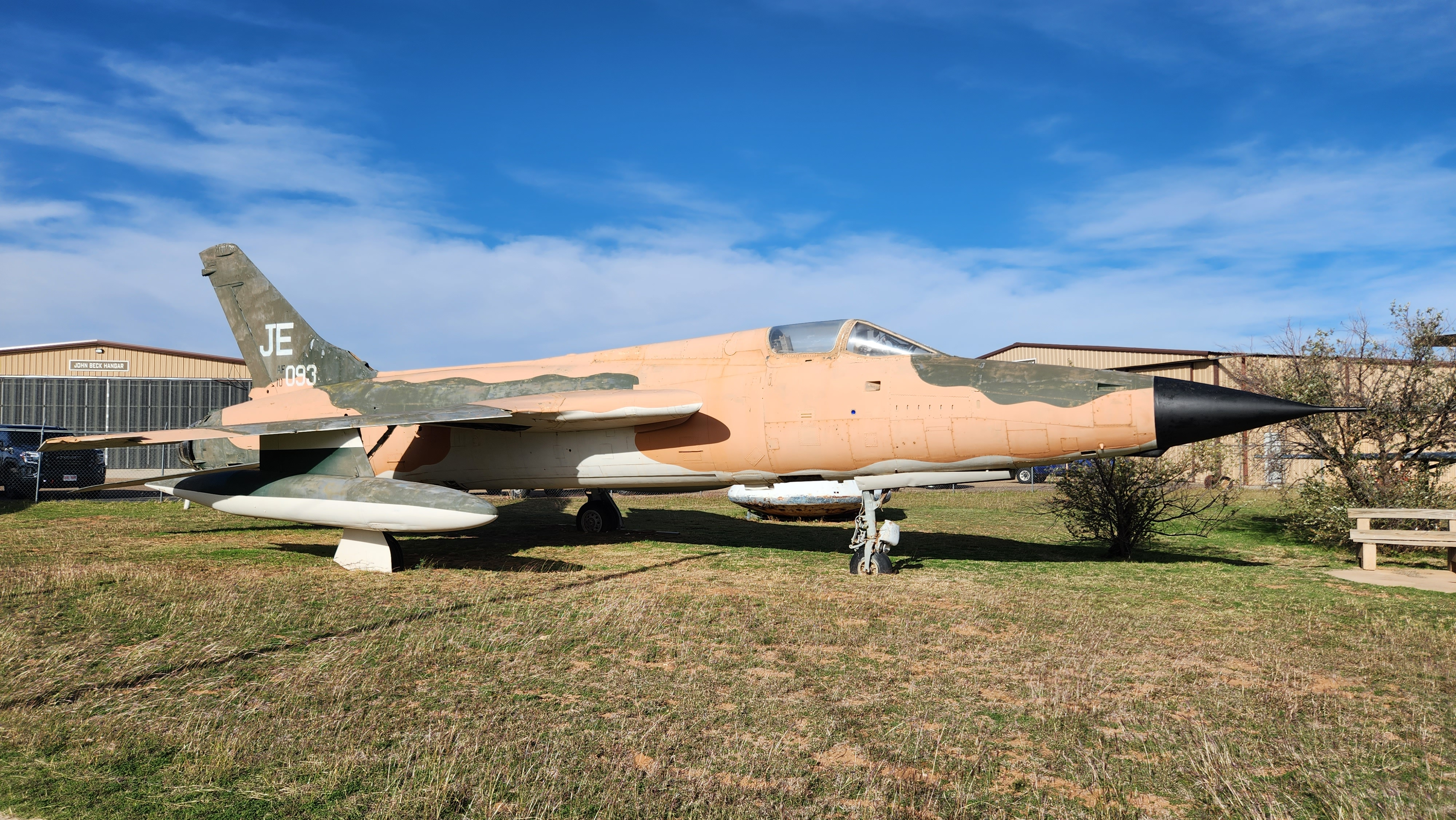
F-105 at the Texas Air Museum in Slaton, Texas.

An F-105 on display at the National Museum of Nuclear Science & History in Albuquerque, New Mexico

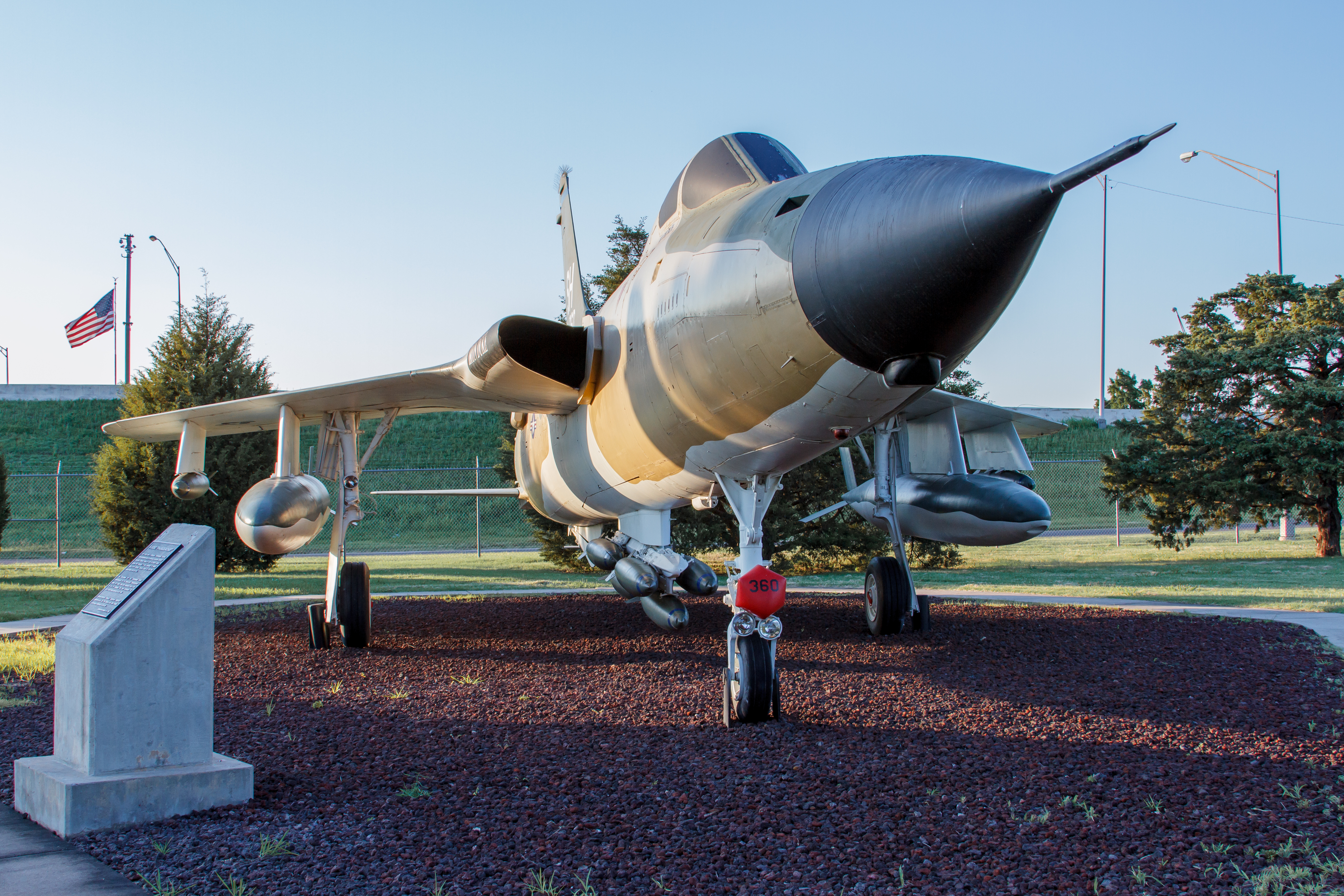
An F-105 Thunderchief on display at Tinker AFB, Oklahoma

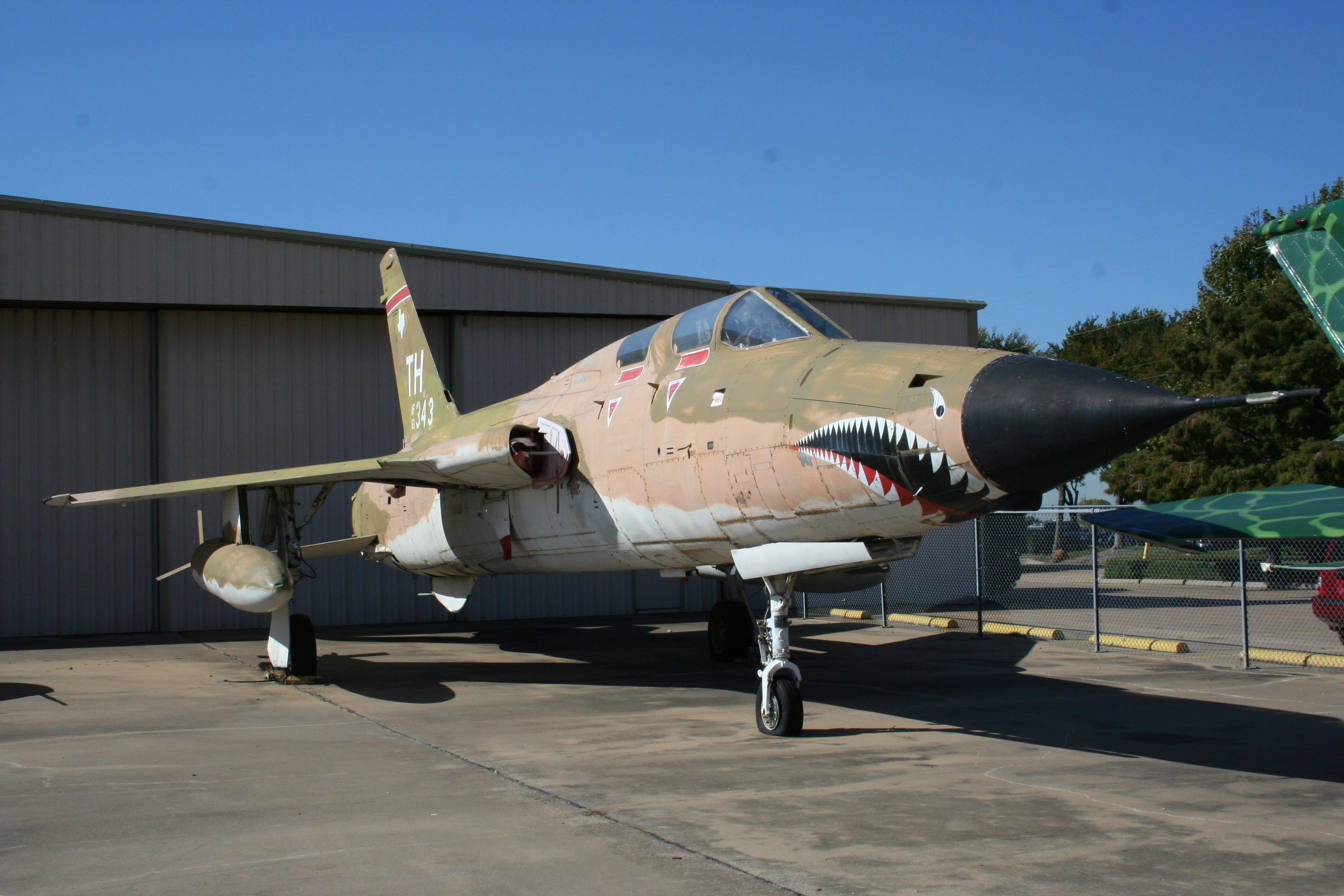
F-105F at the Cavanaugh Flight Museum

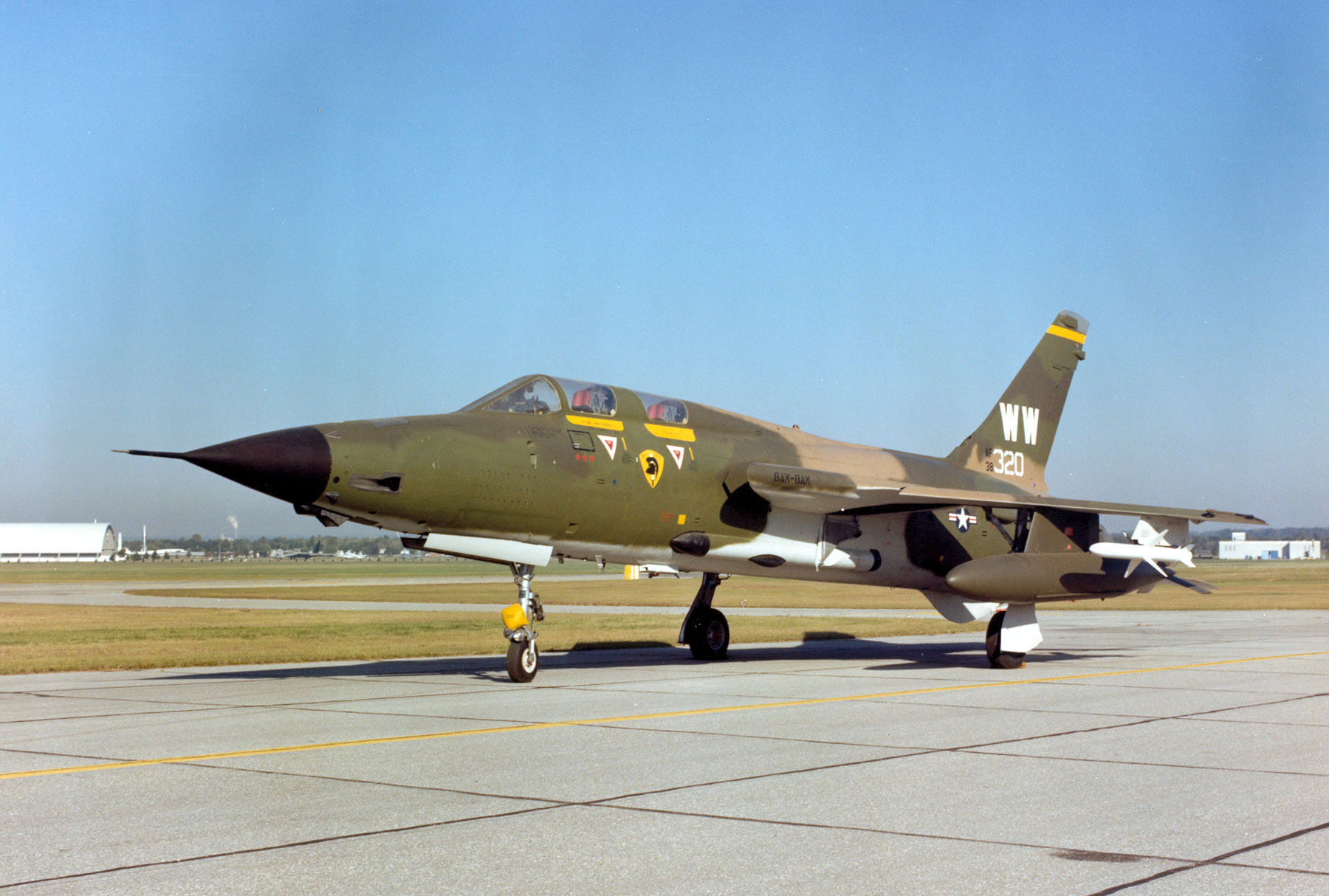
F-105G at the National Museum of the United States Air Force

On display

F-105B

- 54-0102 – USS Alabama Battleship Memorial Park, Mobile, Alabama. This airframe is a YF-105B.
- 54-0107 – Hickory Aviation Museum, Hickory, North Carolina.
- 57-5776 – New Jersey Air National Guard / 108th Air Refueling Wing cantonment area, McGuire AFB, New Jersey.
- 57-5778 – New England Air Museum, Windsor Locks, Connecticut (currently in storage).
- 57-5783 – Cradle of Aviation Museum, Garden City, New York.
- 57-5789 – Winston Field, Snyder, Texas.
- 57-5792 – Zanesville Municipal Airport, Zanesville, Ohio.
- 57-5803 – March Field Air Museum, March ARB (former March AFB), Riverside, California.
- 57-5817 – Chillicothe Municipal Airport, Chillicothe, Missouri.
- 57-5819 – Poinsett Air Force Range (GSU of 20th Fighter Wing at Shaw AFB), South Carolina.
- 57-5820 – MAPS Air Museum in Akron, Ohio.
- 57-5823 – Fairchild AFB, Spokane, Washington.
- 57-5837 – Castle Air Museum, former Castle AFB, Atwater, California.
- 57-5838 – Wisconsin ANG - Volk Field Air National Guard Base, Wisconsin.
- 57-5839 – South Dakota Air and Space Museum, Ellsworth AFB, South Dakota.

JF-105B

- 54-0105 – USAF Airman Heritage Museum, Lackland AFB, San Antonio, Texas.

F-105D

- 58-1155 – Displayed as AF Ser. No. 59-1771 Air Force Armament Museum, Eglin AFB, Florida.
- 59-1738 – Dyess Linear Air Park, Dyess AFB, Texas.
- 59-1739 – Commemorative Air Force, Midland, Texas.
- 59-1743 – Hill Aerospace Museum, Hill AFB, Utah.
- 59-1759 – under restoration at Yanks Air Museum in Chino, California.
- 59-1771 – American Veterans (AMVETS) Post 2256, Circleville, Ohio.
- 60-0445 – Steven F. Udvar-Hazy Center of the Smithsonian National Air and Space Museum in Chantilly, Virginia.
- 60-0452 – Private collection of Dan Bissell at Bissell Auto & Body, St. Louis, MO. Note: Not open to the public.
- 60-0455 – Veteran's Memorial Park, Dixon, Illinois. (Moved from Jackson, Mississippi in 2009 and restored to Vietnam era camouflage markings.)
- 60-0471 – under restoration at Yanks Air Museum in Chino, California.
- 60-0482 – USAF Academy, Colorado.
- 60-0492 – Valiant Air Command Warbird Museum, Space Coast Regional Airport, Titusville, Florida.
- 60-0500 – Historic Aviation Memorial Museum, Tyler, Texas.
- 60-0504 – National Museum of the United States Air Force, Wright-Patterson AFB, Dayton, Ohio.
- 60-0508 – Wings Over the Rockies Air and Space Museum, former Lowry AFB, Denver, Colorado.
- 60-0535 – Keesler AFB Air Park, Mississippi.
- 60-5385 – Fort Worth Aviation Museum, Fort Worth, Texas
- 61-0041 – District of Columbia Air National Guard - 113th Wing complex, Andrews AFB, Maryland.
- 61-0056 – Seymour Johnson AFB, Goldsboro, North Carolina.
- 61-0069 – Mounted on a pedestal along Interstate 80 as part of the Strategic Air Command & Aerospace Museum's collection near Ashland, Nebraska. This aircraft is credited with downing a MiG-17 during the Vietnam war in 1967.
- 61-0073 – Air Power Park, Hampton, Virginia.
- 61-0086 – Pima Air & Space Museum, adjacent to Davis-Monthan AFB, Tucson, Arizona.
- 61-0088 – Grissom Air Museum, Grissom ARB (former Grissom AFB), Indiana.
- 61-0093 – Texas Air Museum - Caprock Chapter, City of Slaton/Larry T. Neal Memorial Airport, Slaton, Texas.
- 61-0099 – Air Classics Museum of Aviation, Sugar Grove, Illinois.
- 61-0100 – NAS Fort Worth JRB/Carswell Field (former Carswell AFB), Fort Worth, TX.
- 61-0106 – Museum of the Kansas National Guard, Topeka, Kansas.
- 61-0107 – National Museum of Nuclear Science & History, adjacent to Kirtland AFB, Albuquerque, New Mexico.
- 61-0108 – Palm Springs Air Museum in Palm Springs, California.
- 61-0110 – This airframe has the T-Stick II modification. Hobbs Army Airfield in Hobbs, NM. (Relocated in 2021 from Eastern New Mexico University - Roswell, Roswell Industrial Air Center, Roswell, New Mexico.)
- 61-0115 – Helton Howland Memorial Park, Tallapoosa, Georgia.
- 61-0138 – Bolling AFB, Washington, District of Columbia. Displayed as 59-1771.
- 61-0145 – Holloman AFB, New Mexico.
- 61-0146 – Century Circle at Edwards Air Force Base, near Rosamond, California.
- 61-0159 – Davis-Monthan AFB, Arizona.
- 61-0164 – Hunter Memorial Park, Douglasville, Georgia. Note: Painted to represent aircraft 59-1746.
- 61-0165 – Moody AFB, Georgia.
- 61-0175 – Sheppard AFB Air Park, Sheppard AFB, Texas.
- 61-0176 – Maxwell AFB Air Park, Maxwell AFB, Alabama.
- 61-0188 – Tactical Air Command Memorial Park, Joint Base Langley-Eustis, Hampton, Virginia; displayed as AF Ser. No 61-0217 in the TAC Memorial Park, but in a 1990s/2000s USAF all gray tactical paint scheme with subdued insignia.
- 61-0199 – Veteran's Park, Tupelo, Mississippi.
- 62-4228 – Helton Howland Memorial Park, Tallapoosa, Georgia.
- 62-4242 – Vance AFB, Oklahoma.
- 62-4253 – Reflections of Freedom Historical Air Park, Wichita, Kansas.
- 62-4259 – Museum of Aviation, Robins AFB, Warner Robins, Georgia.
- 62-4279 – JBSA-Kelly Field Annex, San Antonio, Texas.
- 62-4299 – Veterans Memorial Museum, Chehalis, Washington.
- 62-4301 – Aerospace Museum of California McClellan AFB), Sacramento, California.
- 62-4318 – Fairview Park, Centralia, Illinois.
- 62-4328 – Arnold Air Force Base, Tennessee.
- 62-4346 – Frontiers of Flight Museum in Dallas, Texas.
- 62-4347 – Hill AFB, Utah.
- 62-4353 – Freedom Museum, Pampa, Texas.
- 62-4360 – Tinker AFB, Oklahoma.
- 62-4361 – American Airpower Museum, Republic Airport, Suffolk County, New York
- 62-4375 – Combat Air Museum in Topeka, Kansas.
- 62-4383 – March Field Air Museum, March ARB (former March AFB), Riverside, California.
- 62-4387 – USAF Airman Heritage Museum, Lackland AFB, San Antonio, Texas.

F-105F

- 63-8261 – Jacksonville Museum of Military History, Little Rock AFB, Little Rock, Arkansas.
- 63-8276 – Nellis AFB, Las Vegas, Nevada.
- 63-8331 – Pacific Coast Air Museum, Santa Rosa, California.
- 63-8343 – Cavanaugh Flight Museum, Addison, Texas. Removed from public display when the museum indefinitely closed on 1 January 2024.
- 63-8365 – Southern Museum of Flight, Birmingham, Alabama.
- 63-8366 – McConnell AFB, Kansas.

F-105G

- 62-4416 – Joe Davies Heritage Airpark at Palmdale Plant 42, Palmdale, California.
- 62-4425 – American Legion Post 325 in Blissfield, Michigan.
- 62-4427 – Pima Air & Space Museum, adjacent to Davis-Monthan AFB, Tucson, Arizona.
- 62-4432 – Evergreen Aviation & Space Museum, McMinnville, Oregon.
- 62-4438 – Pearl Harbor Aviation Museum, Ford Island, Hawaii
- 62-4440 – Hill Aerospace Museum, Hill AFB, Utah.
- 62-4444 – Empire State Aerosciences Museum, Glenville, New York.
- 63-8266 – Mid-America Air Museum, Liberal, Kansas.
- 63-8274 – Glenn L. Martin Maryland Aviation Museum at Martin State Airport in Middle River, Maryland.
- 63-8276 – Nellis AFB, Nevada.
- 63-8278 – Sacramento VA Medical Center, Mather Airport (formerly Mather AFB), Sacramento, California.
- 63-8285 – Davis-Monthan AFB, Arizona.
- 63-8296 – Flying Tiger Heritage Park, Alexandria International Airport (former England AFB), Alexandria, Louisiana.
- 63-8306 – Aviation Cadet Museum, Silver Wings Field, Eureka Springs, Arkansas.
- 63-8320 – National Museum of the United States Air Force, Wright-Patterson AFB, Dayton, Ohio.
- 63-8336 – American Heritage Museum, Hudson, Massachusetts.
- 63-8345 – Dobbins ARB (former Dobbins AFB), Marietta, Georgia.
- 63-8363 – Texas Air Museum, Stinson Field Chapter, San Antonio, Texas.

== See also ==
- Republic F-105 Thunderchief
- List of F-105 Units of the United States Air Force
