= List of displayed Bell UH-1 Iroquois =

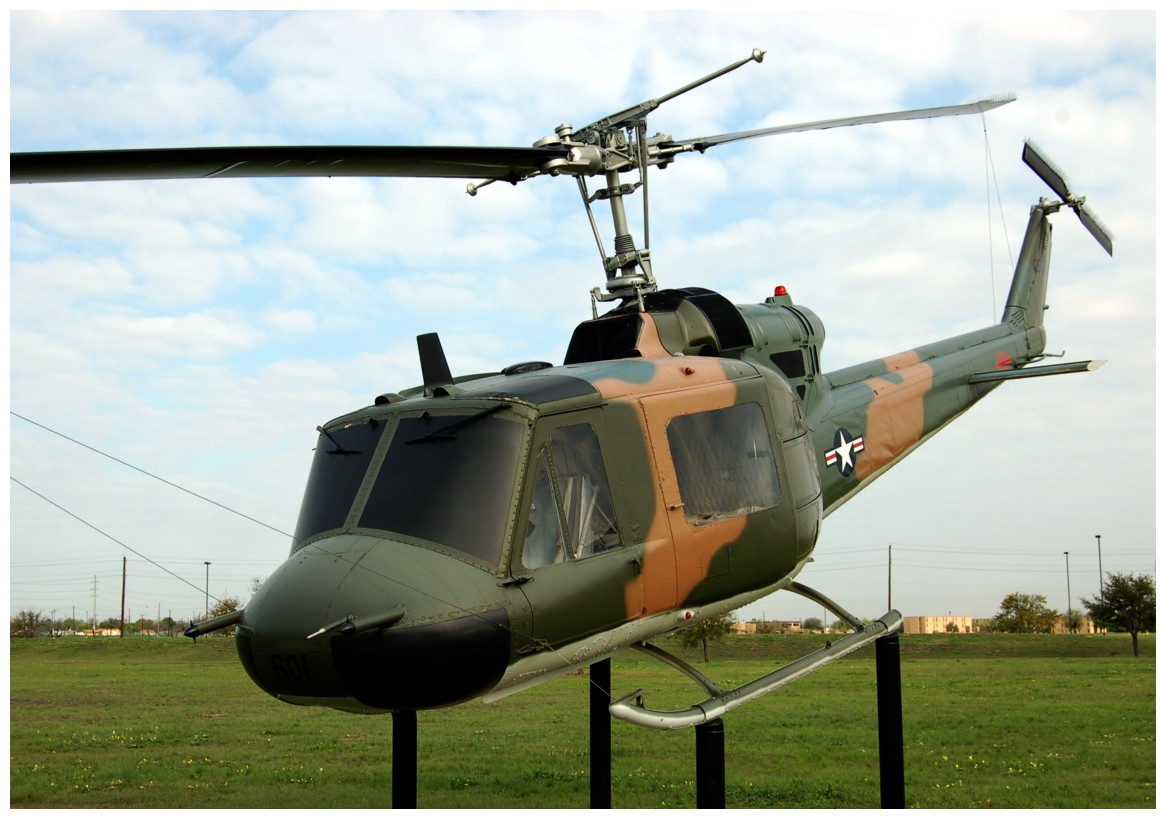
UH-1B serial number 60-3601 on display at Lackland Air Force Base, Texas

This is an incomplete list of displayed Bell UH-1 Iroquois helicopters. The Bell UH-1 Iroquois experienced a production number in the thousands (both short and long-frame types), and many are in service in nations around the world. A large number of decommissioned and retired aircraft exist as gate guardians at various military bases, in aviation museums, and other static-display sites.

A large portion of the UH-1s on display in the United States went to individual chapters of three veterans organizations: the Veterans of Foreign Wars, the American Legion, and Vietnam Veterans of America.

== Aircraft on display ==
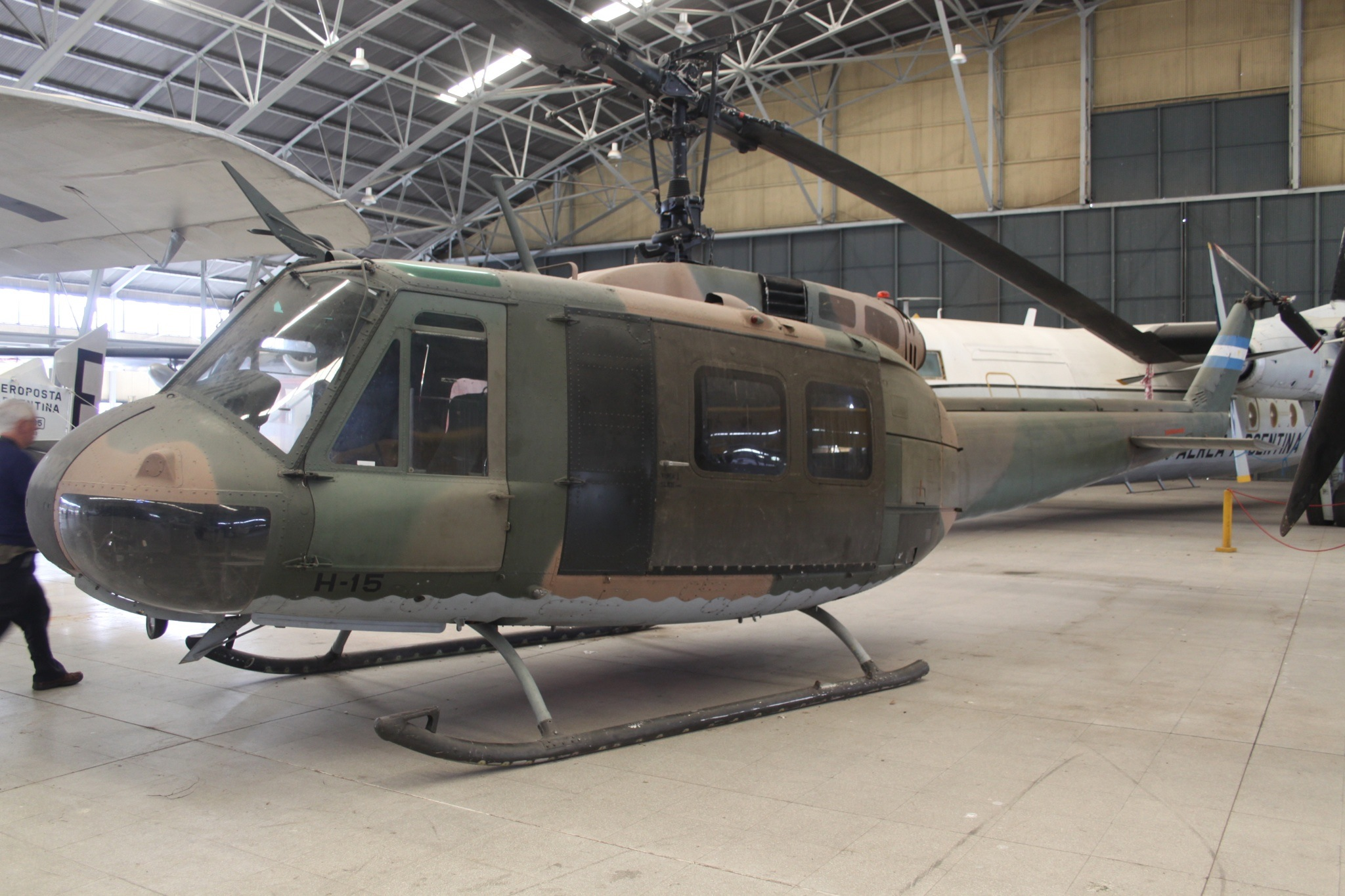
Bell 205 (UH-1) H-15, Museo Nacional de Aeronáutica, Argentina, 2012

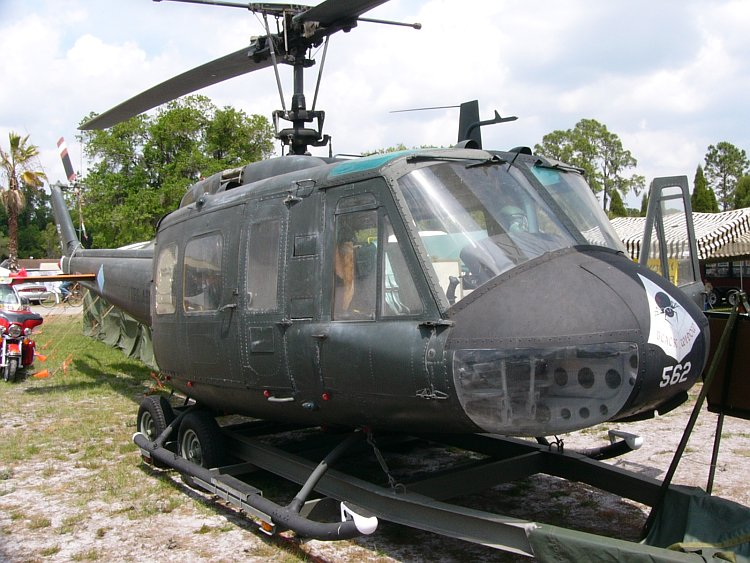
A UH-1H on display at Sun 'n Fun 2006. The aircraft is owned by a Vietnam War veterans' association.

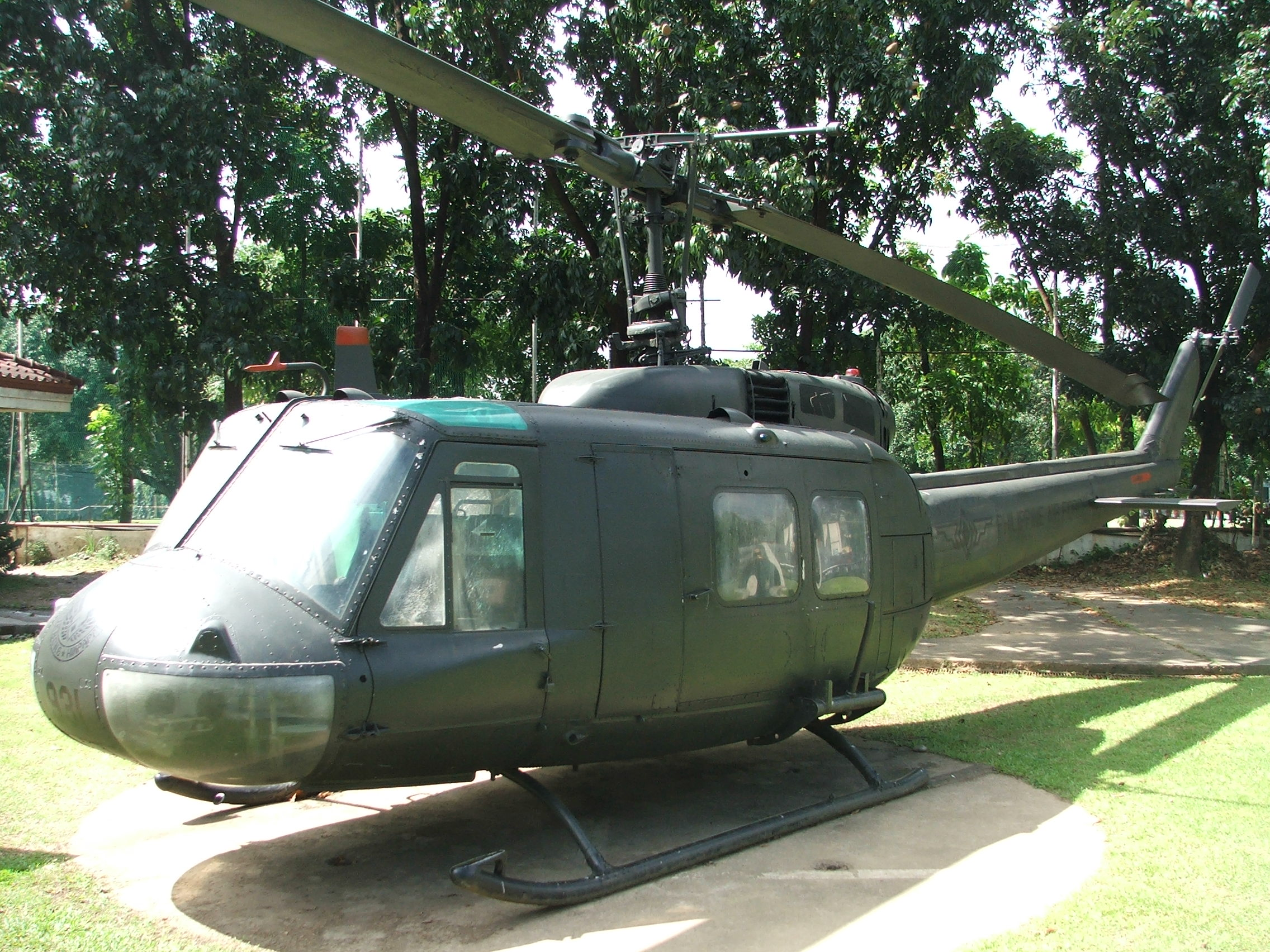
A Philippine Air Force UH-1 on display at the Armed Forces of the Museum in Camp Aguinaldo

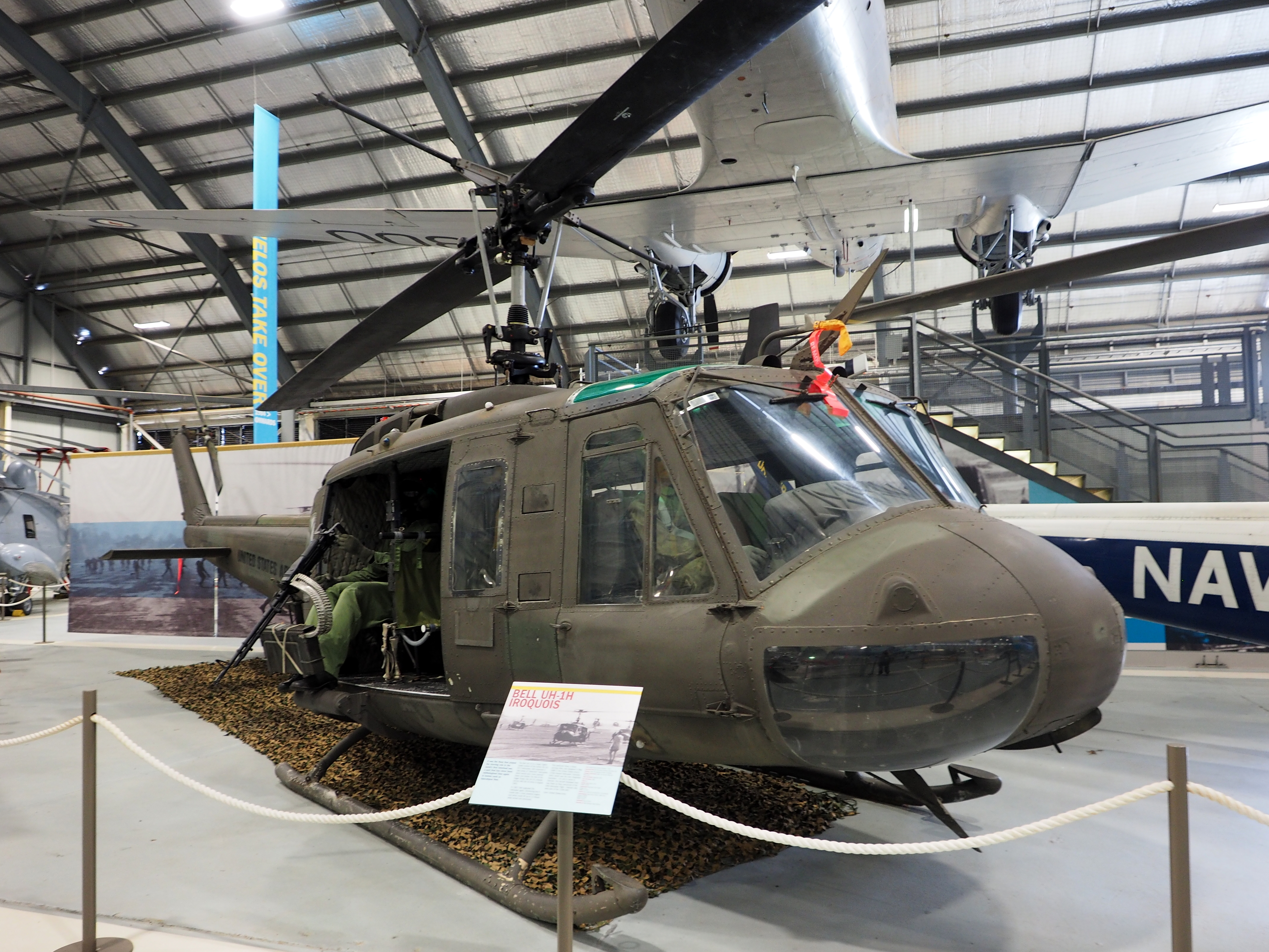
A UH-1H on display at the Royal Australian Navy Fleet Air Arm Museum

=== Argentina ===
UH-1H

- H-15 of the Argentine Air Force, at the Museo Nacional de Aeronáutica, Morón, Buenos Aires
- 3-H-305 of the Argentine Naval Aviation, at the Naval Aviation Museum, Bahía Blanca, Buenos Aires

=== Australia ===
UH-1B

- 62-04606/A2-384 – RAAF Museum in Point Cook, Victoria
- 63-12954/N9-882 – Royal Australian Navy Fleet Air Arm Museum
- 63-13587/A2-1019 – Vietnam Gallery at the Australian War Memorial
- 63-13588/A2-1020 – RAAF Museum in Point Cook, Victoria
- 64-17622/N9-3102 – Nowra, New South Wales

UH-1H

- 66-16290 – Royal Australian Navy Fleet Air Arm Museum
- 67-17573/A2-771 – RAAF Amberley Aviation Heritage Centre in Amberley, Queensland
- 68-16451/A2-110 – National Vietnam Veterans Museum on Phillip Island, Victoria
- 69-15484/A2-484 – Caboolture Warplane Museum in Caboolture, Queensland
- 72-21579/A2-278 - Vietnam Veterans Commemorative Walk in Seymour, Victoria
- 72-21597/A2-296 – Aviation Heritage Museum in Bull Creek, Western Australia
- 72-21611/A2-310 – Queensland Air Museum in Caloundra, Queensland
- 72-21631 – Woolgoolga, New South Wales. Painted as A2-767.

UH-1V

- 73-21763 – Dandenong RSL, in Dandenong, Victoria donated by the US Government in September 2003. Painted as A2-767.

=== Canada ===
UH-1H (CH-118)

- 118101 – National Air Force Museum of Canada, CFB Trenton, Ontario
- 118106 - Musée de la Défense aérienne, Bagotville, Quebec

=== China ===
UH-1H

- During the Sino-Vietnam border conflict, a Vietnamese officer, who opposed the Vietnamese government's anti-China policy, stole a UH-1H (the only UH-1 captured by the Vietnamese during the Vietnam War), evaded interception from multiple MiG-21s and successfully landed in China. Afterwards, the helicopter was given to the People's Liberation Army for test and evaluation. Later it was transferred to the museum of Nanjing University of Aeronautics & Astronautics.

=== Germany ===
UH-1D

- Bundesgrenzschutz D-HATE (c/n 8063) - Luftwaffenmuseum der Bundeswehr, Berlin-Gatow
- Bundesgrenzschutz D-HATU ex 70+36 (c/n 8066) - Deutsches Museum Flugwerft Schleissheim, Oberschleissheim
- German SAR (c/n 8105) – Dornier Museum Friedrichshafen, Friedrichshafen
- 73+08, the last UH-1D of the German Army Aviation Corps with special livery "Goodbye Huey" - Hubschraubermuseum Bückeburg, Bückeburg

=== Israel ===
UH-1H

- 62-12362 (c/n 4020), civil registration N1236P – Israeli Air Force Museum, Hatzerim AFB, Beersheba

=== New Zealand ===
UH-1H

- 69-15923 – Royal New Zealand Air Force Museum, Christchurch

=== Norway ===
UH-1B

- Norwegian Aviation Museum in Bodø
- Norwegian Armed Forces Aircraft Collection

=== Philippines ===
UH-1H

- 69-12293 – Colonel Jesus Villamor Air Base, Pasay City
- 8911 – Clark Air Base, Angeles City
- 13992 – Colonel Ernesto Rabina Air Base Capas, Tarlac
- 67-9973 –Cesar Basa Air Base, Floridablanca, Pampanga
- 16328 8522 – Museo Pambata, City of Manila
- 73-13418 – Basilio Fernando Air Base Lipa, Batangas
- 65-4614 – Danilo Atienza Air Base Cavite City, Cavite.
- 12503 – Camp Aguinaldo Quezon City, Philippines
- 13938 – Air Power Park, Philippine Military Academy, Baguio City, Philippines
- 806 – Passi City Eco-Park, Iloilo.
- 16125 - Mactan–Benito Ebuen Air Base
- 6002 - Camp Servillano Aquino Tarlac.

=== United Kingdom ===
UH-1H

- 66-16579 – The Helicopter Museum, Weston super Mare
- 72-21605 – American Air Force Hangar of the Imperial War Museum, Duxford
- 72-21506 – Museum of Army Flying, Middle Wallop. Former AE-409 of the Argentine Army Aviation, captured in the Falklands War.
- 74-22520 – Fleet Air Arm Museum, Yeovil. Former AE-422 of the Argentine Army Aviation, captured in the Falklands War.

==== British Overseas Territories ====
UH-1H

- 72-21521 – RAF Mount Pleasant, Falkland Islands. Former AE-410 of the Argentine Army Aviation, captured in the Falklands War.

=== United States ===
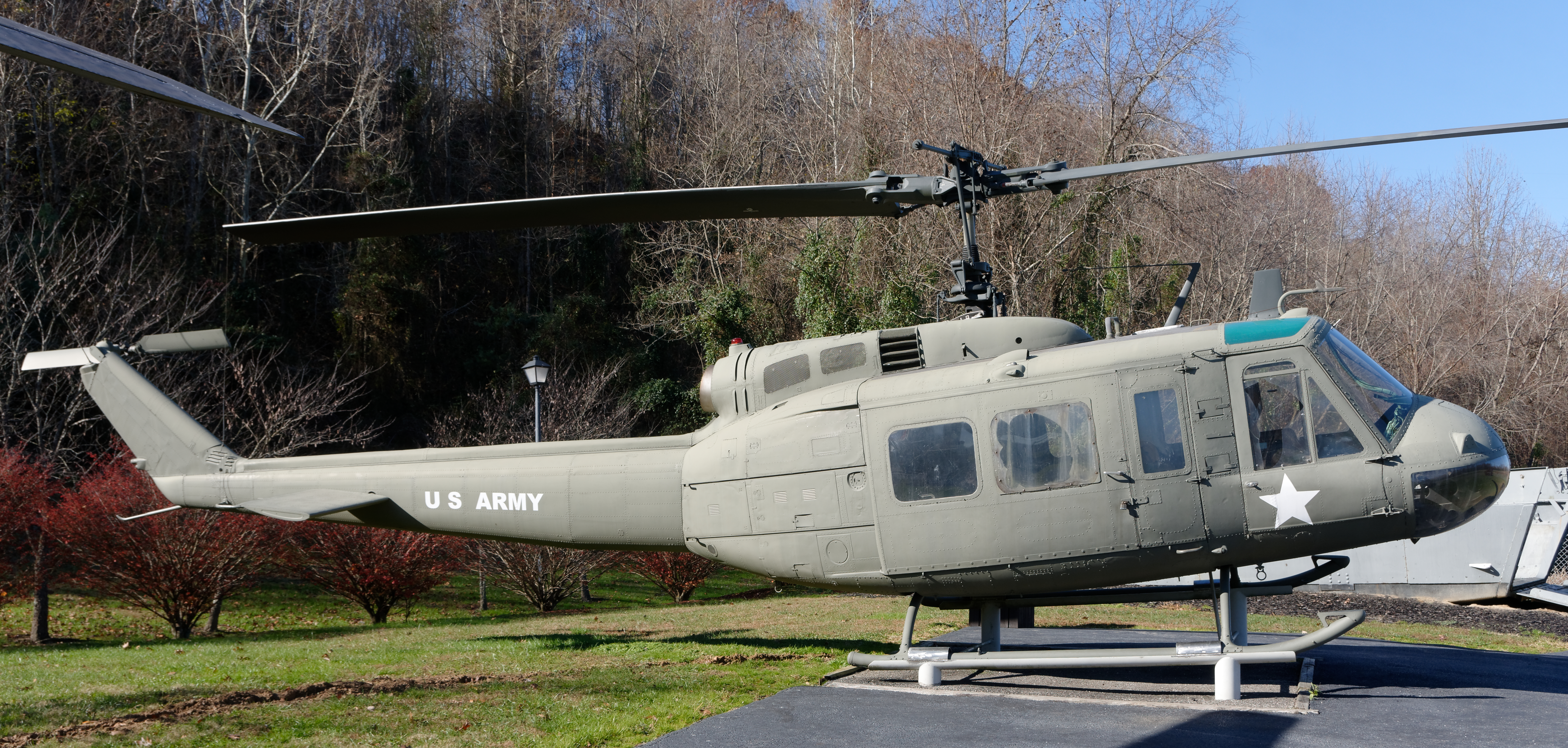
UH-1 on display at the Greenup County War Memorial

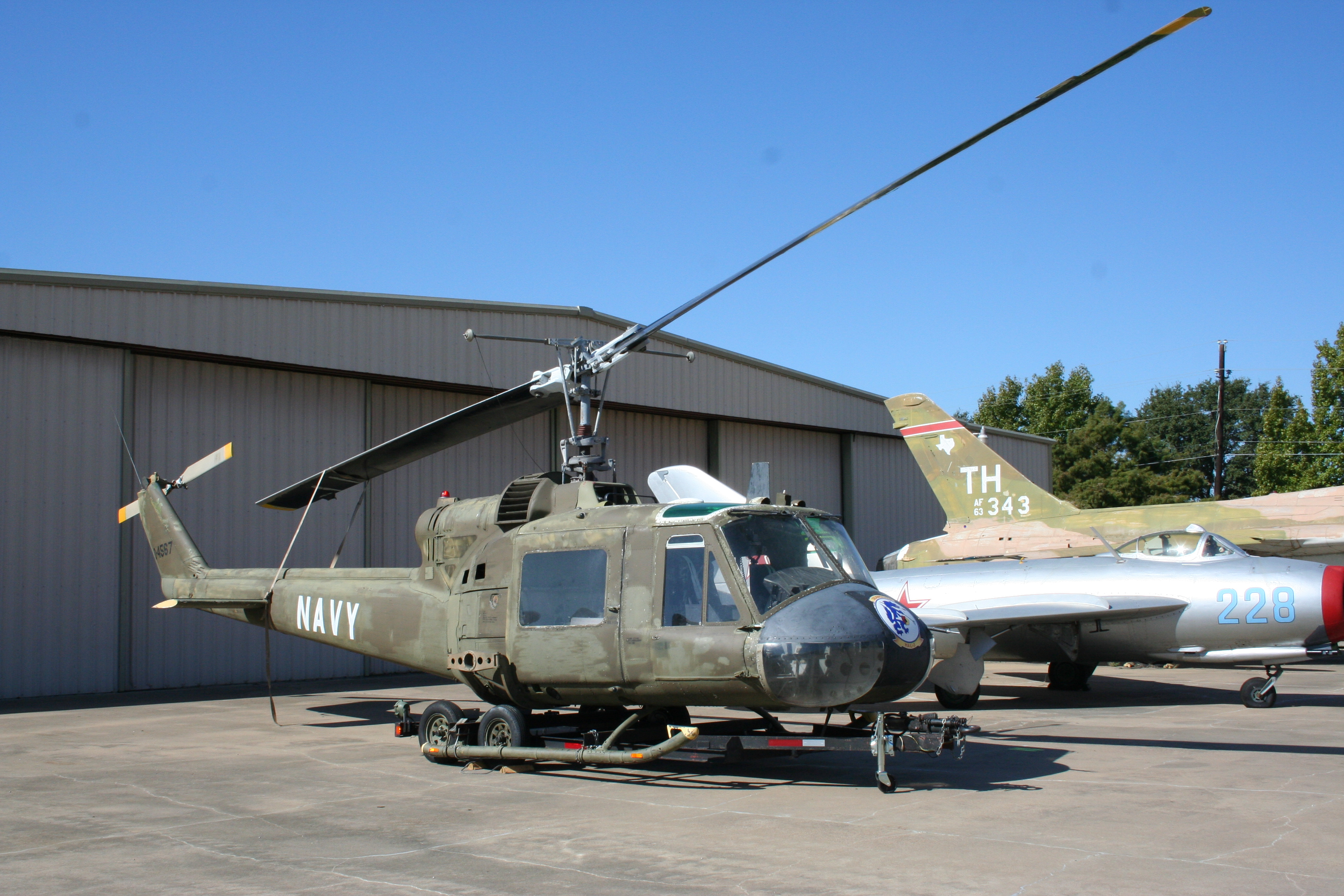
UH-1B on display at the Cavanaugh Flight Museum

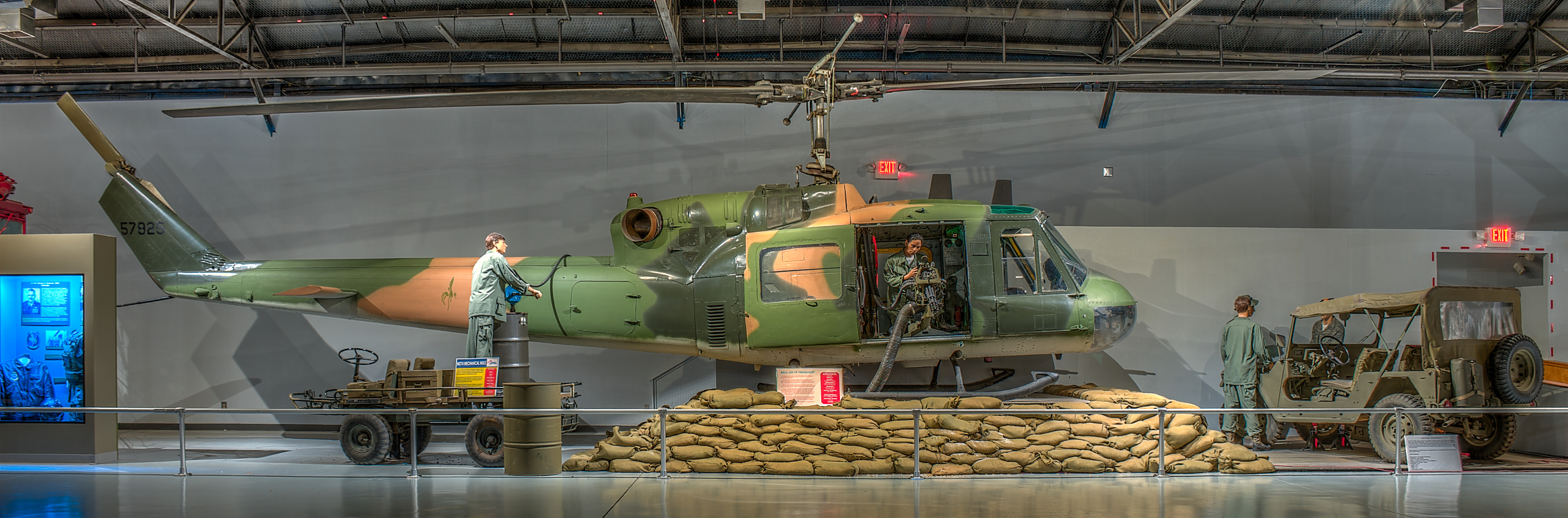
UH-1P display at the Museum of Aviation, Robins AFB

UH-1A

- 58-02091 – Fort Campbell in Clarksville, Tennessee
- 59-01711 – 82nd Airborne Division War Memorial Museum at Fort Bragg, North Carolina
- 59-01621 – Intrepid Sea-Air-Space Museum in New York City

UH-1B

- 60-3614 – USS Midway Museum in San Diego, California
- 62-12550 – New England Air Museum located adjacent to Bradley International Airport in Windsor Locks, Connecticut
- 61-686 – Discovery Park of America, Union City, Tennessee. Formerly on display at Octave Chanute Aerospace Museum, Rantoul, Illinois.
- 62-02010 – Don F. Pratt Memorial Museum at Fort Campbell in Clarksville, Tennessee
- 62-02084 – Palm Springs Air Museum in Palm Springs, California
- 62-12537 – March Field Air Museum in Riverside, California
- 63-8733 – EAA Air Museum in Oshkosh WI

UH-1C

- 64-14101 – Helena Regional Airport at Helena, Montana
- 66-0609 – Battleship Cove in Fall River, Massachusetts

UH-1D

- 63-08801 – Bell Aircraft Museum in Mentone, Indiana
- 64-13732 – UH-1D on display at the New Jersey Vietnam Veterans Memorial in Holmdel, New Jersey
- 65-09634 – Secret Guerrilla Unit Memorial in Middletown, Connecticut
- 65-09911 – New Orleans, Louisiana
- 65-09915 – Cole Land Transportation Museum in Bangor, Maine. It is part of the Vietnam Memorial and is visible from Interstate 395.
- 65-10054 – Estrella Warbirds Museum in Paso Robles, California
- 65-10068 – National Vietnam War Museum in Mineral Wells, Texas
- 65-10091 - National Museum of American History in Washington DC Huey Helicopter 091
- 65-10132 – Patriots Point in Mount Pleasant, South Carolina
- 66-16006 – Yankee Air Museum, Belleville, Michigan
- 66-16171 – Wisconsin National Guard Memorial Library and Museum at Volk Field Air National Guard Base in Camp Douglas, Wisconsin
- 66-16779 – Pacific Coast Air Museum in Santa Rosa, California
- 66-17044 – Museum of Alaska Transportation and Industry in Wasilla, Alaska

UH-1E

- 154760 – National Museum of the Marine Corps in Triangle, Virginia. It was formerly located at the Marine Corps Air-Ground Museum in Quantico, Virginia. This aircraft was the one Cpt. Steve Pless was flying on 19 August 1967 when he rescued four soldiers — an action that would earn him the Medal of Honor.

UH-1F

- 63-13141 – Pima Air & Space Museum in Tucson, Arizona
- 63-13143 – March Field Air Museum in Riverside, California

HH-1H

- 70-02470 – Hill Aerospace Museum in Ogden, Utah

UH-1H

- 63-8794 – US Veterans Memorial Museum in Huntsville, Alabama. It was flown by Robert Mason, author of Chickenhawk.
- 63-08848 – Yanks Air Museum in Chino, California
- 64-13502 – Evergreen Aviation & Space Museum in McMinnville, Oregon
- 64-13731 – Carolinas Aviation Museum in Charlotte, North Carolina. It served with United States Army/NC National Guard.
- 64-13866 – Chase County All Veterans Memorial in Swope Park in Cottonwood Falls, Kansas
- 64-13882 – Minnesota Air National Guard Museum, Minneapolis-St. Paul International Airport, Minneapolis, Minnesota
- 64-13895 – Pima Air & Space Museum in Tucson, Arizona
- 65-09617 – Combat Air Museum in Topeka, Kansas
- 65-09889 "Rattler 26" – Concho Valley Vietnam Veterans Memorial next to Mathis Field in San Angelo, Texas
- 65-10077 – Minnesota Air National Guard Museum, Minneapolis-St. Paul International Airport, Minneapolis, Minnesota

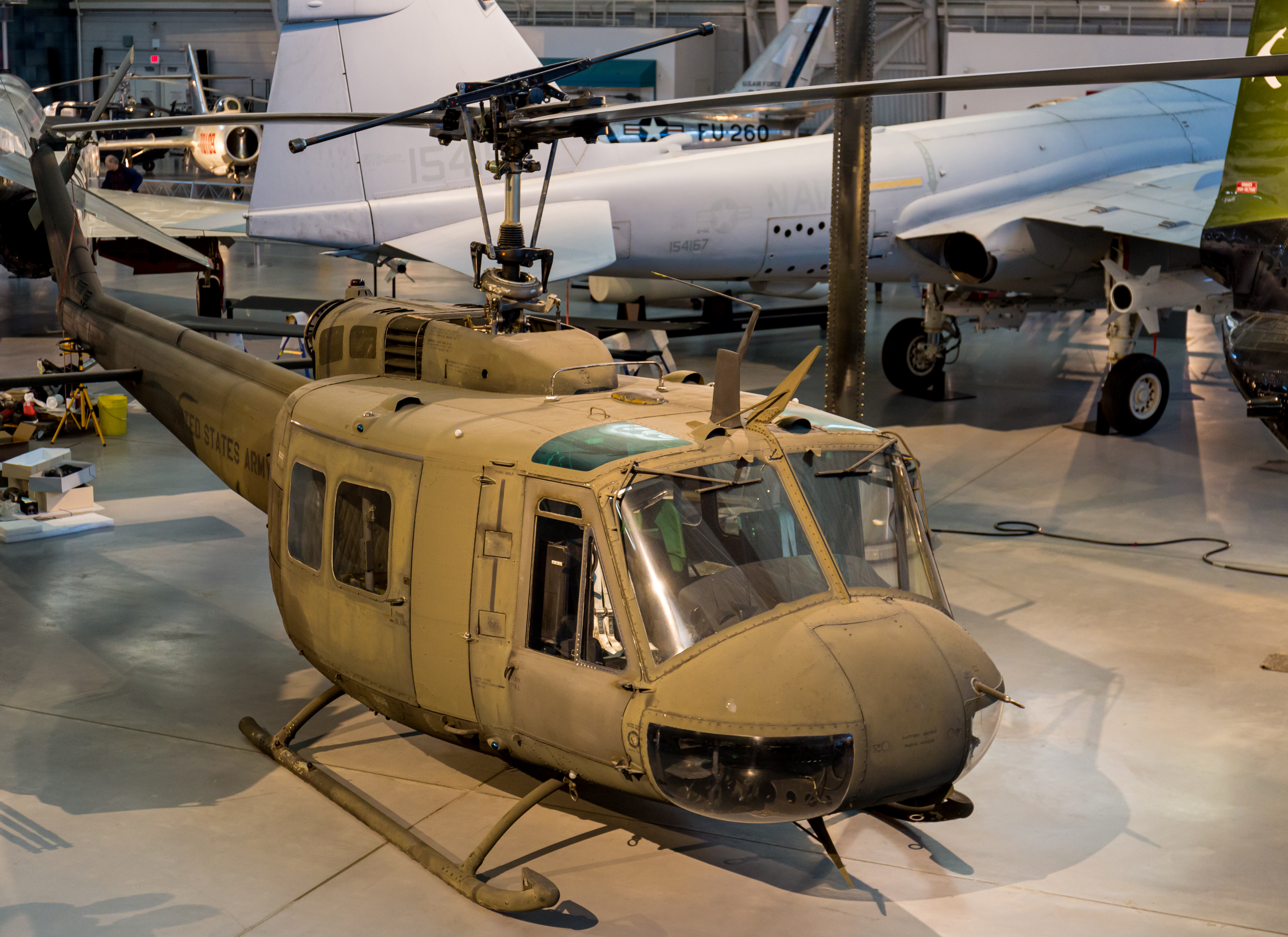
UH-1 Iroquois on display at the Udvar-Hazy Center

- 65-10126 Smokey III – Steven F. Udvar-Hazy Center in Chantilly, Virginia. It served four tours and over 2,500 hours in Vietnam.
- 65-9587 – Veterans Memorial Park in Auglaize County, Ohio
- 65-9700 – Kansas Museum of Military History in Augusta, Kansas
- 65-9803 – Veterans of Foreign Wars Post 1037 in Waupaca, Wisconsin
- 66-0765 – Tomorrow's Aeronautical Museum in Los Angeles, California
- 66-1204 – Mid-America Air Museum in Liberal, Kansas
- 66-16304 – Grandview, Iowa near the interchange of U.S. Highway 61/Iowa Highway 92 with Iowa Highway 252/148th Street as part of the All Veterans Memorial
- 66-16374 – Susanville Municipal Airport, Susanville, California
- 66-16879 – Jimmy Doolittle Center in Vacaville, California
- 66-16907 – Veterans Memorial Park in Tuscaloosa, Alabama
- 66-16923 Piranha One-One – American Legion Post 201 in Alpharetta, Georgia
- 66-17048 – Motts Military Museum in Groveport, Ohio
- 66-17113 – HEARTS Veterans Museum of Texas in Huntsville, Texas
- 67-17145 – VFW Post 5202 in Waynesville, North Carolina
- 67-17281 – Burley Municipal Airport in Burley, Idaho
- 67-17355 – Volo Auto Museum in Volo, Illinois
- 67-17368 – Selfridge Military Air Museum in Harrison Township, Michigan
- 67-17859 – Freedom Museum in Pampa, Texas
- 68-15287 – Arkansas Air & Military Museum in Fayetteville, Arkansas
- 68-15369 – Veterans Park, Belle Plaine, Minnesota
- 68-15652 – All Veterans Memorial, Emporia, Kansas
- 68-16189 – Texas Military Forces Museum at Camp Mabry, in Austin, Texas
- 68-16307 – Western Slope Vietnam War Memorial Park in Fruita, Colorado
- 68-16329 – Heartland Museum of Military Vehicles in Lexington, Nebraska
- 68-16376 – The National Vietnam War Museum in Mineral Wells, Texas
- 68-16411 – Pacific Aviation Museum Pearl Harbor, Hawaii
- 68-16594 – Greenup County War Memorial in Wurtland, Kentucky
- 68-16608 – Mississippi Armed Forces Museum, Camp Shelby, Hattiesburg, Mississippi
- 69-15140 – Museum of Flight in Seattle, Washington
- 69-15937 – Mississippi Armed Forces Museum, Camp Shelby, Hattiesburg, Mississippi
- 69-16723 – Wings of Eagles Discovery Center in Horseheads, New York
- 70-15707 – The National Vietnam War Museum in Mineral Wells, Texas
- 70-16287 -- Military Heritage Museum, Punta Gorda, Florida
- 70-16351 – SR 99E in Canby, Oregon
- 70-16369 – American Huey Museum in Bunker Hill, Indiana
- 71-20044 – HEARTS Veterans Museum of Texas in Huntsville, Texas

GUH-1H

- 65-10014 – Sweetwater, Texas

JUH-1H

- 66-16977 – Frontiers of Flight Museum in Dallas, Texas; formerly a UH-1D

TH-1L

- 157817 – American Helicopter Museum & Education Center, West Chester, Pennsylvania
- 157824 – in storage at the Flying Leatherneck Aviation Museum at Marine Corps Air Station Miramar in San Diego, California
- 157838 – Frontiers of Flight Museum in Dallas, Texas

UH-1M

- 64-14142 – Texas Military Forces Museum at Camp Mabry, in Austin, Texas
- 64-14157 – Wisconsin Veterans Museum in Madison, Wisconsin
- 65-09430 – Pima Air & Space Museum in Tucson, Arizona
- 66-00528 – Fort Irwin National Training Center, California. This aircraft is the one in which Sgt. Rodney Yano would posthumously earn the Medal of Honor by throwing burning ammunition out of the helicopter. It was previously on display at the National Warplane Museum and has the tail boom from 65-9463.
- 66-00551 – National Military Heritage Museum in St. Joseph, Missouri
- 66-15211 – Heartland Museum of Military Vehicles in Lexington, Nebraska

QUH-1M

- 65-9541 – Mt. Pisgah Cemetery in Cripple Creek, Colorado
- 66-15050 – Arkansas Air & Military Museum in Fayetteville, Arkansas

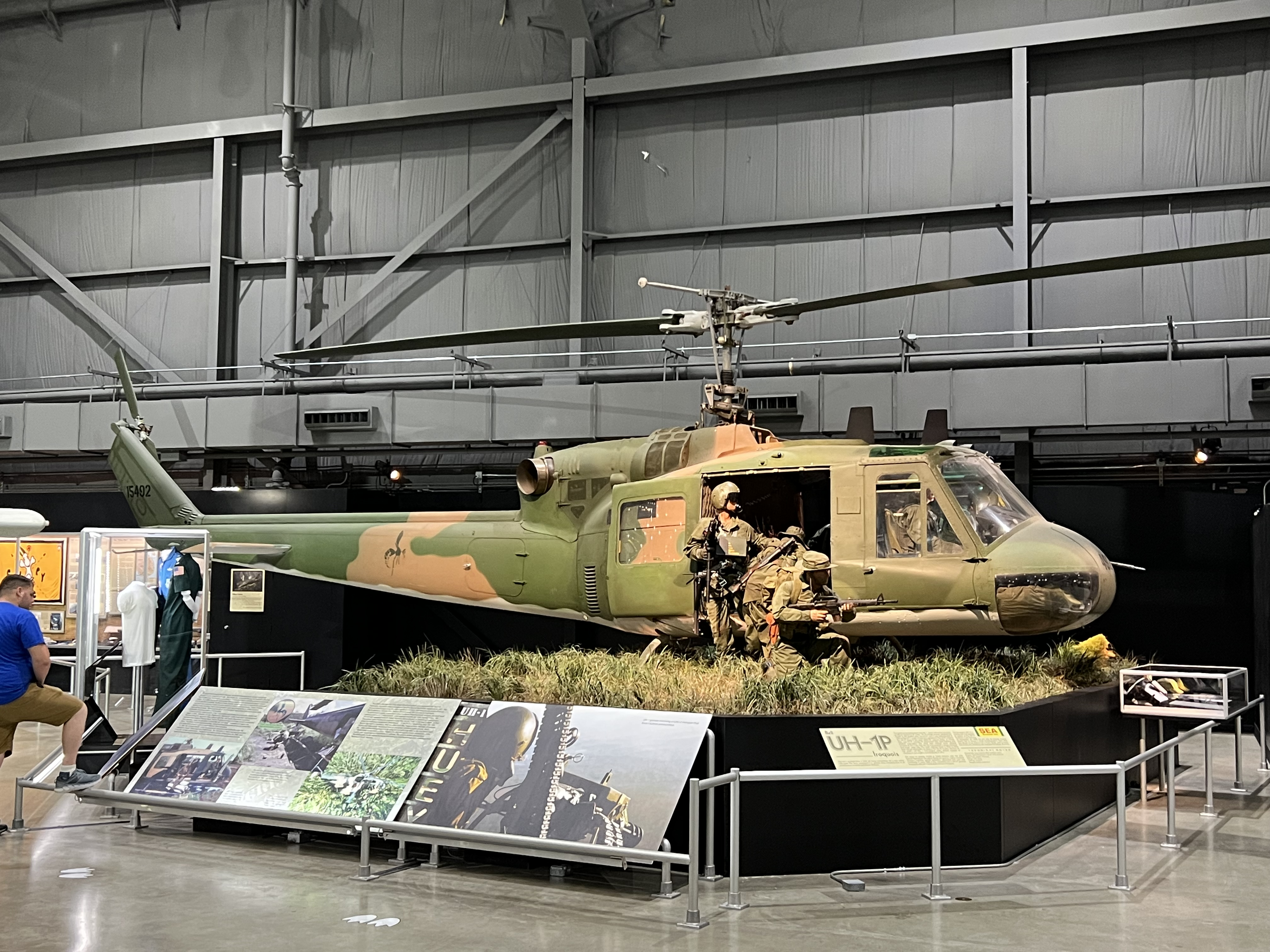
UH-1P preserved in a diorama at the National Museum of the Air Force in Dayton, Ohio

UH-1P

- 64-15476 – Southeast Asia War Gallery at the National Museum of the United States Air Force in Dayton, Ohio. Painted as '492'.
- 65-07925 – Museum of Aviation in Warner Robins, Georgia

UH-1V

- 66-17059 – Vietnam Veterans of America Chapter 659 in Endeavor, Wisconsin
- 68-15492 – Veterans of Foreign Wars Post 1309 in Smithville, Texas
- 68-16349 – Veterans of Foreign Wars Post 5850 at Eufaula Municipal Airport in Eufaula, Alabama
- 68-16614 – Wings of Freedom Aviation Museum in Horsham, Pennsylvania
- 68-16623 – American Legion Post 290 in King, North Carolina

Unknown

- There is a partially submerged UH-1 at Pennyroyal Scuba Center.

=== Vietnam ===
UH-1H

- 69-15445 – on the rooftop of the Independence Palace, Ho Chi Minh City
- 65-15753 – at the War Remnants Museum, Ho Chi Minh City
- 67-17651 - at the Vietnam Military History Museum, Hanoi
