= List of surviving Douglas A-1 Skyraiders =

== Surviving aircraft ==
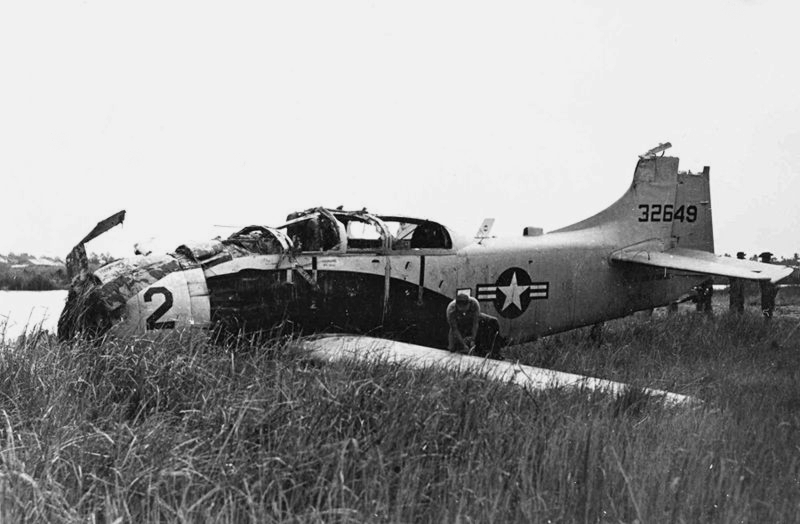
A-1E (AF Serial No. 52-132649) following combat damage in Vietnam in 1967, prior to restoration and preservation by the National Museum of the United States Air Force

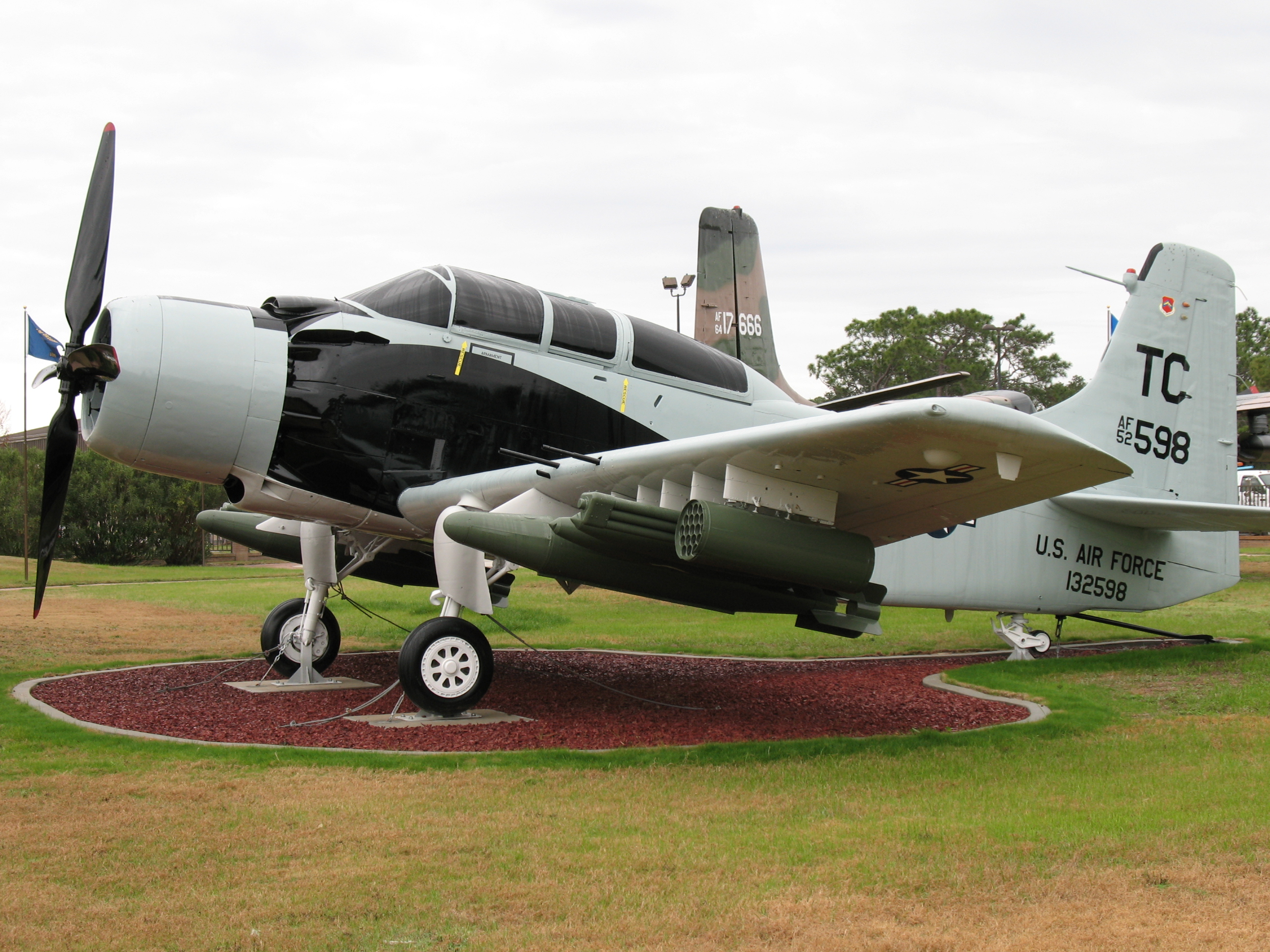
A-1G at Hurlburt Field

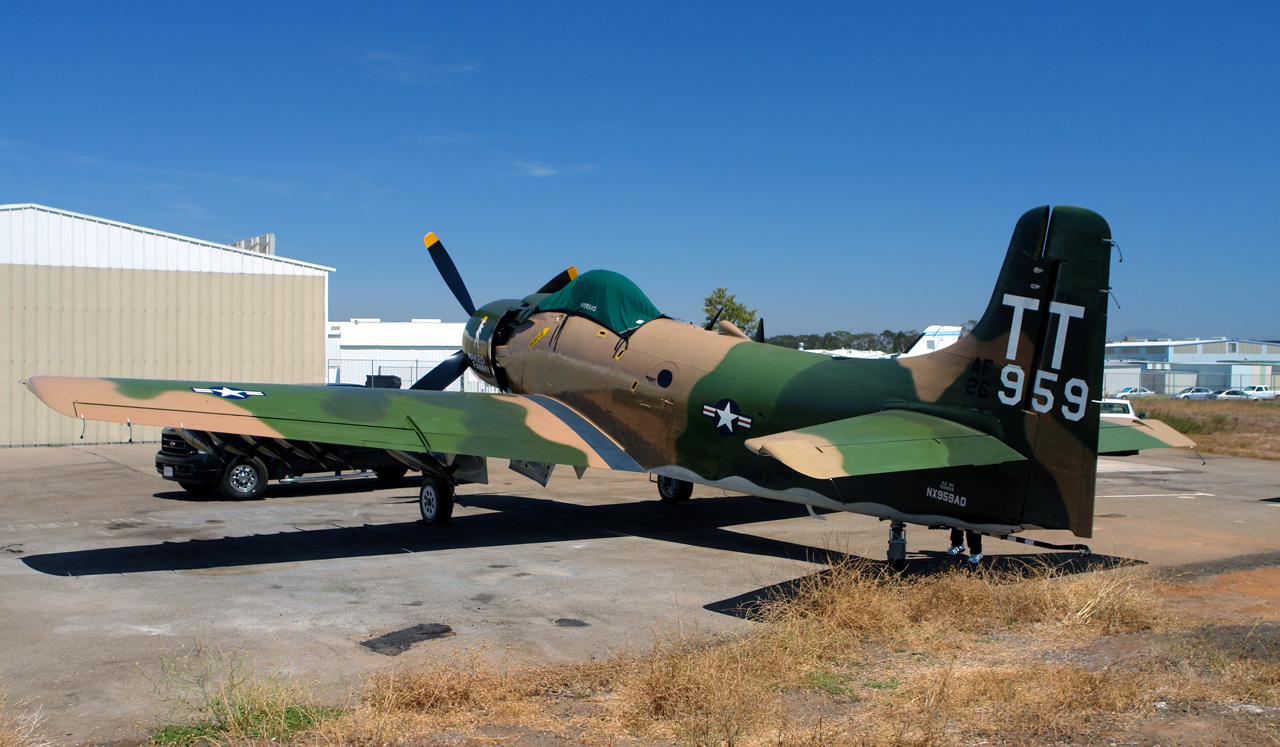
Douglas Skyraider parked at airport ramp.

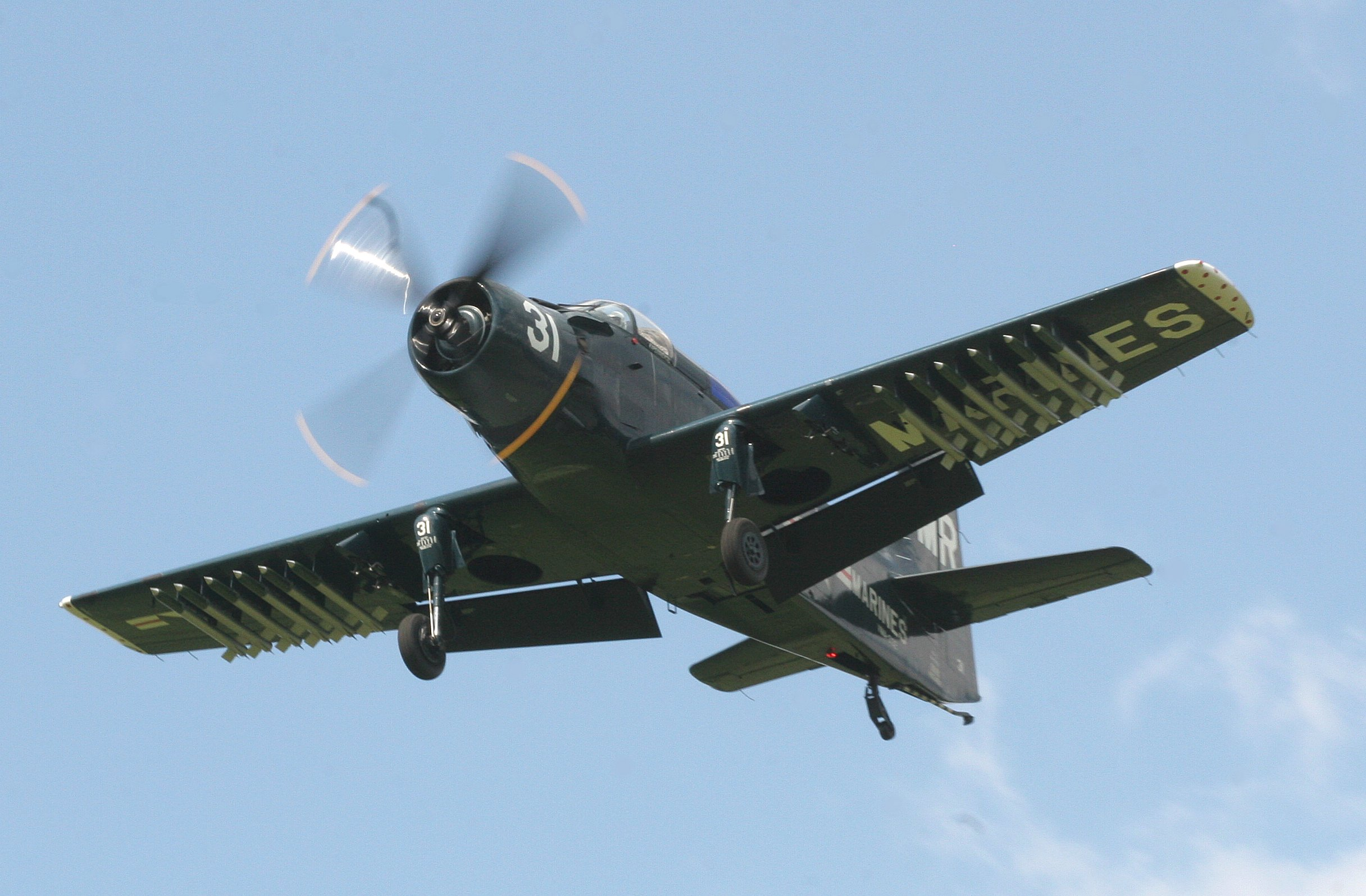
Thunder Over Michigan Air show, 2006.

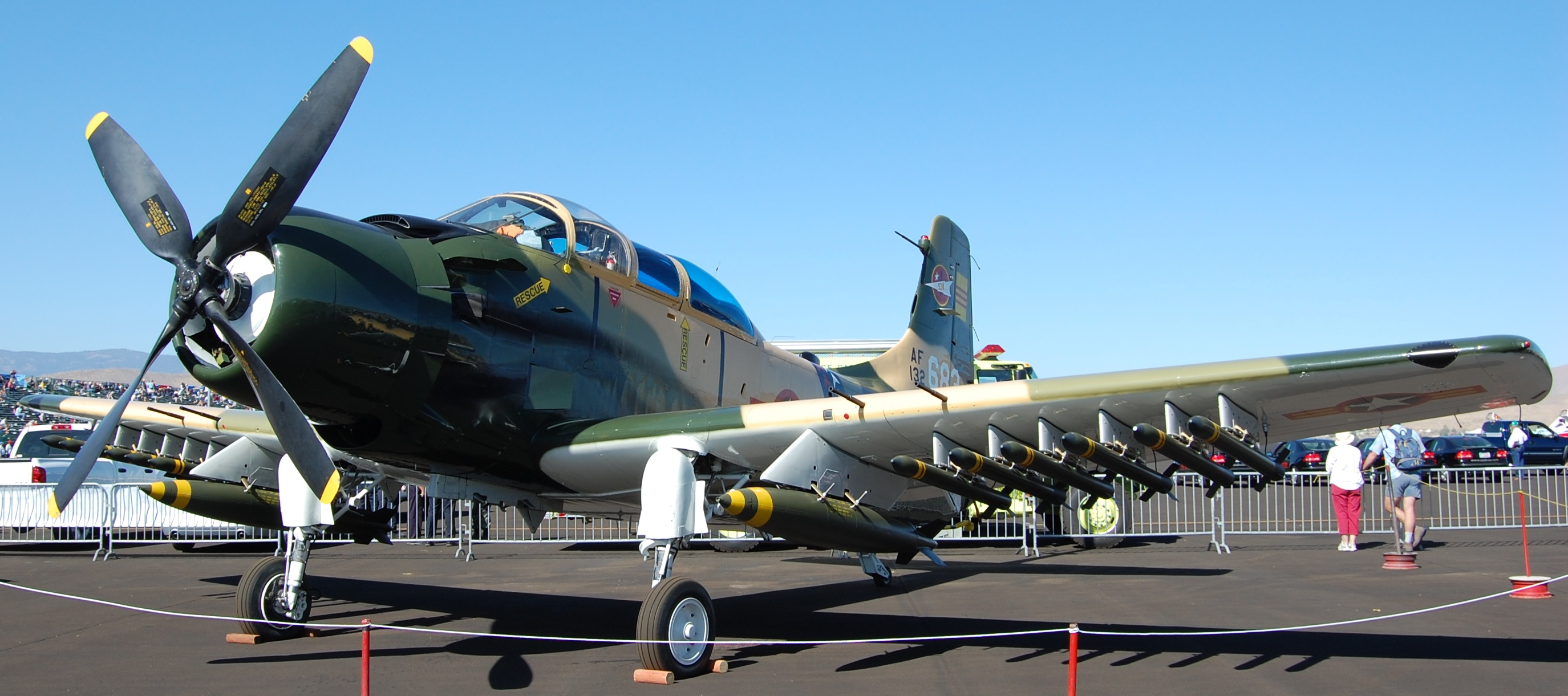
A-1E (AD-5) at Reno Air Races, 2007.

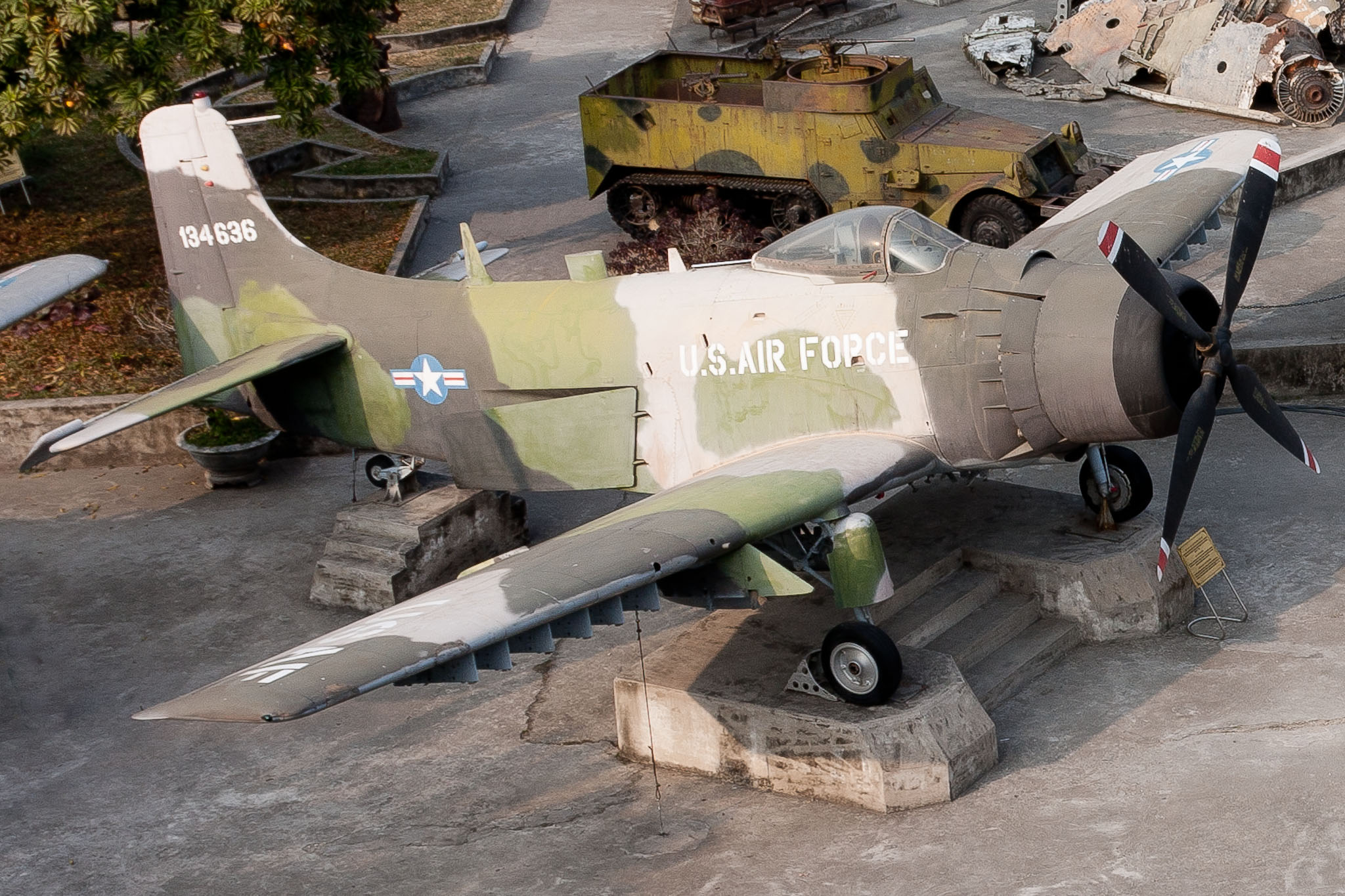
A-1H on display at the Viet Nam Military History Museum in Hanoi.

=== France ===
Airworthy

AD-4N

- 124143 – Jean Baptiste Salis. Damaged during a mid-air collision with P-51 Mustang "Big Beautiful Doll" at IWM Duxford's Flying Legends Airshow in July 2011. The P-51 was destroyed (pilot parachuted safely), and Skyraider 124143 suffered extensive damage to its right wing, but landed safely.
- 125716 – Didier Chable.

AD-4NA

- 127002 – Michele Gineste and Maurice Etchetto in Le Havre, France.

On display

AD-4NA

- 126979 – Musée de l'Air et de l'Espace.

=== Sweden ===
On display

AD-4W

- 127947– Arlandasamlingarna, Stockholm-Arlanda Airport. Svensk Flygtjänst target tug, SE-EBB. Former Fleet Air Arm Skyraider AEW.1, WT949.
- 127960 – Svedinos Bil- och Flygmuseum, Ugglarp. Currently undergoing restoration but available to visitors. Target tug used by Svensk Flygtjänst, as SE-EBC. Decommissioned in 1974 and acquired by Svedinos the same year. Former Fleet Air Arm Skyraider AEW.1, WT962.

In storage

AD-4W

- 127945 – Owned by Flygvapenmuseum but on loan to Skyraider AB, Karlskoga, for restoration. Former Fleet Air Arm Skyraider AEW.1, WV185. Used by Svensk Flygtjänst as target tug 1963-1973, registration SE-EBI. Decommissioned in 1974 and acquired by Flygvapenmuseum the same year, though never put on display.

=== Thailand ===
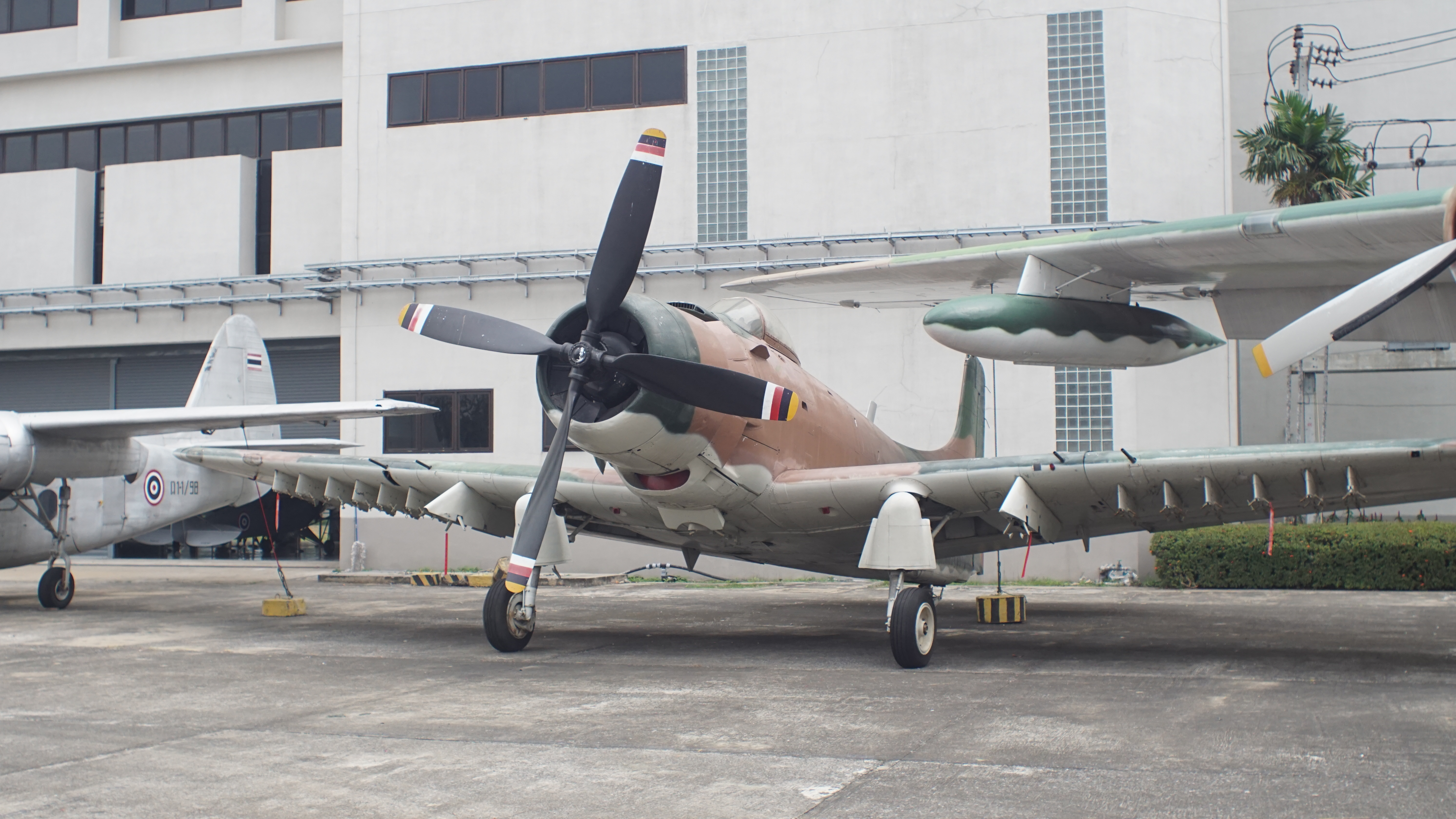
ex US Navy Bu142072 displays at Royal Thai Air Force Museum

On display

AD-7

- 142072 – Royal Thai Air Force Museum.

=== United Kingdom ===
Airworthy

AD-4NA

- 126922 – Kennet Aviation, Old Warden Aerodrome.

In storage

AEW1

- 124086 (WV106) – in storage (incomplete) at the Royal Navy's Fleet Air Arm Museum ('Cobham Hall'), visible from outside.
- 124121 (WT121) – in storage at the Fleet Air Arm Museum's 'Cobham Hall'

=== United States ===
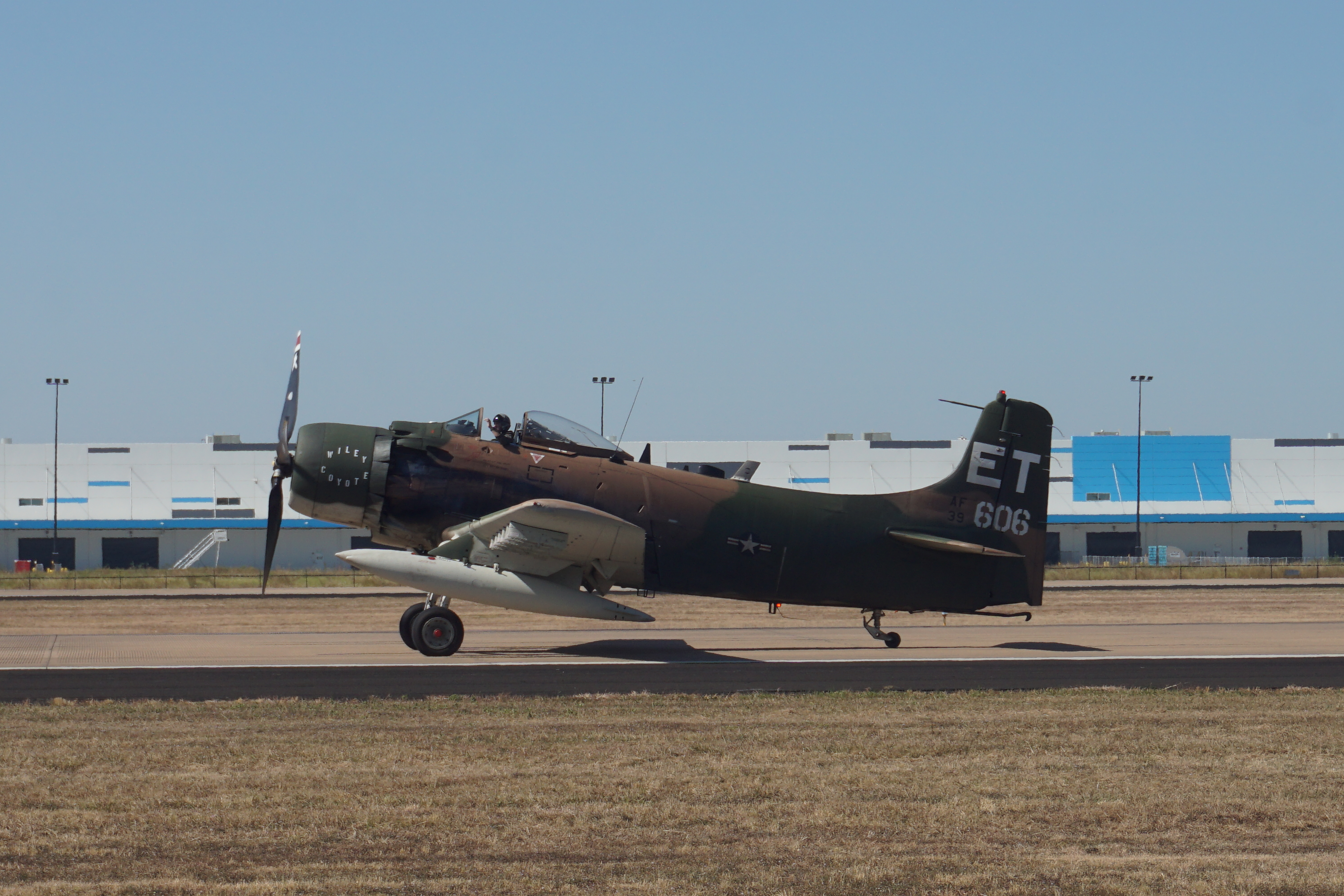
Douglas A-1 Skyraider Wiley Coyote at the 2019 Fort Worth Alliance Air Show

Airworthy

AD-1

- 9257 – based at the Warbird Heritage Foundation in Waukegan, Illinois.

AD-4

- 123827 – based at the Military Aviation Museum in Virginia Beach, Virginia.
- 126997 – privately owned in Houston, Texas.

AD-4N (A-1D)

- 124156 – privately owned in Troy, Alabama.
- 126959 – privately owned in Bennett, Iowa.

AD-4NA (A-1D)

- 126882 – based at the Lone Star Flight Museum in Houston, Texas. The aircraft survived Hurricane Ike without damage as it was flown out before the storm.
- 126965 – based at the Heritage Flight Museum in Burlington, Washington. It has a Wright R-3350-26WA with 2,700 hp. While with the US Navy, it served aboard the USS Kearsarge with VA-115 in 1953, off the coast of Korea. The cease-fire was called before it saw combat action, however, the aircraft of VA-115 conducted DMZ patrols for the duration of the cruise. When it returned stateside it was stationed with FASRON 8 at NAS Alameda before transitioning to FAETULANT at NAS Norfolk, VA from November 1954 until August 1955.
- 126997 – based at the Planes of Fame Air Museum in Chino, California. It served with the French Air Force during the Algerian War.

AD-4W

- 126867 – based at the Erickson Aircraft Collection in Madras, Oregon.

AD-5 (A-1E)

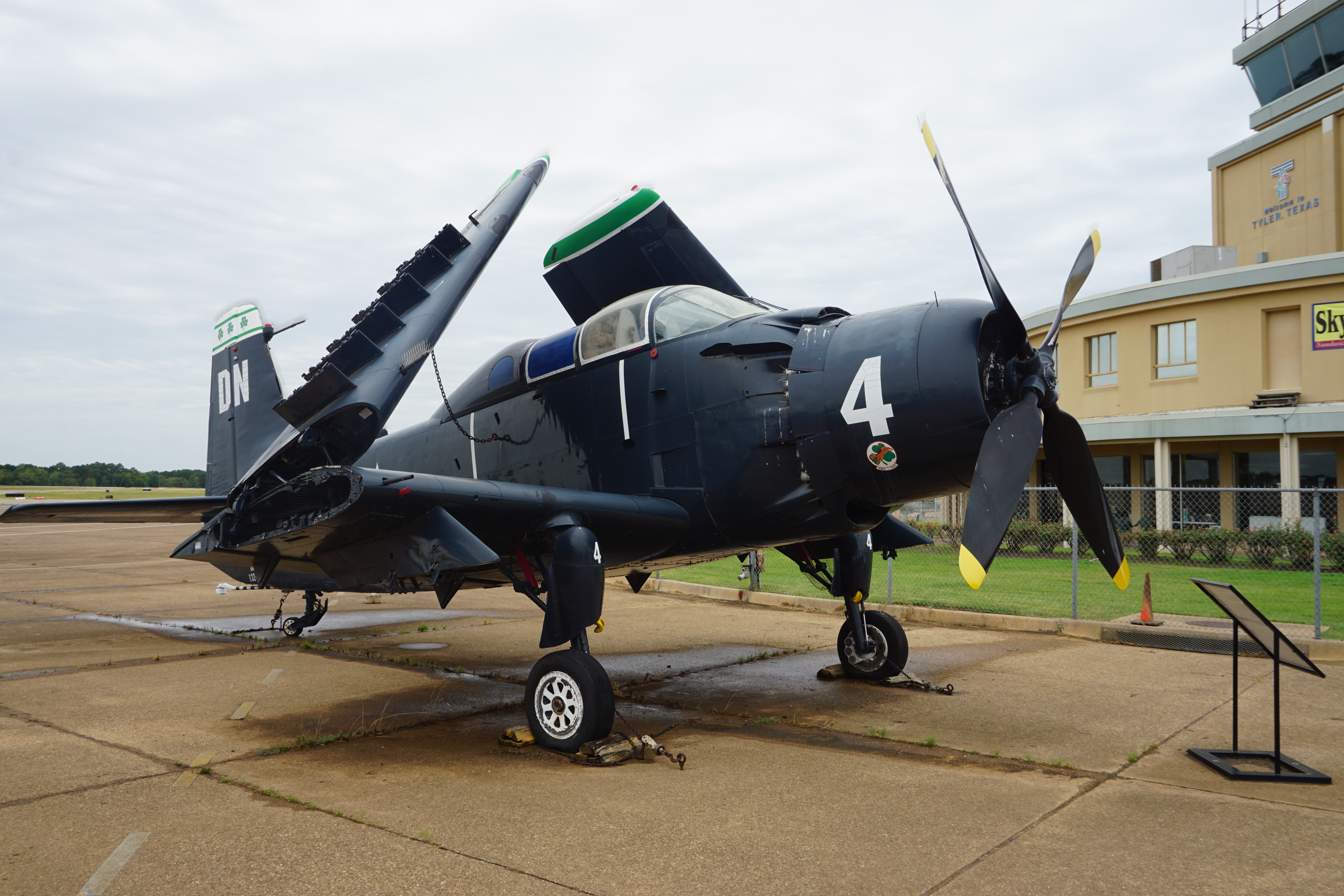
Douglas AD-5 Skyraider on display at the Historic Aviation Memorial Museum

- 132683 – based at the National Museum of World War II Aviation in Colorado Springs, Colorado.

AD-5W (EA-1E)

- 135152 – based at the Cavanaugh Flight Museum in Addison, Texas. Removed from public display when the museum indefinitely closed on 1 January 2024. To be moved to North Texas Regional Airport in Denison, Texas.
- 135178 – Owned by VINTAGE FLYING MACHINES, INC.

Huntington, Indiana.

- 135188 – based at the Collings Foundation in Stow, Massachusetts. It was donated to the Collings Foundation in May 2012.

AD-6 (A-1H)

- 139606 – based at the Cavanaugh Flight Museum in Addison, Texas. Removed from public display when the museum indefinitely closed on 1 January 2024. To be moved to North Texas Regional Airport in Denison, Texas.

On display

XBT2D-1 (XAD-1)

- 9102 – Intrepid Sea, Air & Space Museum in New York, New York.

AD-3

- 122811 – Naval Inventory Control Point (NAVICP) in Philadelphia, Pennsylvania.

AD-4N (A-1D)

- 127007 – USS Yorktown (CV-10) at the Patriot's Point Naval and Maritime Museum in Mount Pleasant, South Carolina. It bears the markings of Attack Squadron 65 (VA-65), assigned to Carrier Air Group TWO (CVG-2), aboard Yorktown, circa 1953-54.

AD-4NA (A-1D)

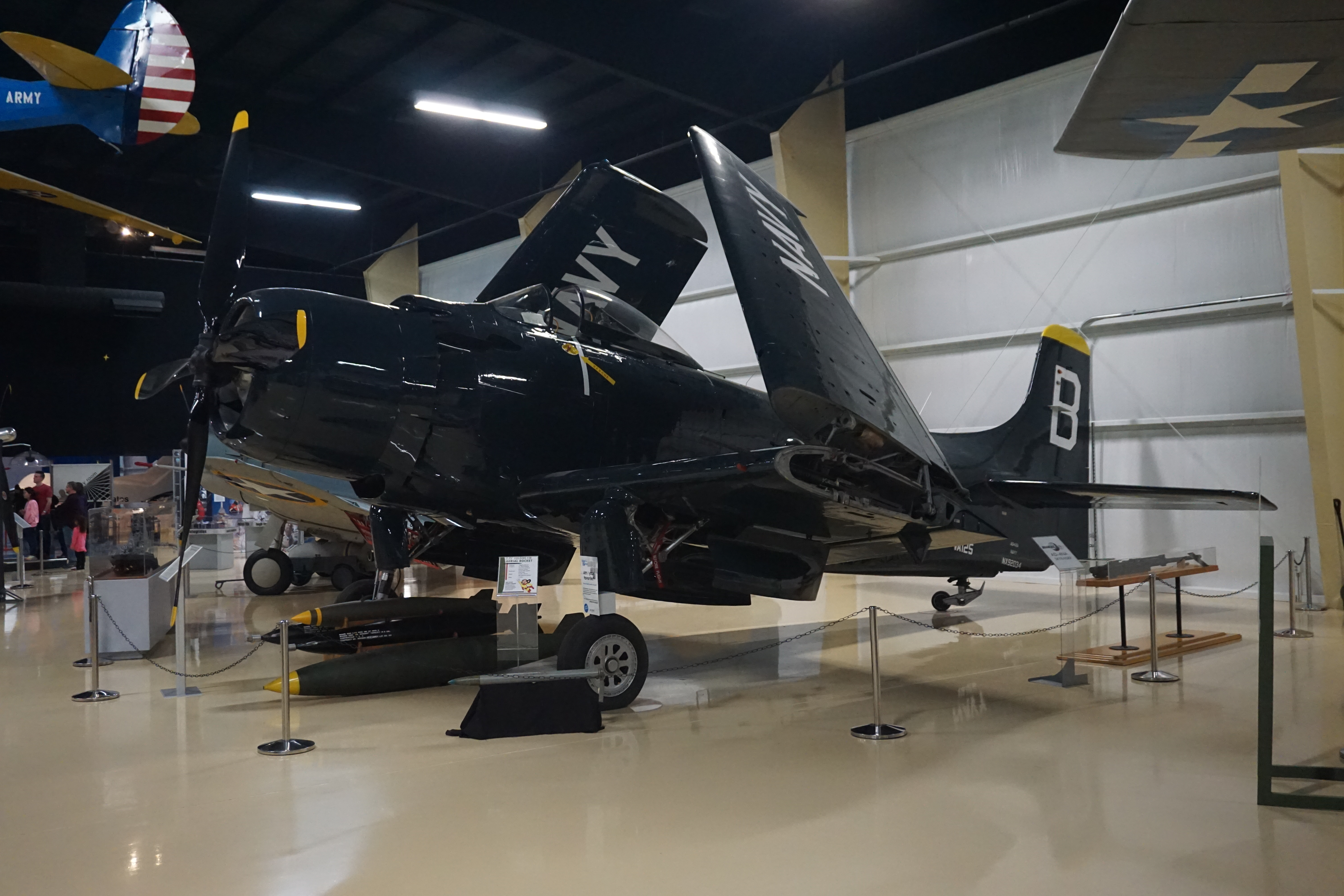
Douglas AD-4NA Skyraider on display at the Air Zoo

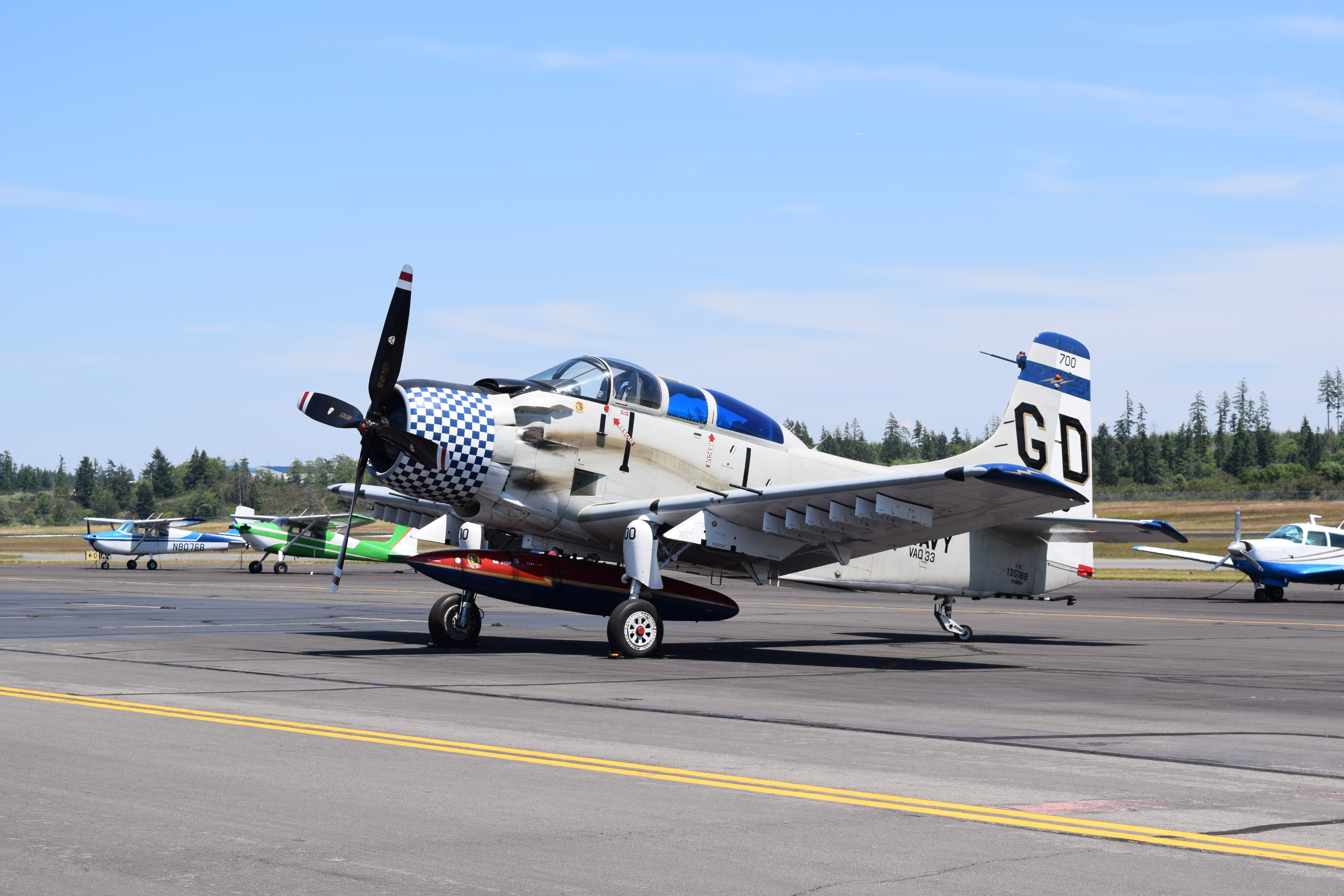
Douglas AD-5W Skyraider at Bremerton National Airport

- 125739 – United States Naval Museum of Armament and Technology, NAWS China Lake (North) in Ridgecrest, California.
- 126924 – Yanks Air Museum in Chino, California.
- 127888 – Air Zoo in Kalamazoo, Michigan.

AD-4W

- 127922 – USS Midway (CV-41) at the San Diego Aircraft Carrier Museum, in San Diego, California. According to the curators, the aircraft is actually an AD-4W that was modified to resemble an A-1 for museum display purposes. Former Fleet Air Arm Skyraider AEW.1, WT981, later Svensk Flygtjänst target tug, as SE-EBL. Decommissioned in 1976 and acquired by Flygvapenmuseum. Sold to David Talichet in 1983, as N5469Y, later donated to the National Warplane Museum. On display in San Diego since 2006.

AD-4B

- 132261 – Naval Air Station Fallon in Nevada.

AD-5 (A-1E)

- 132463 – Aerospace Museum of California at the former McClellan Air Force Base in North Highlands, California.
- 52-132649 (former bureau number 132649) – National Museum of the United States Air Force at Wright-Patterson AFB in Dayton, Ohio. This aircraft was originally a US Navy aircraft. Transferred to USAF, it was flown by then-Major Bernard Francis Fisher (Colonel, USAF Retired) on 10 March 1966 when he rescued a fellow A-1E pilot shot down over South Vietnam in the midst of enemy troops, a deed for which he was awarded the Medal of Honor. The aircraft was severely damaged in combat in South Vietnam and was returned in 1967 for preservation by the then-US Air Force Museum. It is the only surviving US Air Force Medal of Honor Aircraft.
- 52-247 – Hill Aerospace Museum at Hill AFB in Roy, Utah. It is an A-1E that was apparently remanufactured from various components taken from several other A-1s (both Air Force and Navy versions) in South Vietnam.

AD-5N (A-1G)

- 132534 – Evergreen Aviation & Space Museum in McMinnville, Oregon.
- 52-598 (former bureau number 132598) – Hurlburt Field Memorial Air Park, Hurlburt Field, Florida (USA).

AD-5W (EA-1E)

- 132443 – Historic Aviation Memorial Museum, Tyler Pounds Field (East Side) in Tyler, Texas.
- 132789 – March Field Air Museum, March AFB (former) in Riverside, California.

AD-5Q (EA-1F)

- 132532 – National Museum of Naval Aviation at NAS Pensacola, Florida.
- 135018 – Pima Air and Space Museum adjacent to Davis-Monthan AFB in Tucson, Arizona. The aircraft is painted in the markings of VAW-33 as embarked with Carrier Air Wing 6 (CVW-6) aboard the aircraft carrier USS America (CV-66) in 1967.

AD-6 (A-1H)

- 135300 – National Museum of Naval Aviation at NAS Pensacola, Florida. This aircraft is painted in the markings of Attack Squadron 25 (VA-25).
- 137602 – on a pylon near the near base headquarters and the base chapel at NAS Lemoore, California. This aircraft is also painted in the same markings as the NAS Pensacola museum aircraft, i.e., Attack Squadron 25 (VA-25) and a "false" BuNo of 135300.
- 134600 – on display at the National Museum of the United States Air Force at Wright-Patterson AFB in Dayton, Ohio. It is painted to represent the second A-1H named "The Proud American" from the 1st SOS "Hobos" - the second "Proud American" (which the museum is trying to represent) was the last USAF Skyraider to be lost in combat over Vietnam.

Under restoration or in storage

AD-4W

- 126867 – in storage at the Erickson Aircraft Collection in Madras, Oregon.

AD-6 (A-1H)

- 135332 – in storage at the National Air and Space Museum of the Smithsonian Institution in Washington, D.C.

=== Vietnam ===
On display

A-1E

- 132436 – Viet Nam Military History Museum in Hanoi.

A-1H

- 134636 – Viet Nam Military History Museum in Hanoi.
- 135344 - Huế War Museum in Huế.
- 139674 – War Remnants Museum in Ho Chi Minh City.
- 139723 – Vietnam People's Air Force Museum, Hanoi.
