= SA Airport =

SA Airport can refer to:

- San Antonio International Airport
- San Angelo Regional Airport
