= Medal of Honor Aircraft =

Awards of the United States Medal of Honor for actions involving aircraft

To date, the United States Medal of Honor has been awarded on 103 occasions for actions involving the use of aircraft. Awards for actions that took place in a single flight are the norm, with 74 individual aircraft accounting for 82 of the 93 medals awarded for actions while in flight (including eight dual awards representing the same aircraft). Of those 75 planes, 41 were destroyed during the MoH action, while others were lost later. In a few cases the MoH recipient survived while the plane did not (Jimmy Doolittle's North American B-25 Mitchell, as an example). The reverse also occurred: Lts. Jack W. Mathis and Robert E. Femoyer received posthumous awards while their respective Boeing B-17 Flying Fortresses survived, only to be scrapped later.

Some aircraft were recognized following their crew's award but were not preserved, including Butch O'Hare's Grumman F4F Wildcat, which wasn't stricken until two and one half years after his MoH action, as well as Maj. James H. Howard's "borrowed" North American P-51 Mustang, whose identity remains a mystery. In wartime often the pressing needs for serviceable aircraft overcame their need for preservation in programs or museums that did not yet exist.

== Survivors ==
Very few MoH aircraft survive today, especially since nearly half of all awards have been posthumous. Today four MoH combat aircraft still exist, plus two non-combat aircraft and the parts of one MoH Grumman F4F Wildcat.

One near-survivor was Fairchild C-123 Provider (55-4542), the aircraft MoH recipient Maj. Joe Jackson was piloting when he made his daring rescue of Air Force personnel trapped on an airstrip being overrun by Communist forces in 1968. By the time the Air Force History Office learned the aircraft still existed it had been transferred to the South Vietnamese government, who later transferred it to the Thai government. The aircraft was apparently not scrapped until the early 1990s. Another was Republic F-105 Thunderchief (63-8301), which had been piloted by Leo Thorsness while he provided cover for a rescue mission for a downed pilot. Despite having been slated for display at the National Museum of the United States Air Force, it was lost to a crash in 1974 after pilot Paul Metz was forced to eject due to engine failure.

=== In-Flight Medal of Honor Awards: Aircraft ===
Manufacturer	Model	Medals of Honor awarded	Surviving aircraft
Bell	UH-1	8 (6 Army, 1 USAF, 1 USMC)	2
Boeing	B-17	17	0
Boeing	B-29	1	0
Cessna	O-1	1	0
Consolidated	B-24/PB4Y	9 (1 Navy)	0
Consolidated	PBY	2	0
Curtiss	JN-4	1	0
DeHavilland	Model 4	4 (2 Army, 2 USMC)	0
Douglas	A-1	2	1
Douglas	A-4	1	0
Douglas	A-26	1	0
Douglas	AC-47	1	0
Douglas	SBD	2	0
Fokker	Trimotor	2	1
Fairchild	C-123	1	0
Grumman	F4F	8	1 (parts)
Grumman	F6F	1	0
Hughes	OH-6	1	0
Kaman	UH-2	1	0
Lockheed	P-38	2	0
Lockheed	F-80	1	0
Macchi	M-5	1	0
Martin	B-26	1	0
North American	B-25	3	0
North American	F-86	1	0
North American	OV-10	1	0
North American	P-51/F-6	3 (2 World War II, 1 Korea)	0
Republic	P-47	2	0
Republic	F-105	2	0
Ryan	NYP	1	1
Sikorsky	HO3S	1	0
Sikorsky	HH-3	1	0
SPAD	XIII	2	0
Vought	O2U	1	0
Vought	SB2U	1	0
Vought	F4U	4 (3 World War II, 1 Korea)	0
Total		92	7

=== Medal of Honor Awards: Aviation-related actions (aircraft not in flight and aircraft of POW's) ===
Manufacturer	Model	Medals of Honor awarded	Surviving aircraft
Bell	UH-1	3	0
Boeing	CH-46	1	1
Burgess	N-9	1	0
Kaman	HH-43	1	0
McDonnell Douglas	A-4	1	0
McDonnell Douglas	F-4	1	0
North American	F-100	1	0
Kite	Balloon	1	0
Total		10	1
