= Military Heritage & Aviation Museum =

Military Heritage Museum
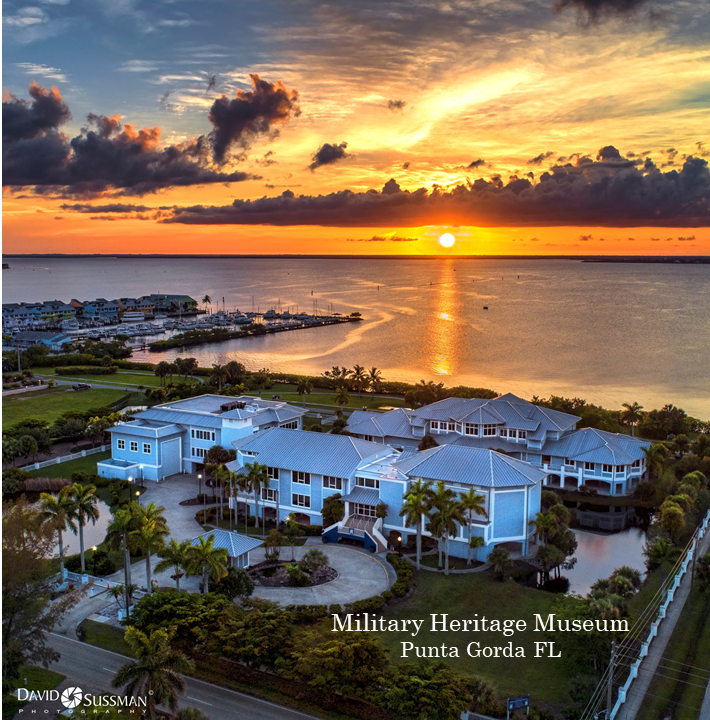

- Location within Florida
- Location: 900 West Marion Ave, Punta Gorda, Florida, USA
- Coordinates: 26.93569°N 82.05281°W
- Website: Military Heritage Museum

The Military Heritage Museum is a military museum in Punta Gorda, Florida.

== Museum history ==
The museum first opened as the Florida Military Heritage Museum at a storefront in Fishermen's Village on Pearl Harbor Day, 2001. In 2003, it merged with a local aviation museum located at Charlotte County Airport, becoming the Military Heritage and Aviation Museum. Because its lease had run out, the museum was forced to relocate to another location within Punta Gorda in 2005, but it eventually returned to Fishermen's Village in September 2007, in a new location three times as large as the previous. In April 2018, it unveiled plans to move to the IMPAC building, a former business training center located on West Marion Avenue, and began renovating the theater and outfitting two floors of the building with flight simulators and other interactive exhibits. The new location officially opened in April 2019.

== Partnerships ==
=== Memberships ===
- American Association of Museums
- Florida Association of Museums
- Charlotte County Chamber of Commerce
- Punta Gorda Chamber of Commerce
- Greater Englewood Chamber of Commerce
- Arts & Humanities Council of Charlotte County
- Charlotte County Veterans Council

=== Other partnerships ===
- American Legion Post 103
- Disabled American Veterans
- Disabled American Veterans, Chapter 82
- Florida International Air Show
- Southwest Florida Honor Flight
- Women in Military Service for America Memorial
- Women's Vietnam Memorial
- Witness to War Foundation
- Vietnam Wall of Southwest Florida, Inc.
- Charlotte Community Foundation

== Library ==
The museum contains its own library, which contains over five thousand volumes of military history, technology, biographies, and narratives.
