= Jack W. Mathis =

United States Army Air Forces Medal of Honor recipient

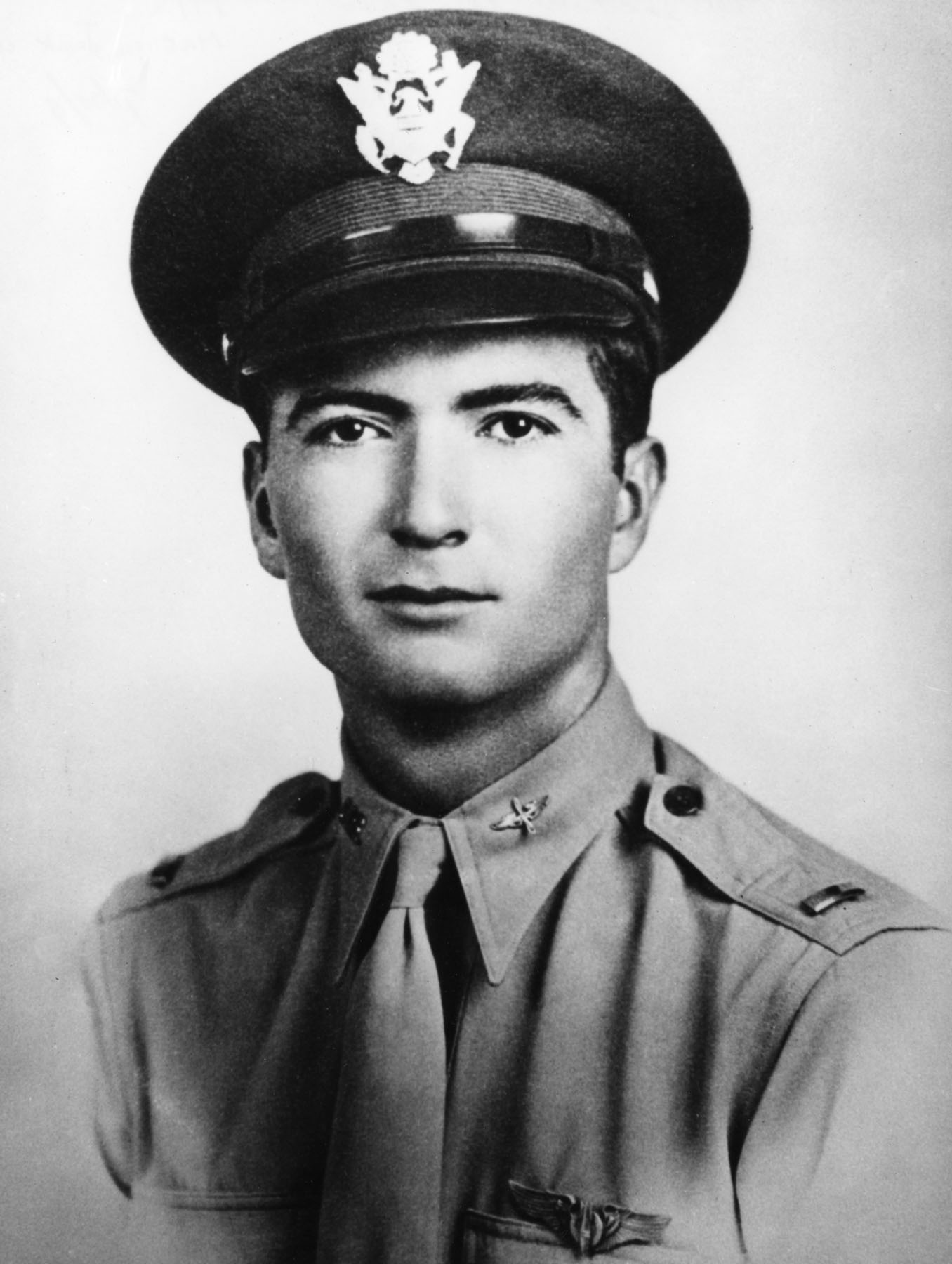
- Born: September 25, 1921; San Angelo, Texas
- Died: March 18, 1943 (aged 21); Bremen-Vegesack
- Burial place: Fairmont Cemetery in San Angelo, Texas
- Military career
- Allegiance: United States of America
- Branch: United States Army Air Forces
- Service years: 1940 - 1943
- Rank: First Lieutenant
- Units: 359th Bombardment Squadron, 303rd Bomb Group (Heavy)
- Conflicts: World War II
- Awards: Medal of Honor; Purple Heart; Air Medal (2)

Jack Warren Mathis (September 25, 1921 – March 18, 1943) was a United States Army Air Forces officer and a recipient of the Medal of Honor, the United States military's highest decoration, for his actions in World War II.

== Biography ==
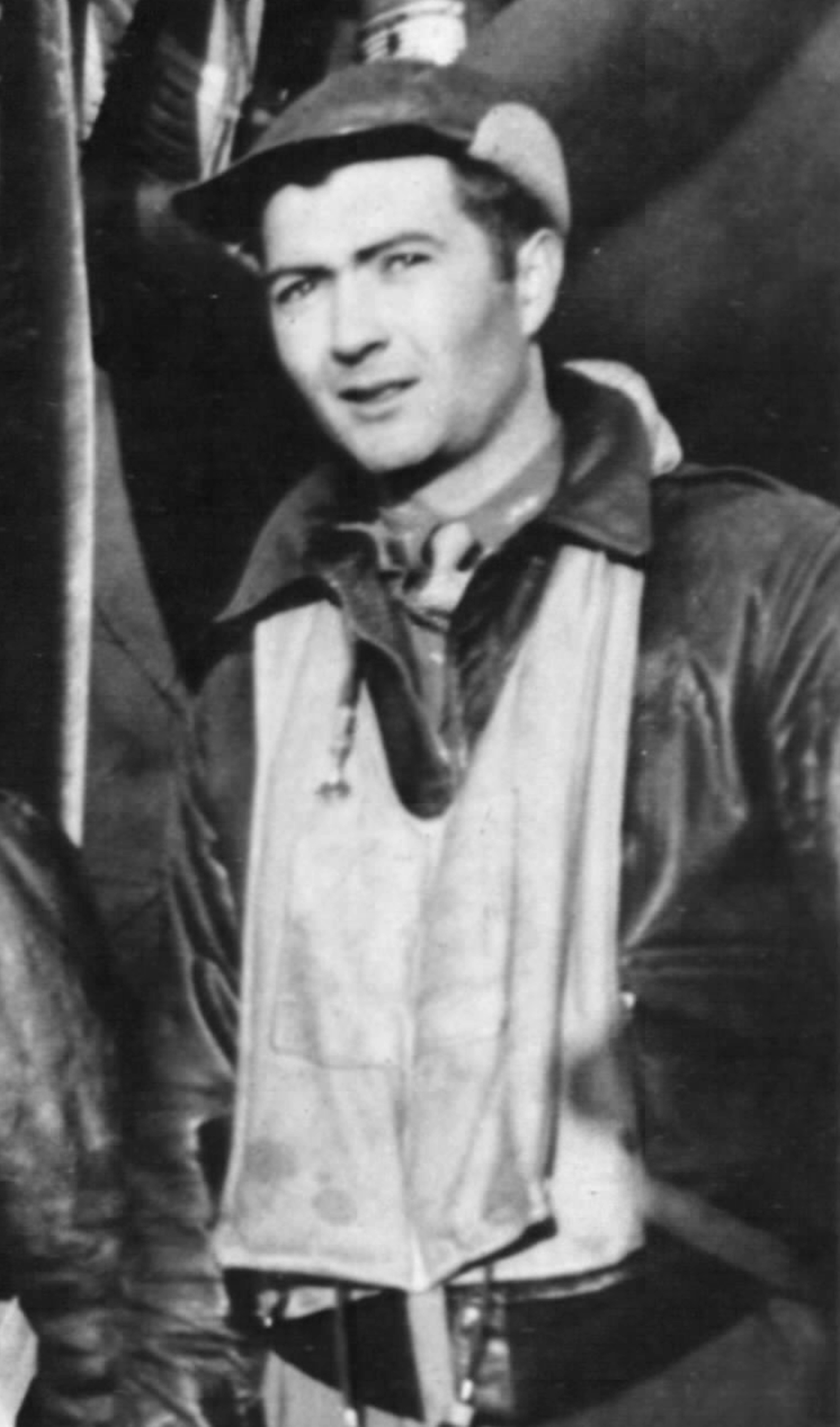
Mathis in flight gear in England, c. 1942

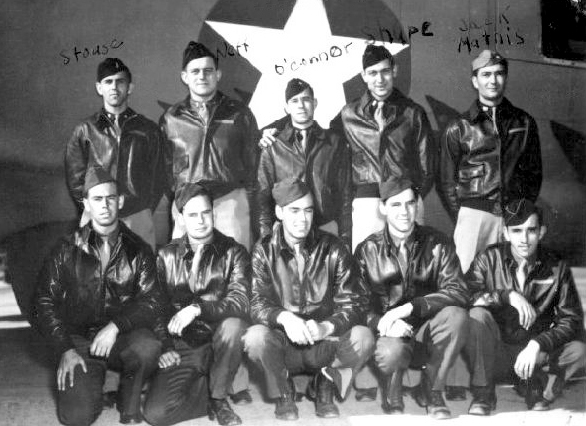
Mathis (back row right) with his flight crew (June 1942)

Jack W. Mathis was born on September 25, 1921, in San Angelo, Texas, and grew up in nearby Sterling City. He enlisted in the Army on June 12, 1940, and served in an artillery unit at Fort Sill, Oklahoma, until he learned that his brother Mark had enlisted in the then-U.S. Army Air Corps.

Mathis transferred into his brother's unit and began aviation cadet training at Goodfellow Field in San Angelo. Both were trained as bombardiers and commissioned as Second Lieutenants upon graduation. Jack Mathis was assigned to the 303d Bombardment Group of the Eighth Air Force in England, where he flew 14 missions.

On March 18, 1943, Mathis was lead bombardier on a mission over Bremen-Vegesack, Germany. As lead bombardier it was his responsibility to direct the bombing of the entire squadron. An exploding antiaircraft shell sent fragments into Mathis' plane, shattering his right arm and severely wounding him in the right side and abdomen. Despite being mortally wounded, Mathis propped himself over the Norden bombsight, located the target and dropped his bombs. He died at his post, but had directed the mission's bombing with great precision, and for his actions was posthumously awarded the Medal of Honor.

Mark Mathis was on base when the plane carrying his brother's body landed after the mission. At his own request, Mark Mathis was transferred into Jack Mathis' crew to replace him as bombardier. When the crew completed its tour of duty, Mark Mathis stayed in combat and was killed in action over the North Sea in May 1943.

Jack Mathis is buried in Fairmount Cemetery in San Angelo, Texas. His Medal of Honor is on display at the National Museum of the United States Air Force at Wright-Patterson Air Force Base in Ohio. The sports and fitness center at Goodfellow Air Force Base in San Angelo, Texas was named in his honor in 1966. Mathis Municipal Airport in San Angelo was named in honor of both Mathis brothers in 1988.

== Medal of Honor citation ==
Rank and organization: First Lieutenant, U.S. Army Air Corps, 359th Bomb Squadron, 303d Bomb Group. Place and date: Over Vegesack, Germany, March 18, 1943. Entered service at: San Angelo, Tex. Born: September 25, 1921, San Angelo, Tex. G.O. No.: 38, July 12, 1943.

Citation:

For conspicuous gallantry and intrepidity above and beyond the call of duty in action with the enemy over Vegesack, Germany, on March 18, 1943. 1st Lt. Mathis, as leading bombardier of his squadron, flying through intense and accurate antiaircraft fire, was just starting his bomb run, upon which the entire squadron depended for accurate bombing, when he was hit by the enemy antiaircraft fire. His right arm was shattered above the elbow, a large wound was torn in his side and abdomen, and he was knocked from his bomb sight to the rear of the bombardier's compartment. Realizing that the success of the mission depended upon him, 1st Lt. Mathis, by sheer determination and willpower, though mortally wounded, dragged himself back to his sights, released his bombs, then died at his post of duty. As the result of this action the airplanes of his bombardment squadron placed their bombs directly upon the assigned target for a perfect attack against the enemy. 1st Lt. Mathis' undaunted bravery has been a great inspiration to the officers and men of his unit.'

== Awards and decorations ==
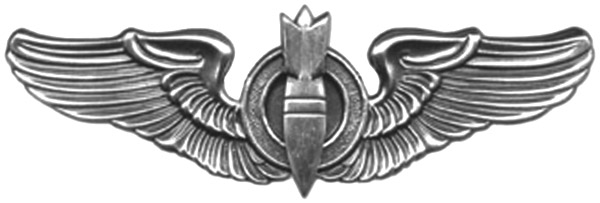

Badge	USAAF Bombardier Badge		
1st row	Medal of Honor		Bronze Star Medal
2nd row	Purple Heart	Army Good Conduct Medal	American Defense Service Medal
3rd row	American Campaign Medal	European–African–Middle Eastern Campaign Medalwith one Campaign star	World War II Victory Medal

== See also ==
- List of Medal of Honor recipients
- List of Medal of Honor recipients for World War II
