= San Angelo Regional Airport =

Airport in San Angelo, Texas, United States

San Angelo Regional Airport Mathis Field
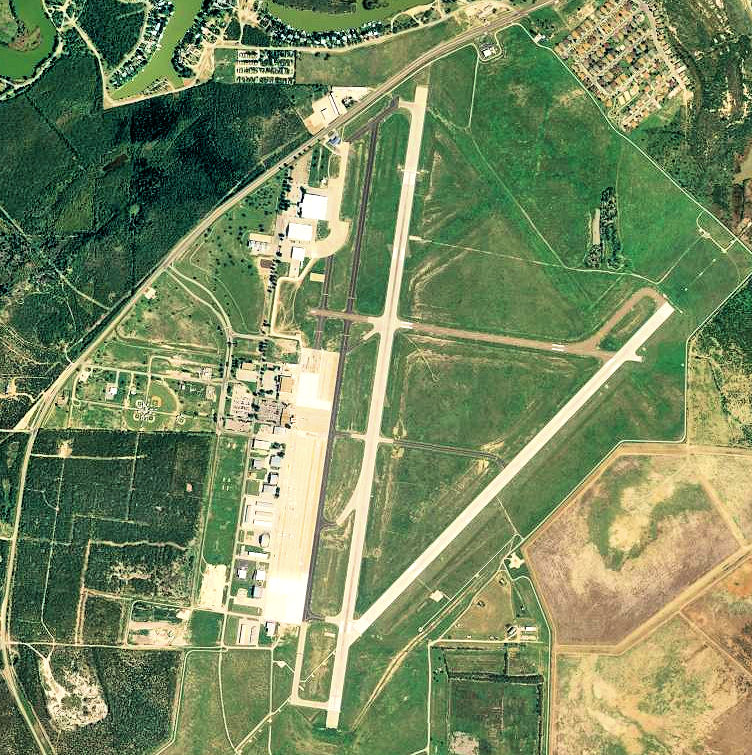
- 2006 USGS airphoto
- IATA: SJT; ICAO: KSJT; FAA LID: SJT

Summary
- Airport type: Public
- Operator: City of San Angelo
- Serves: San Angelo, Texas
- Location: San Angelo, Texas
- Elevation AMSL: 1,919 ft / 584.9 m
- Coordinates: 31°21′18″N 100°29′47″W

Map

Runways
Direction	Length		Surface
Direction	ft	m	Surface
18/36	8,049	2,453	Asphalt
3/21	5,939	1,810	Asphalt
9/27	4,402	1,342	Asphalt

Statistics (2022)
- Aircraft operations: 78,947
- Based aircraft: 131
- Source: Federal Aviation Administration

San Angelo Regional Airport (IATA: SJT, ICAO: KSJT, FAA LID: SJT), (Mathis Field) serves San Angelo in Tom Green County, Texas, United States. The airport covers 1,517 acres (614 ha) and has three runways. It has free parking.

== History ==
The airport, originally Carr Field, was built in 1941 by the United States Army Air Forces as a pilot training airfield. Activated on 1 June 1942, the airfield was assigned to the AAF Gulf Coast Training Center, with the Army Air Force Pilot School (Bomber and Specialized 2/4-Engine) activated (phase 3 pilot training). The school's mission was to train cadets to fly transports and bombers. It was transferred to the jurisdiction of the Army Corps of Engineers on 30 June 1946. Later, the facility was disposed of by the War Assets Administration and deeded to the local government.

The airport was renamed in honor of local Jack W. Mathis, a bombardier who received the Medal of Honor. It now provides daily commercial service for the City of San Angelo, its adjacent metropolitan area, and nearby Goodfellow Air Force Base, with flights to Dallas/Fort Worth International Airport.

== Overview ==
After receiving strong growth of 5.3% in enplanements per year, Mathis Field was in need of new facilities.

Nearly $4.9 million were acquired to start construction. The crown jewel of the project was the terminal and apron that were built in 1955. The terminal has had the baggage claim area expanded to ease congestion, two new jetways were added, and more room was made available for the Transportation Security Administration as new X-ray machines were to be installed as required for every commercial airport.

San Angelo Regional Airport is classified as Aircraft Rescue and Firefighting (ARFF) Index B, which makes the facility capable of handling regularly scheduled Boeing 737 Classic aircraft.

== Facilities ==
The airport is open 24 hours, but the control tower is operated by FAA contract employees and is staffed from 7:00 am until 9:00 pm.

The airport has two full-service fixed-base operators and two aircraft maintenance and repair operations on site. In addition, the facility is home to stations for U.S. Customs and Border Protection and U.S. Border Patrol.

Many new services have been built since 2008 to replace facilities or add convenience for the general aviation public. The newly constructed services include a general aviation terminal, maintenance and fuel facilities, hangars, T-hangars, and tie downs. With the new additions, the site is capable of holding about 170 aircraft. The tie downs are available at no cost.

In calendar year 2022, 131 aircraft were based at the airport. In 2022, 78,947 aircraft operations occurred, averaging 216 per day.

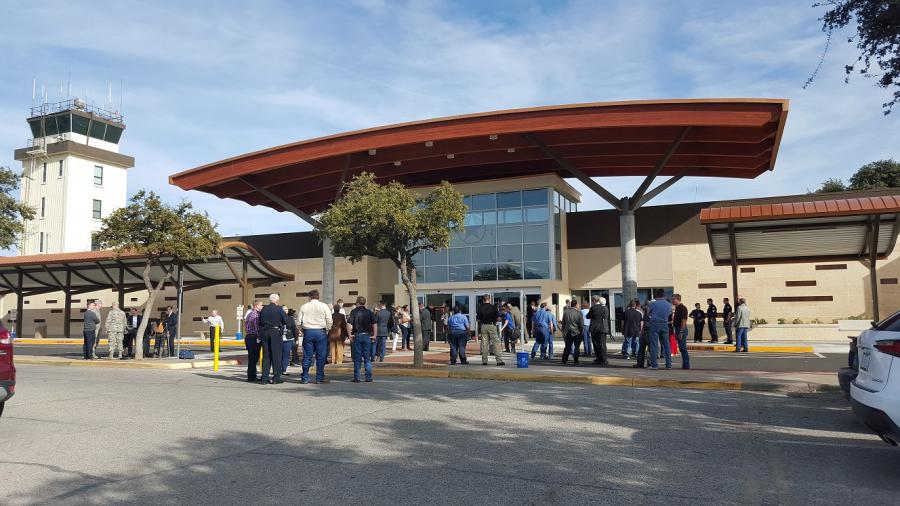
San Angelo Regional Airport

== Airlines and destinations ==
Airlines	Destinations
American Eagle	Dallas/Fort Worth

Destinations map
Destinations from San Angelo Regional Airport

American Eagle service to San Angelo is operated by Skywest (OO) Bombardier CRJ700s, Previous service was on Envoy Air Embraer ERJ-140s and Embraer E-175s for American Airlines.

== Cargo airlines ==
Airlines	Destinations
Ameriflight	San Antonio
Fedex Feeder	Austin

Ameriflight service to San Antonio is operated by Fairchild Swearingen Metroliners.

FedEx Express service to Austin is operated by Baron Aviation Services Cessna 208 Caravans.

== Past airline service ==
Continental Airlines began flying to San Angelo in the 1940s and in 1948 was flying Douglas DC-3s San Antonio - San Angelo - Big Spring - Midland/Odessa - Hobbs- Carlsbad - El Paso - Albuquerque - Santa Fe - Las Vegas, NM- Pueblo- Colorado Springs - Denver. By 1951, Continental Convair 240s flew the same basic San Antonio - Denver multistop route, but no longer stopped at Big Spring or Las Vegas. Continental operated the first turbine airliners to San Angelo, Vickers Viscounts, and by 1963, was flying Houston Hobby Airport - Austin - San Angelo - Midland/Odessa - El Paso - Tucson - Phoenix - Los Angeles and direct to Lubbock, and Amarillo via Midland/Odessa. Continental left San Angelo in 1963.

In 1949, Trans-Texas Airways (TTa) 21-seat Douglas DC-3s flew Dallas Love Field - Fort Worth - Brownwood - Coleman - San Angelo - Fort Stockton - Marfa/Alpine - El Paso. By 1961, TTa Convair 240s were flying San Angelo - Brownwood, TX - Fort Worth - Dallas Love Field - Texarkana - Hot Springs - Little Rock - Pine Bluff - Memphis, while its DC-3s flew nonstop to Dallas Love Field, San Antonio, and Midland/Odessa and direct to El Paso and Shreveport. In 1966, all TTa flights into San Angelo were Convair 600s with nonstop service to Austin, Abilene, Brownwood, and Midland/Odessa and one-stop to Dallas Love Field, Houston Hobby Airport, and El Paso. Trans-Texas Airways changed its name to Texas International Airlines in 1969.

Texas International (TI) operated the first jets to San Angelo, and in 1970, its Douglas DC-9-10s flew nonstop to Austin, Abilene, and Midland/Odessa, and direct to Dallas/Fort Worth International Airport, Houston Intercontinental Airport, San Antonio, and El Paso. In 1976, San Angelo even had international service of a sorts, as Texas International DC-9s flew four days a week to Mexico City via Abilene, Dallas/Fort Worth, and Houston according to the Official Airline Guide (OAG). This OAG lists TI DC-9 service to San Angelo from Austin, Laredo, McAllen, and San Antonio in Texas and from Abilene, Dallas/Fort Worth, and Houston. By 1978, all TI flights at the airport were DC-9s, with four flights a day to Dallas/Fort Worth via a stop in Abilene. The airline merged into Continental Airlines in 1982 and soon left San Angelo.

Rio Airways, an independent commuter airline, then began service to San Angelo, and in 1983 was flying 50-seat de Havilland Canada DHC-7 Dash 7s and 19-seat Fairchild Swearingen Metroliners, eight nonstops a day to Dallas/Fort Worth. By 1985, Rio had become a Delta Connection airline and was flying 19-seat Beechcraft 1900Cs and de Havilland Dash 7s to San Angelo, with seven flights a day from Dallas/Fort Worth International Airport. By 1989, Atlantic Southeast Airlines (ASA) had replaced Rio as the Delta Connection carrier at San Angelo, and was flying 19-seat Embraer EMB-110 Bandeirantes and 30-seat Embraer EMB-120 Brasilias to DFW. Also, competition to Dallas/Fort Worth existed, as American Eagle had begun service to San Angelo with 19-seat BAe Jetstream 31s and 37-seat Gulfstream I-Cs. In 1995, American Eagle and Delta Connection were continuing to compete to DFW with all American Eagle flights to the airport being 34-seat Saab 340s, while Delta Connection/ASA still flew Brasilias and Bandeirantes to San Angelo. By 1999, San Angelo was no longer being served by Delta Connection; Delta eventually closed their DFW hub, leaving American Eagle as the only airline flying nonstop to Dallas/Fort Worth. American Eagle would eventually retire all of their turboprops, including the ATR-72, and begin operating regional jets on all code share flights for American Airlines, which includes their current service to San Angelo.

Over 40 years after Continental Airlines left San Angelo, the airline started code share service on Colgan Air (Continental Connection) Saab 340s nonstop to Houston Intercontinental Airport. This ended in 2008 and Continental later merged into United Airlines.

== Ground transportation ==
A number of companies offer taxi and shuttle service throughout San Angelo and the surrounding Tom Green County area. Transportation Network Companies, such as Uber and Lyft, also provide service at the airport. The airport is served onsite by Avis and Budget car rental companies. Enterprise Rent-A-Car is available off site. The airport was previously served by Dollar, Hertz, and Thrifty, but services ceased in July 2019.

== See also ==
- List of airports in Texas
