= List of displayed Boeing B-52 Stratofortresses =

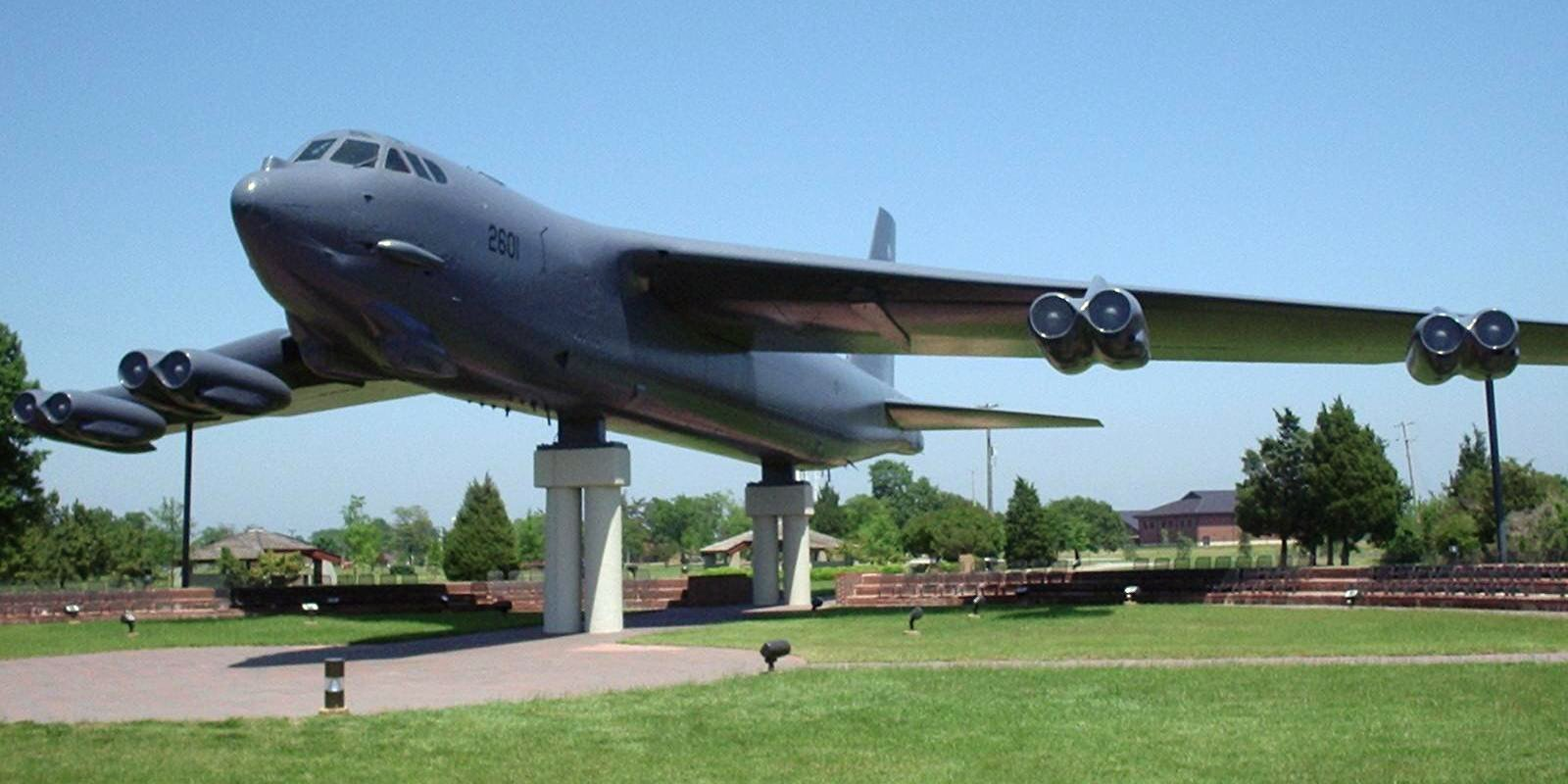
B-52G-130BW 59-2601, at Langley AFB, Hampton, Virginia, USA

The Boeing B-52 Stratofortress is a long-range, subsonic, jet-powered, strategic bomber operated by the United States Air Force (USAF) since 1955. The B-52A first flew in 1954, and the B model entered service in 1955. A total of 744 B-52s were built, with the last, a B-52H, delivered in October 1962. It served in the Strategic Air Command and the Air Combat Command, the B-52H continues to serve in the Air Force Global Strike Command and the Air Force Reserve Command.

The B-52D models have the distinction of being the last bombers in aviation history to have shot down enemy aircraft during wartime with machine guns (tail gunners); two Vietnam War “MiG killer” bombers are currently preserved and on display at Fairchild AFB and the United States Air Force Academy.

Only the B-52H model is still active in the Air Force inventory. It is primarily assigned to the Air Force Global Strike Command and the Air Force Reserve Command, with one additional example in the Air Force Materiel Command supporting flight research operations with NASA.

== Surviving aircraft ==
=== Australia ===
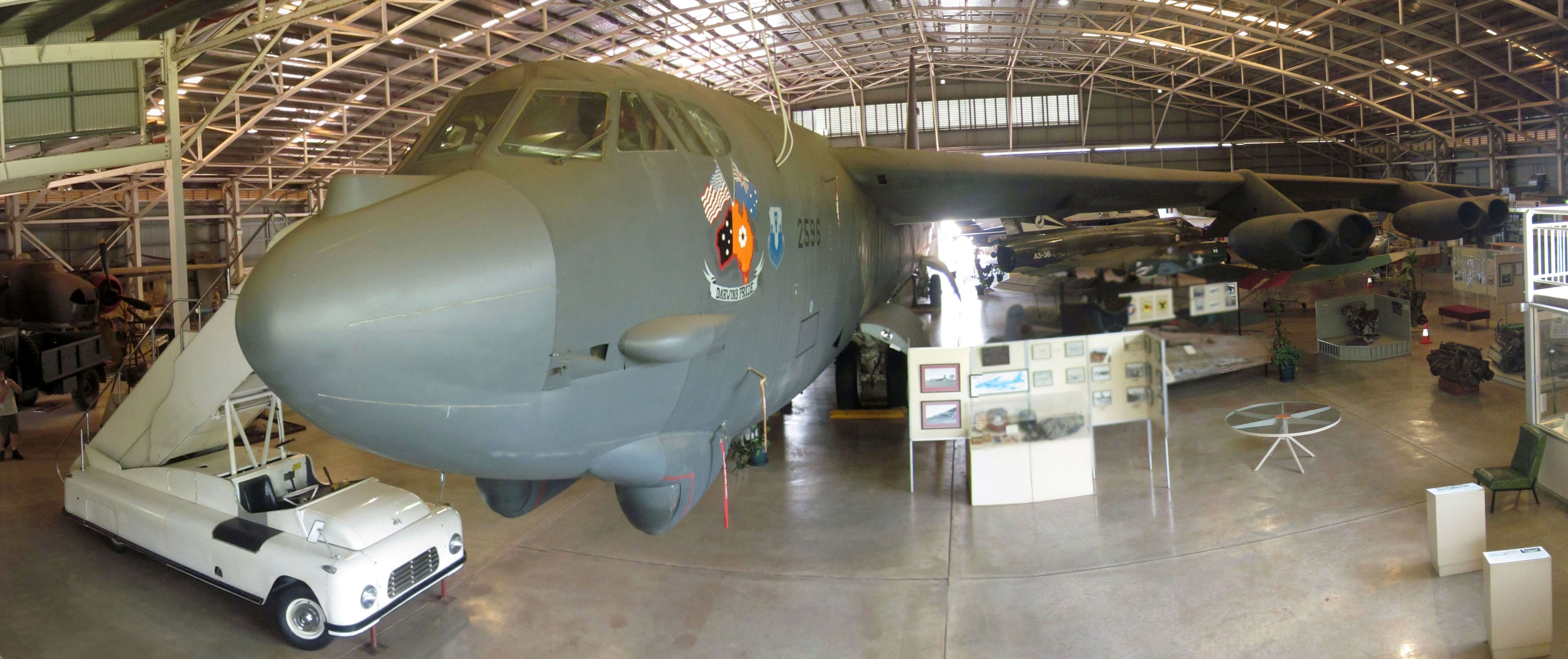
Boeing B-52G bomber on display at the Darwin Aviation Museum

B-52G

- 59-2596 Darwin's Pride – Darwin Aviation Museum in Winnellie, Northern Territory.

=== South Korea ===
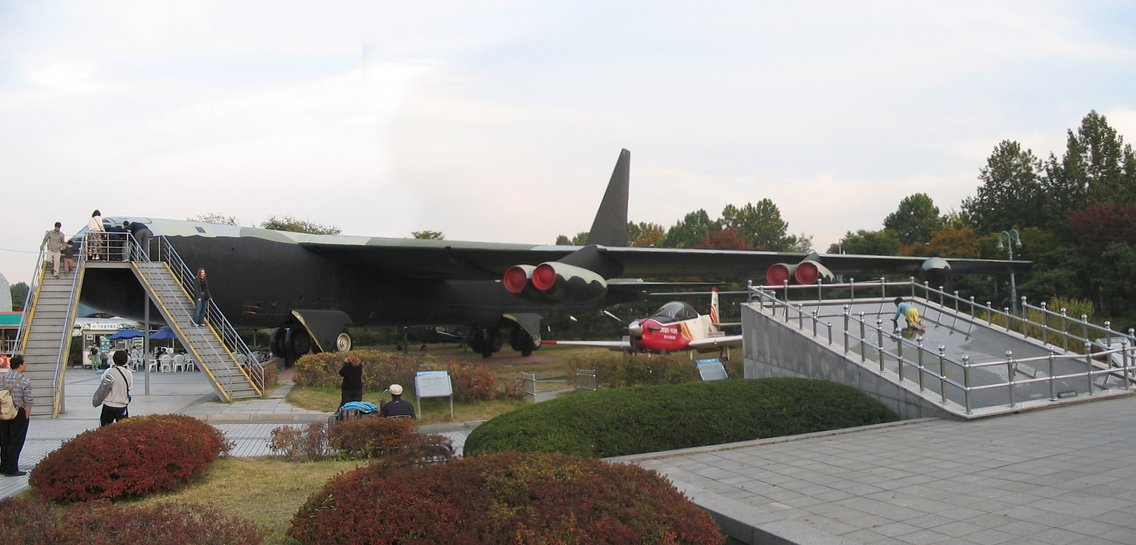
55-0105 at the War Memorial of Korea

B-52D

- 55-0105 – War Memorial of Korea, Seoul, was operated by the 4258 SW at U-Tapao Royal Thai Navy Airfield in Thailand and the 96 BW at Dyess AFB, Texas.

=== United Kingdom ===
B-52D

- 56-0689 – Imperial War Museum Duxford, Duxford, England, was operated by the 28th BW and 7th BW at Carswell AFB. The B-52D is located in the American Air Museum building, alongside B-29A 44-61748 "It's Hawg Wild". B-52D 56-0689 is one of the largest and heaviest aircraft to have ever landed at the airfield.

=== United States ===
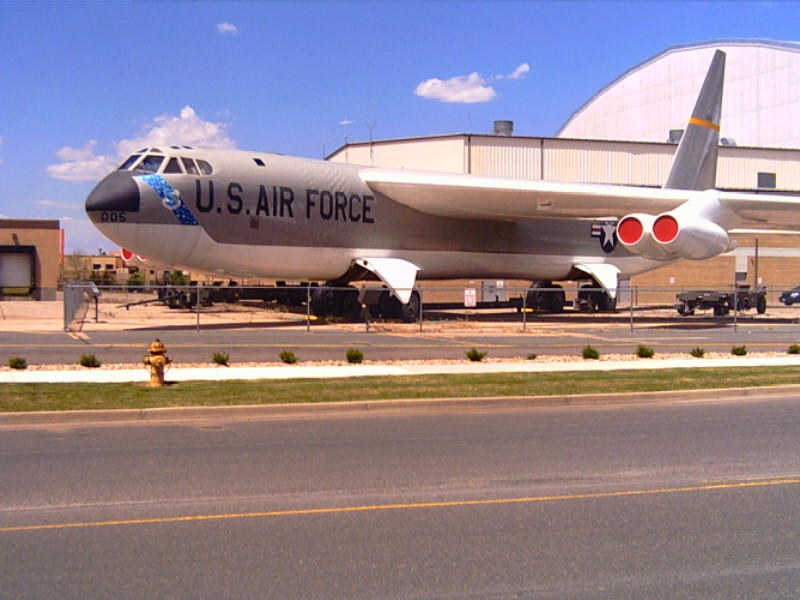
B-52B-5BO 52-005 at Wings Over the Rockies Air and Space Museum

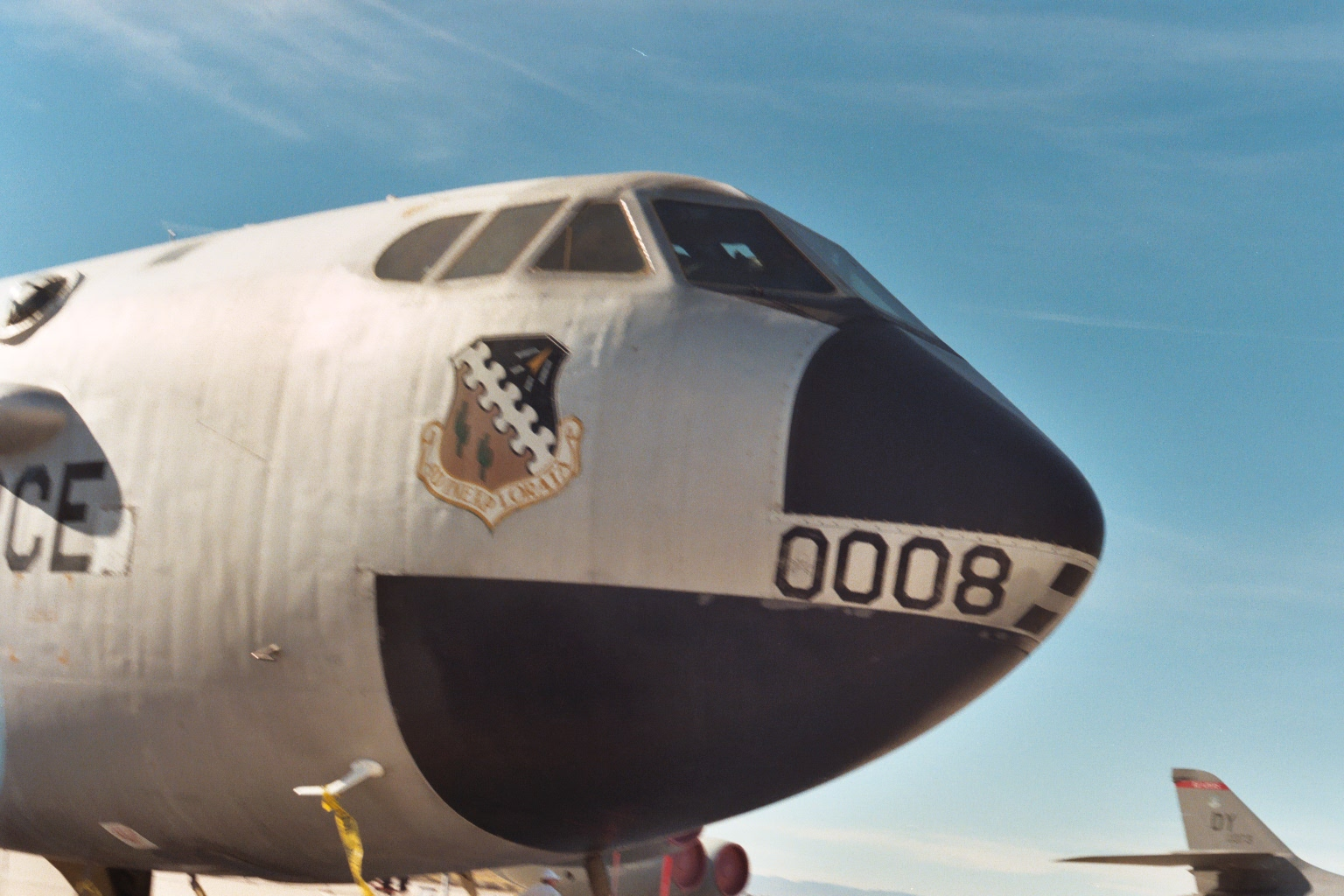
B-52B-10BO 52-008 at Edwards Air Force Base Museum, Edwards AFB, California

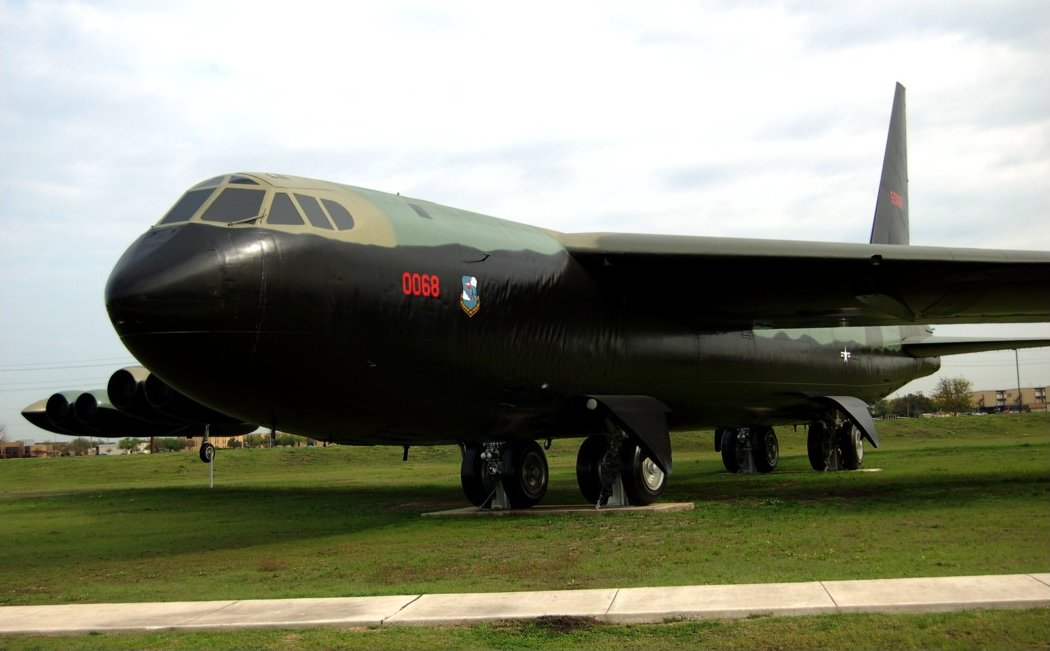
55-0068 at the USAF History & Traditions Museum, Lackland AFB, Texas

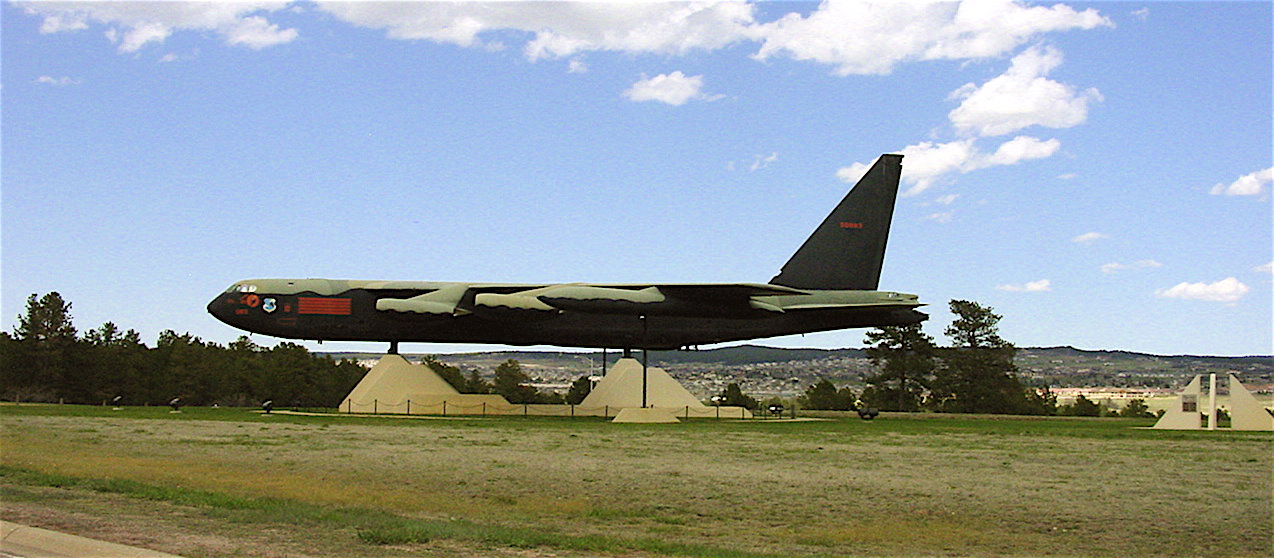
55-0083 at the US Air Force Academy, in Colorado Springs, Colorado

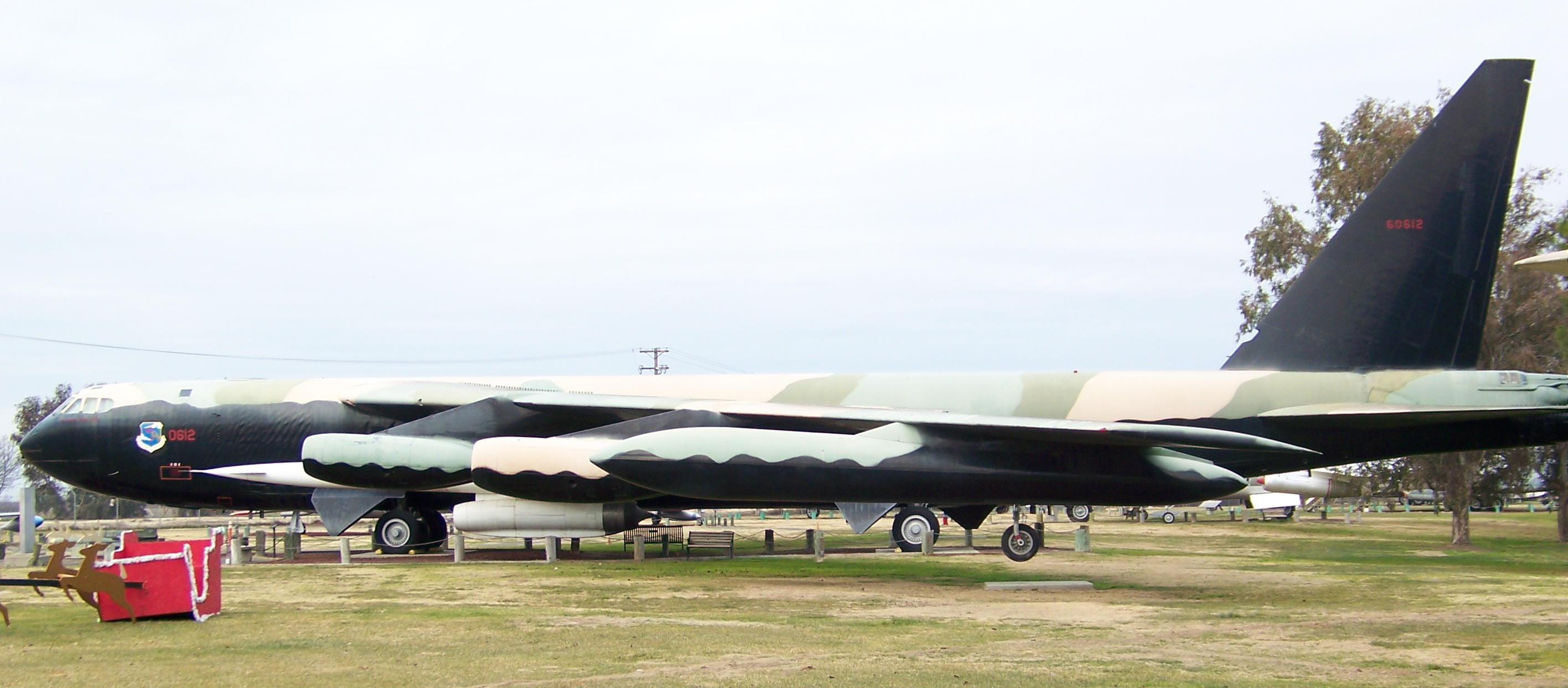
56-612 at the former Castle AFB, California

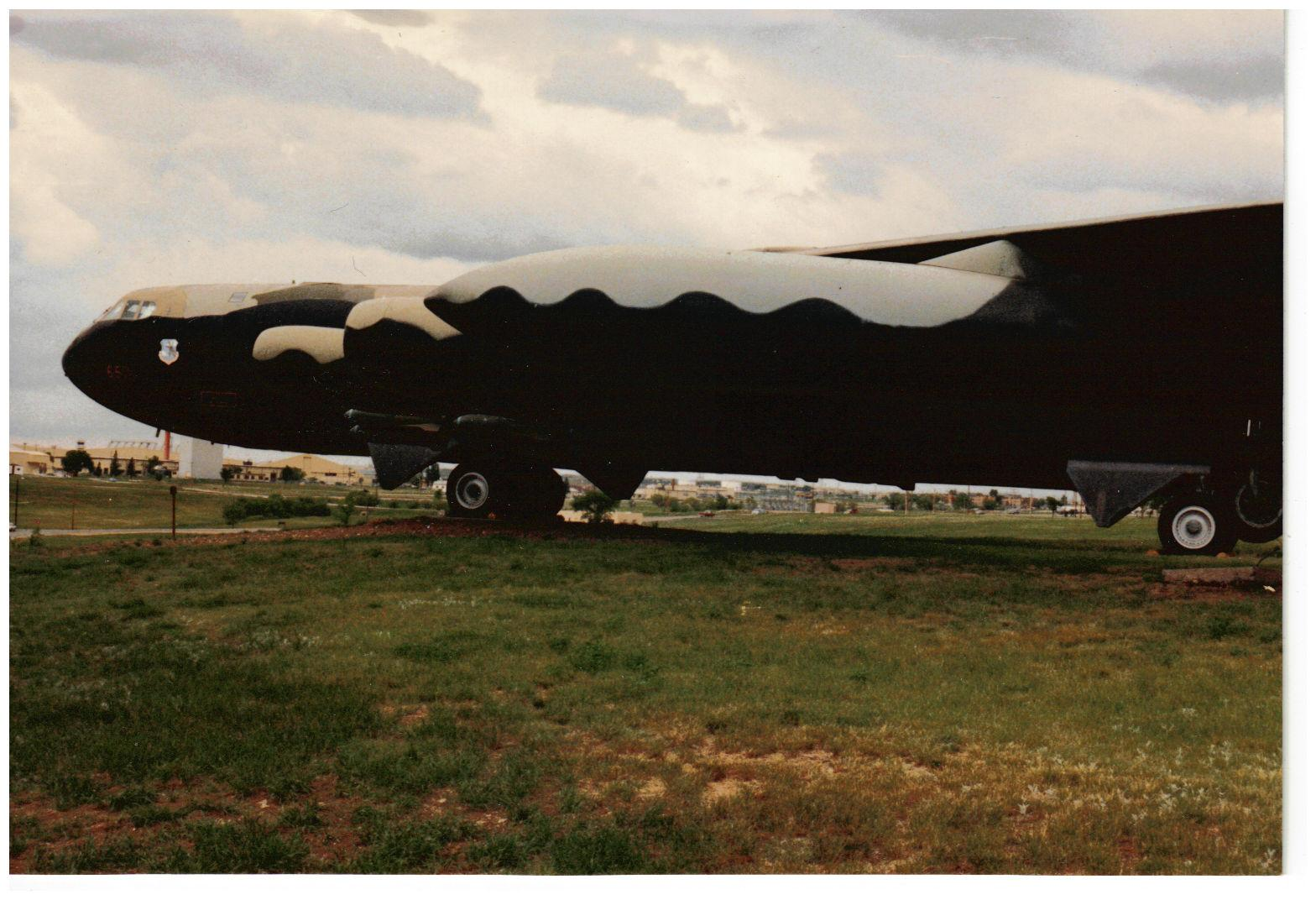
B-52D s/n 56-0657 Ellsworth AFB

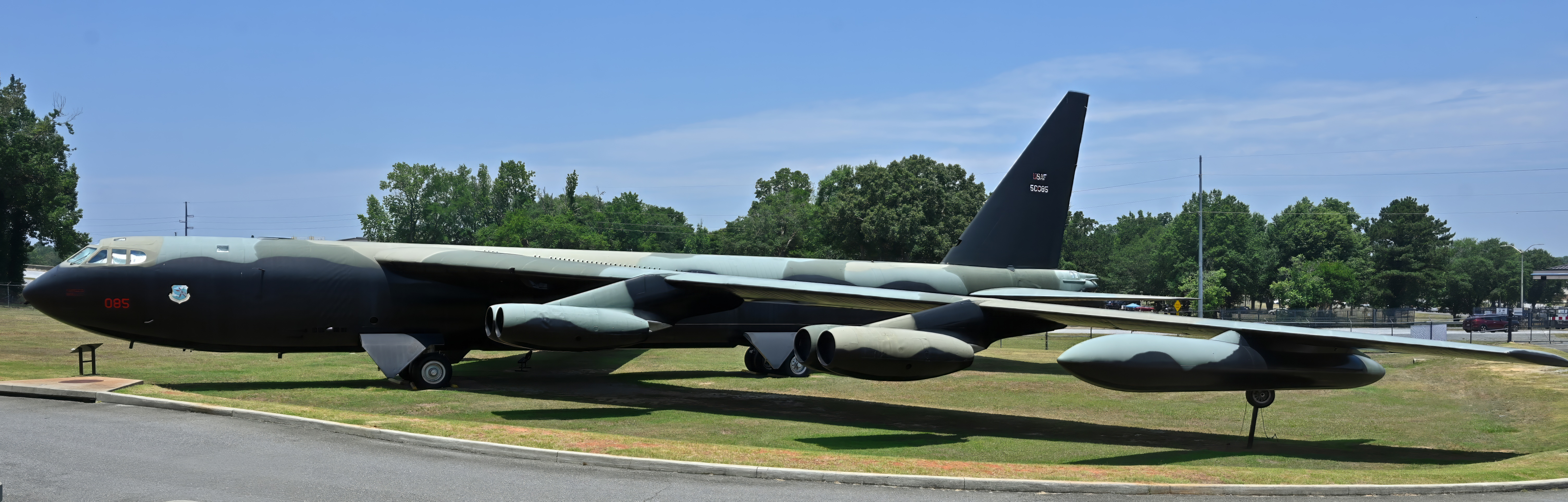
55-0085 at the Museum of Aviation

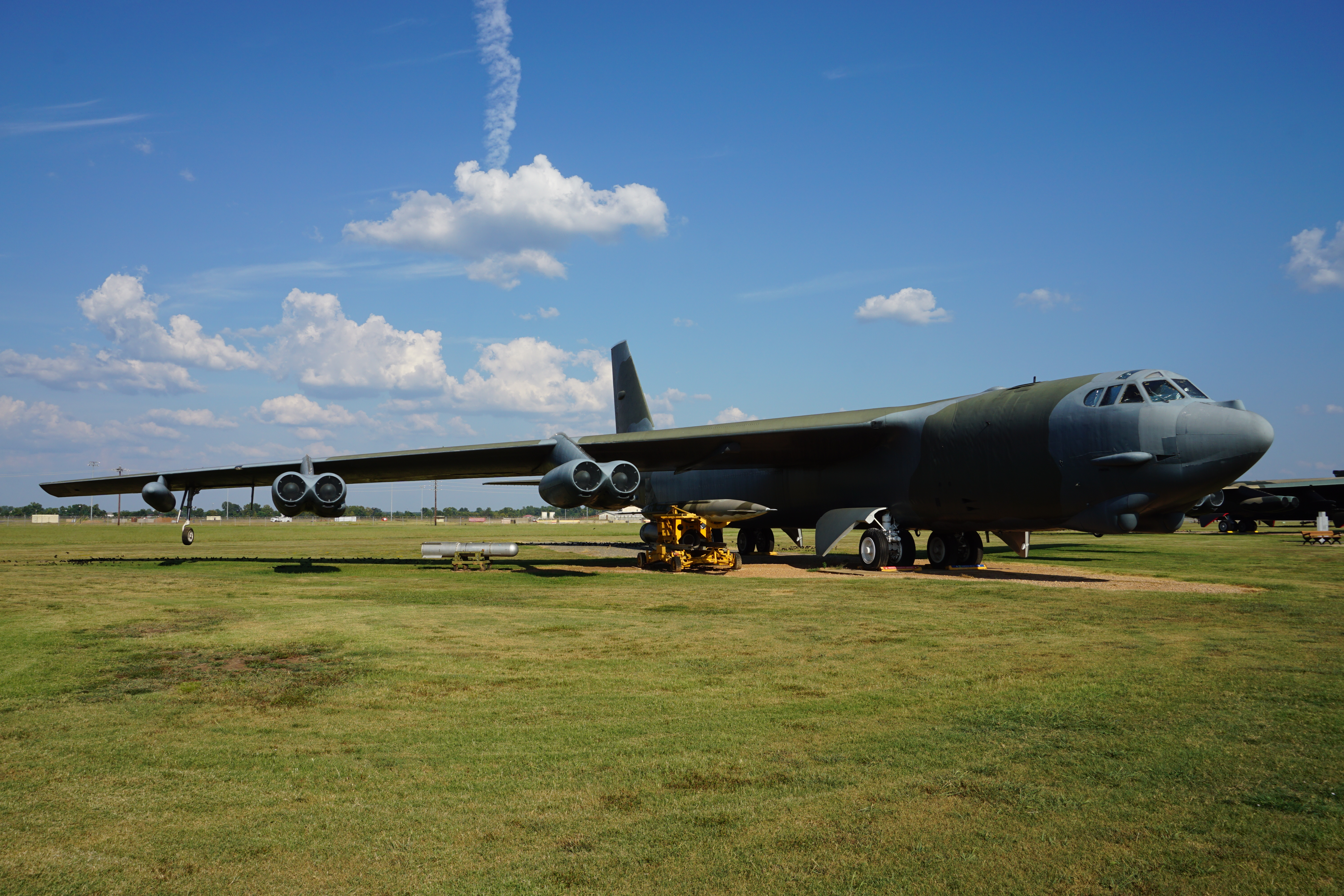
B-52G at the Barksdale Global Power Museum

NB-52A

- 52-0003 – Pima Air & Space Museum adjacent to Davis-Monthan Air Force Base in Tucson, Arizona. It is a converted B-52A that was used by the Air Force Flight Test Center at Edwards AFB, California as the X-15 Launch Aircraft; now on display and marked as 0003 The High and the Mighty One.

B-52B

- 52-0005 – under restoration at the Wings Over the Rockies Air and Space Museum (former Lowry AFB), Denver, Colorado. It is marked as "005 ", and was accepted on 3 March 1955. It was operated by the 6515th Maintenance Group (Air Research & Development Command) at Edwards AFB, 93rd BW / 330th BS at Castle AFB, 3415th MSG (ATC) at Lowry AFB, then redesignated as a GB-52B training airframe at the Lowry Technical Training Center, withdrawn from service April 1982.

NB-52B

- 52-0008 – Edwards AFB Museum, California. It is marked as "0008", originally a B-52B then modified as a RB-52B then NB-52B. Assigned to NASA as Balls 8 for use as a mothership for the X-15, X-38, and X-43A, withdrawn from service on 17 December 2004.

RB-52B

- 52-0013 – Heritage Park at the National Museum of Nuclear Science and History adjacent to Kirtland AFB in Albuquerque, New Mexico. It was the drop aircraft for the first-ever U.S. airdrop of a live thermonuclear weapon (in the 1956 Redwing Cherokee test), later took part in Operation Dominic in 1962, and is the sole surviving B-52 to have actually dropped a live nuclear weapon.
- 52-8711 – Strategic Air Command & Aerospace Museum in Ashland, Nebraska. It was originally a B-52B, and was the first operational B-52 delivered to the Air Force, entering service with the 93d Bombardment Wing on June 29, 1955.
- 53-0379 – Although not preserved as such, the aircraft sits on the edge of Rogers Dry Lake south of Edwards Air Force Base, California (34.818730, -117.852651). It was used for barrier testing until 1970, and has been located on the photo range for some time.

B-52D

- 55-0057 – Maxwell Air Force Base, Alabama. It was operated by the 306th BW at McCoy AFB, Florida and the 7th BW at Carswell AFB, Texas.
- 55-0062 – K.I. Sawyer Heritage Air Museum on the former K.I. Sawyer AFB, Michigan. It was accepted by the USAF in February 1957.
- 55-0067 – Pima Air & Space Museum, adjacent to Davis-Monthan AFB in Tucson, Arizona. It is marked as "067 The Lone Star Lady" and was operated by the 7th BW at Carswell AFB and withdrawn from service on 5 November 1982.
- 55-0068 – USAF History & Traditions Museum, Lackland AFB, San Antonio, Texas.
- 55-0071 – Battleship Memorial Park, Mobile, Alabama.
- 55-0083 – United States Air Force Academy, Colorado Springs, Colorado.
- 55-0085 – Museum of Aviation, Robins AFB, Warner Robins, Georgia. It was operated by the 99th BW at Andersen AFB, Guam and the 7th BW at Carswell AFB, Texas.
- 55-0094 – Kansas Aviation Museum, Wichita, Kansas. It was accepted by the USAF on 30 April 1957 and participated in Arclight.
- 55-0095 – Only nose and cockpit section preserved, Valiant Air Command Warbird Museum, Titusville, Florida.
- 55-0677 – Yankee Air Museum, Willow Run Airport, Ypsilanti, Michigan. It is marked as "677" and was operated by the 43rd BW at Andersen AFB, Guam and participated in Linebacker II as part of the 96th BW at Dyess AFB, Texas.
- 55-0679 – March Field Air Museum, March Air Reserve Base (former March AFB) in Riverside, California. It is marked as "679" and was accepted by the USAF on 5 June 1957 and operated by the 92nd BW at Ellsworth AFB, South Dakota; 494th BW at Sheppard AFB, Texas; 509th BW at Pease AFB, New Hampshire and Andersen AFB, Guam; 454th BW at March AFB, California; 22nd BW at Andersen AFB, Guam; 99th BW at Andersen AFB and U-Tapao RTAFB, Thailand;, 43rd SW at U-Tapao RTAFB;, 7th BW at Carswell AFB, Texas; 99th BW at Andersen AFB and U-Tapao; 22nd BW at March AFB; 43rd SW at Andersen AFB and participated in Linebacker II;, 7th BW at Carswell AFB; 22nd BW at March AFB, 175 combat missions, became a training airframe as a GB-52D and withdrawn from service in 1992.
- 56-0612 – Castle Air Museum at the former Castle AFB, Atwater, California.
- 56-0629 – Barksdale Global Power Museum, Barksdale AFB, Louisiana. It is marked as "0629" and was accepted by the USAF in October 1957 and was operated by the 4258SW at U-Tapao.
- 56-0657 – South Dakota Air and Space Museum, Ellsworth AFB, Rapid City, South Dakota.
- 56-0665 – National Museum of the United States Air Force, Wright-Patterson AFB, Dayton, Ohio.
- 56-0666 – Vertical stabilizer only. National Museum of the Mighty Eighth Air Force in Savannah, Georgia.
- 56-0676 – Armed Forces & Aerospace Museum, Fairchild AFB, Washington. It operated in the Vietnam War and participated in Operation Linebacker II (aka Christmas Bombings), credited as a MiG Killer on 18 December 1972 when tail gunner SSgt Samuel O. Turner downed a MiG-21. Also based with the 96th BW at Dyess AFB, Texas.
- 56-0683 – Whiteman Air Force Base, Missouri.
- 56-0685 – Dyess Linear Air Park, Dyess AFB, Abilene, Texas.

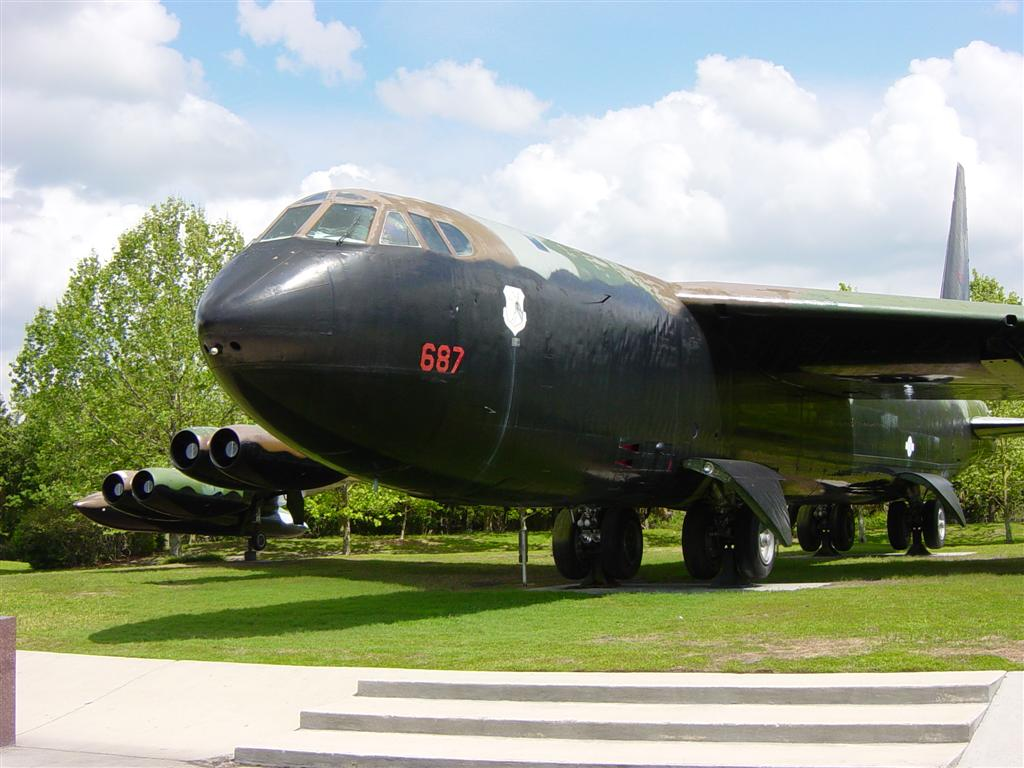
B-52D-40BW 56-0687 at Orlando International Airport / formerly McCoy AFB

- 56-0687 – B-52 Memorial Park, Orlando International Airport (former McCoy AFB), Orlando, Florida. It was operated by the 96th BW at Dyess AFB, Texas.
- 56-0692 – Tinker AFB, Oklahoma City, Oklahoma.
- 56-0695 – Charles B Hall Airpark, Tinker AFB, Oklahoma City, Oklahoma.
- 56-0696 – Travis AFB Heritage Center, Travis Air Force Base, Fairfield, California. It is marked as "Twilight D'Lite".

B-52E

- 57-0101 – forward fuselage displayed at Pearl Harbor Aviation Museum, Honolulu, Hawaii.
- 57-0119 – As with 53-0379, it is located on the Edwards Air Force Base (34.819389, -117.851946) photo range in destroyed condition. It was used in a variety of test roles, most notably as the carrier for the General Electric TF39 engine used on the C-5 Galaxy. It was towed to its present location in 1980, and blown up in 1991 to satisfy conditions of the Strategic Arms Reduction Treaty.

B-52F

- 57-0038 – Joe Davies Heritage Airpark, Air Force Plant 42, Palmdale, California. This is the only preserved B-52F. It was on display at the Oklahoma City Fairgrounds from 1974 to 2006.
- 57-0042 – Only nose and cockpit section preserved. Under restoration to display at Yanks Air Museum, Chino, California.

B-52G

- 57-6468 – Gate guard at Zorinsky Memorial Air Park, Offutt AFB, Bellevue, Nebraska.
- 57-6509 – Barksdale Global Power Museum, Barksdale AFB, Louisiana. It is marked as "6509 Nine O Nine II" and was operated by the 2nd BW at Barksdale AFB and the 801st BW(P) at Moron AB, Spain during Operation Desert Storm.
- 58-0183 – Pima Air & Space Museum adjacent to Davis-Monthan Air Force Base in Tucson, Arizona. It is marked as " 0183 Valkyrie " and was operated by the 2nd BW / 596th BS at Barksdale AFB, assigned in January 1991 to Operation Secret Squirrel, withdrawn from service in July 1991.
- 58-0185 – Air Force Armament Museum at Eglin AFB, Florida. It is marked as "0185 El Lobo II" and first assigned to the 4135th Strategic Wing, Strategic Air Command, Eglin AFB, September 1959; last assigned to the 2nd Bomb Wing, Barksdale AFB, Louisiana.
- 58-0191 – Hill Aerospace Museum at Hill AFB, Utah. It is marked as "0191 Bearin' Arms" and was accepted into service on 16 October 1959 and operated by the 72nd BW at Ramey AFB, Puerto Rico; 456th BW at Beale AFB, California and Andersen AFB, Guam; 17th BW at Andersen AFB, Guam and Robins AFB, Georgia; 2nd BW at Barksdale AFB, Louisiana; 320th BW at Mather AFB, California; 97th BW at Blytheville AFB, Arkansas and Edwards AFB, California; 62nd BW at Fairchild AFB, Washington; 93rd BW at Castle AFB, California; 2nd BW at Barksdale AFB, 93rd BW at Castle AFB, then withdrawn from service in August 1991.
- 58-0200 – On static display at Sheppard Air Force Base, Texas. This aircraft replaced B-52D 56-0589 which had previously been displayed on base from 1991 to 2012 before being broken up.
- 58-0225 – Mohawk Valley B-52 Memorial in Rome, New York. It is marked as "0225 Mohawk Valley" and was operated by the 416th Bomb Wing at the former Griffiss Air Force Base in Rome, New York. The aircraft was damaged by an EF2 tornado on 16 July 2024.
- 59-2577 – Grand Forks Air Force Base, North Dakota.Originally assigned to the 416th Bomb Wing Griffiss AFB Rome, NY prior to transfer to Grand Forks AFB
- 59-2579 – forward fuselage displayed at Tillamook Air Museum, Tillamook, Oregon
- 59-2584 – Museum of Flight in Seattle, Washington.
- 59-2601 – Tactical Air Command Memorial Park, Langley Air Force Base, Virginia.

=== Vietnam ===
The wreckage of a B-52 D or G shot down during Operation Linebacker II is on display at the B-52 Victory Museum, Hanoi.
