= National Museum of the Mighty Eighth Air Force =

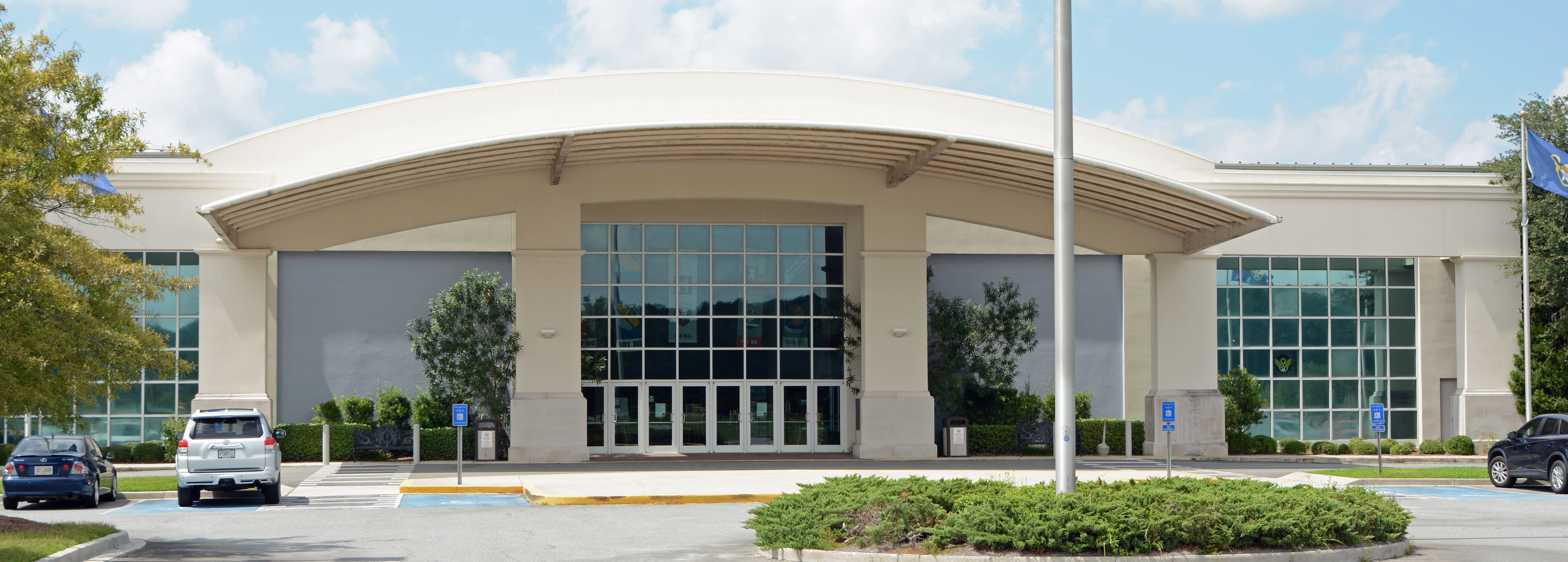

- Location within Georgia Location within the United States
- Established: 14 May 1996
- Location: 175 Bourne Avenue; Pooler, Georgia
- Coordinates: 32°06′56″N 81°14′12″W
- Type: Aviation museum
- Founder: Major General Lewis E. Lyle
- President: Scott Loehr
- Website: mightyeighth.org

The National Museum of the Mighty Eighth Air Force is a non-profit organization with a museum facility located in Pooler, Georgia, in the western suburbs of Savannah. It educates visitors through the use of exhibits, artifacts, archival materials, and stories, most of which are dedicated to the history of the Eighth Air Force of the United States Army Air Corps that served in the European Theatre during World War II.

Among the many World War II exhibits are aircraft including a B-17 Flying Fortress bomber that can be viewed while being restored, a model of a Messerschmitt Bf 109G fighter, and a 3/4-scale model of a P-51 Mustang fighter. Aircraft on display outside include the B-47 Stratojet, MiG-17, and F-4 Phantom II from the post-WWII Cold War era.

== History ==
Planning for a museum dedicated to the Eighth Air Force began in 1983. Thirteen years later, on 14 May 1996, the Mighty Eighth Air Force Museum opened to the public.

A 2003 statute named the museum as the official State of Georgia center for character education. The museum received a B-17 project from the National Air and Space Museum in January 2009. In February 2011, a fire truck that was used at Hunter Army Airfield during World War II was donated to the museum.

The museum changed its name to the National Museum of the Mighty Eighth Air Force in March 2013. (Note: The change was officially recognize by the United States Congress in 2024.)

The museum broke ground on a 20,000 sq ft (1,900 m^{2}) expansion in February 2024. In June 2025, the museum announced that it would be receiving a B-24 from the Barksdale Global Power Museum. A 1902 German boxcar of the type used to transport American prisoners of war during World War II arrived at the museum in August.

== Areas ==
- Major General Lewis E. Lyle Rotunda
- Colonial Group, Inc. Art Gallery
- Miss Sophie's Restaurant
- Museum Gift Store
- Memorial Garden

== Aircraft on display ==
- Boeing B-17G Flying Fortress
- Boeing NTB-47B Stratojet
- Boeing-Stearman N2S-3 Kaydet
- McDonnell Douglas F-4C Phantom II
- Mikoyan-Gurevich MiG-17

== Photos ==
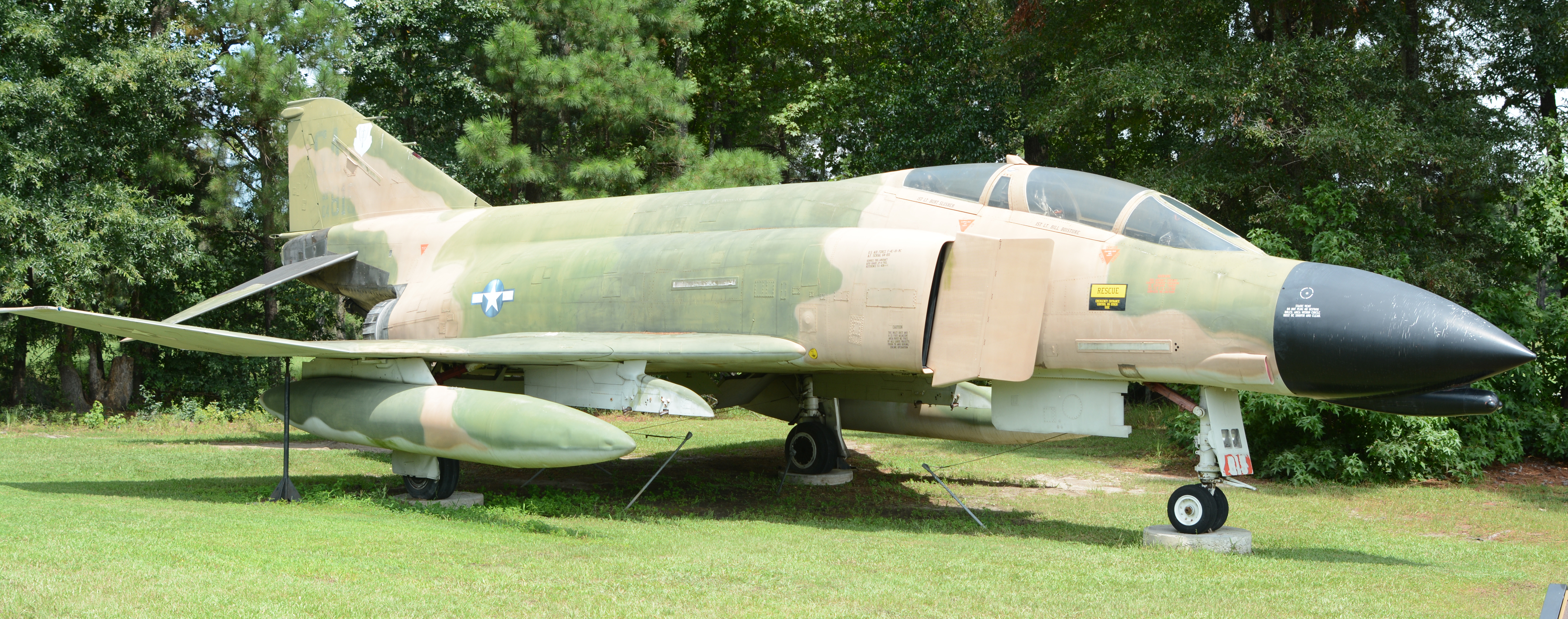
F-4 Phantom II in front of the museum

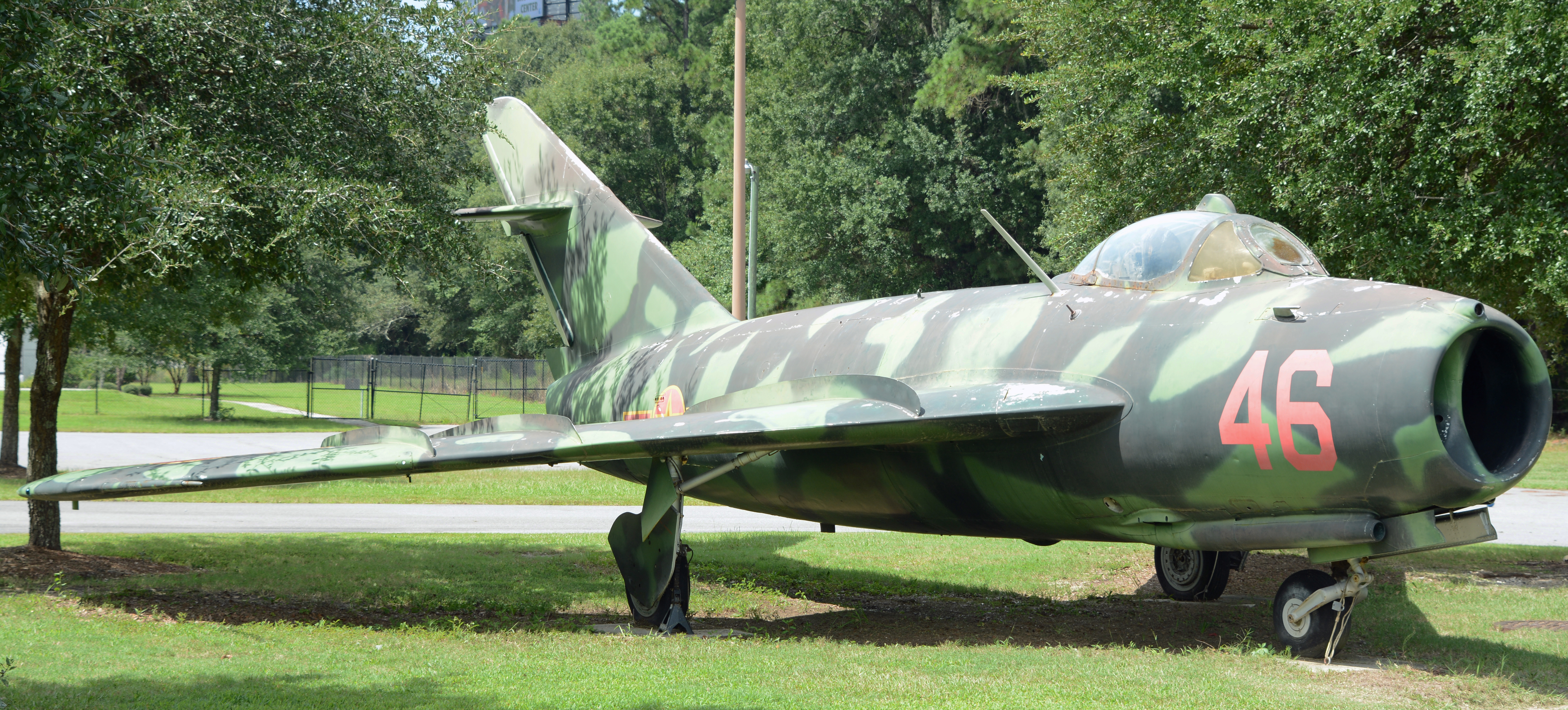
MiG-17 in front of the museum

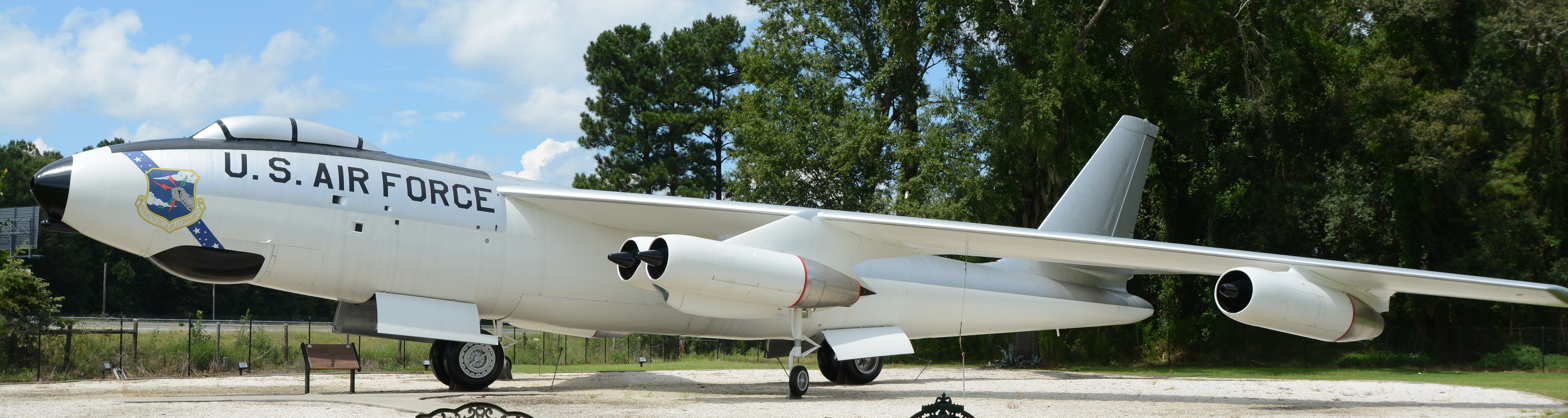
Boeing B-47

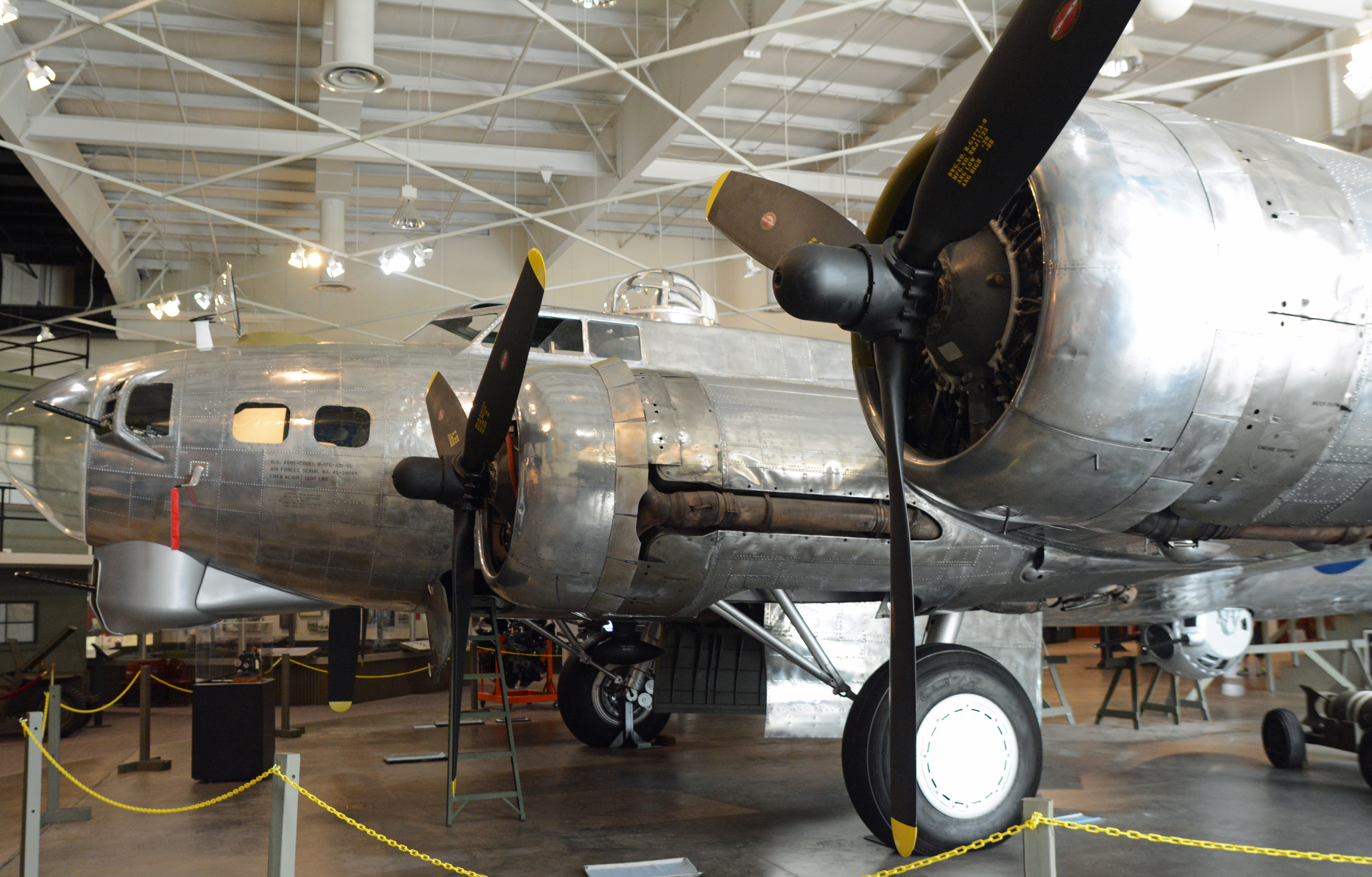
B-17 being restored

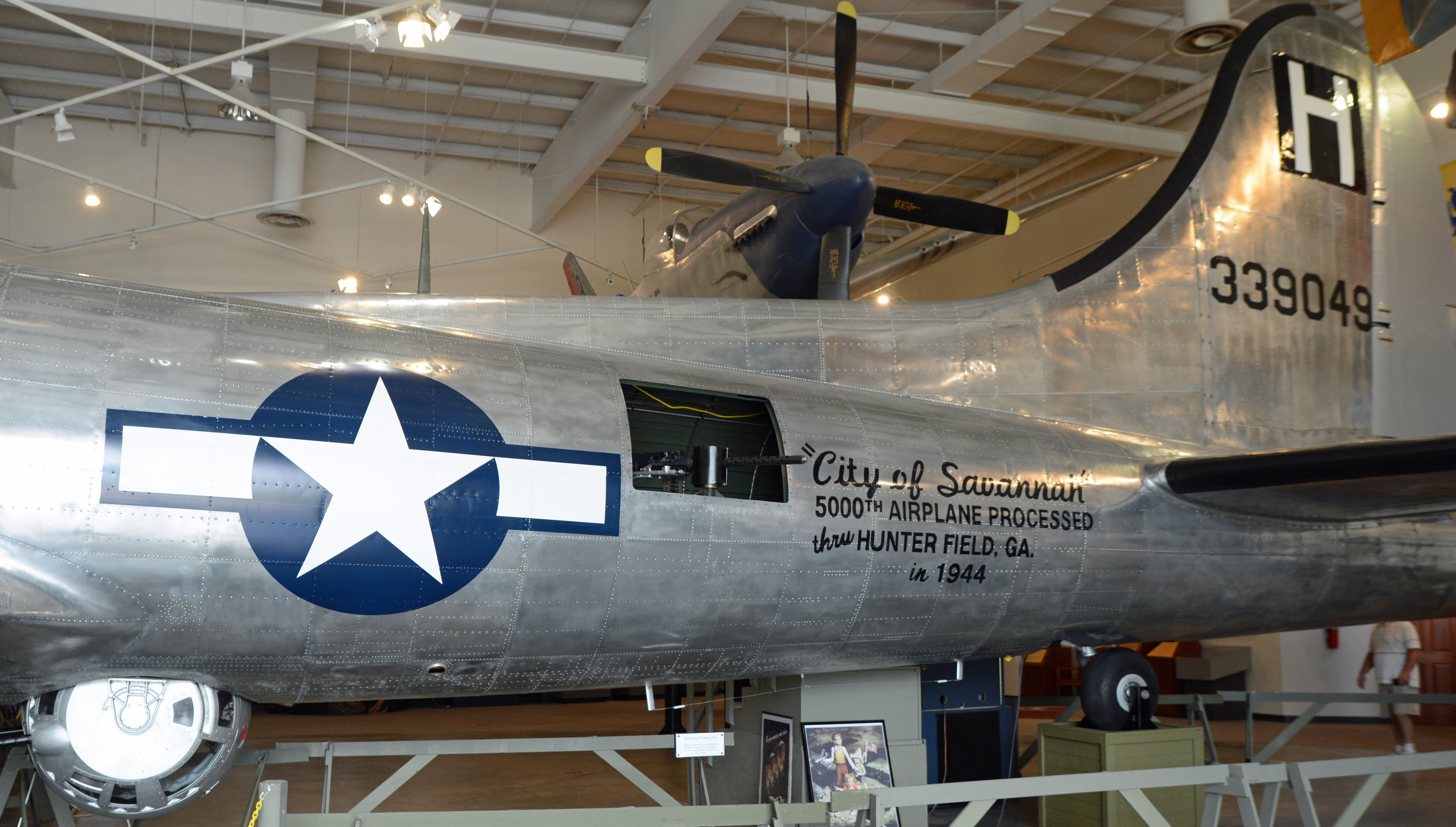
Tail of B-17 being restored

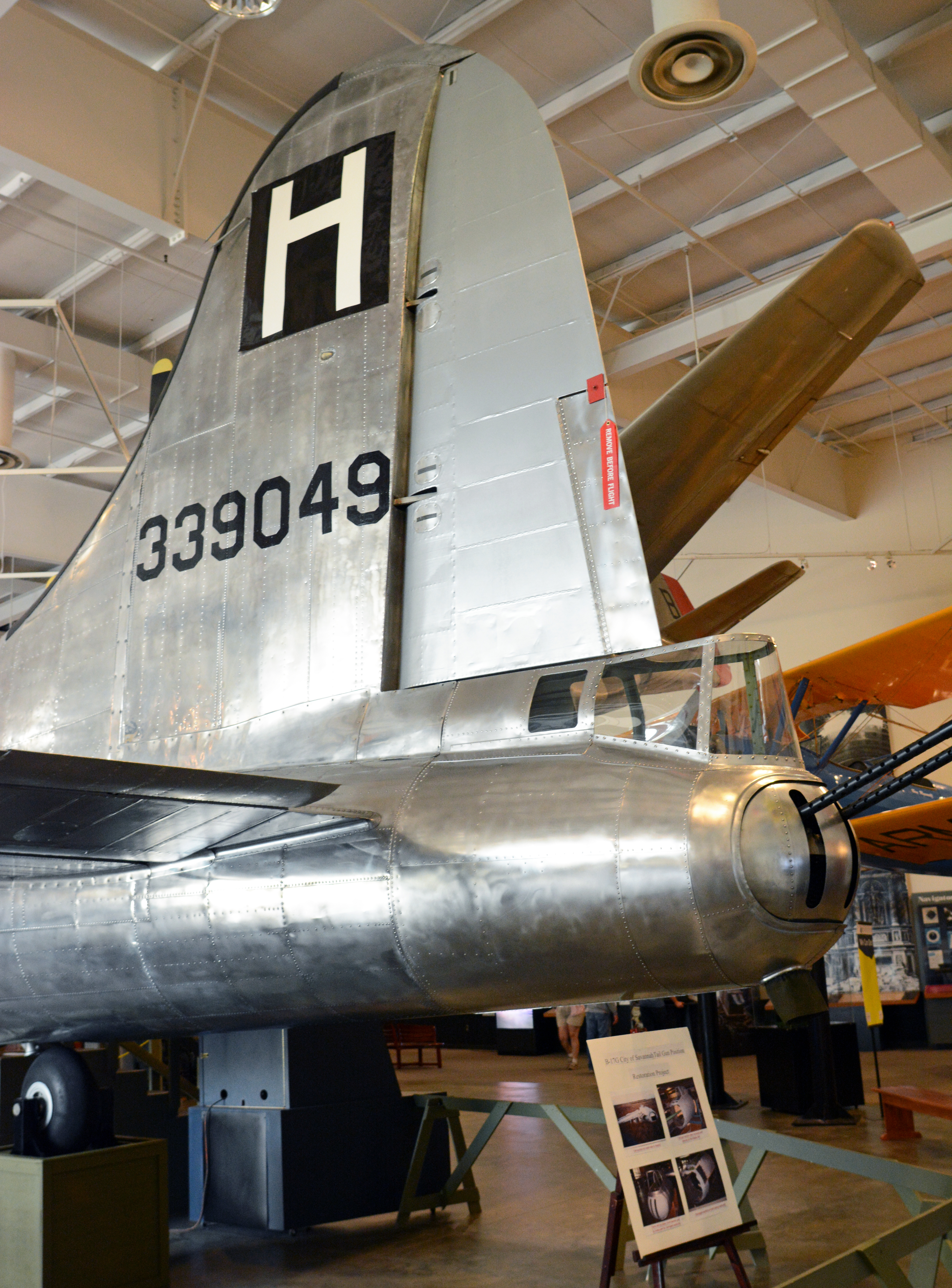
B-17 tail view

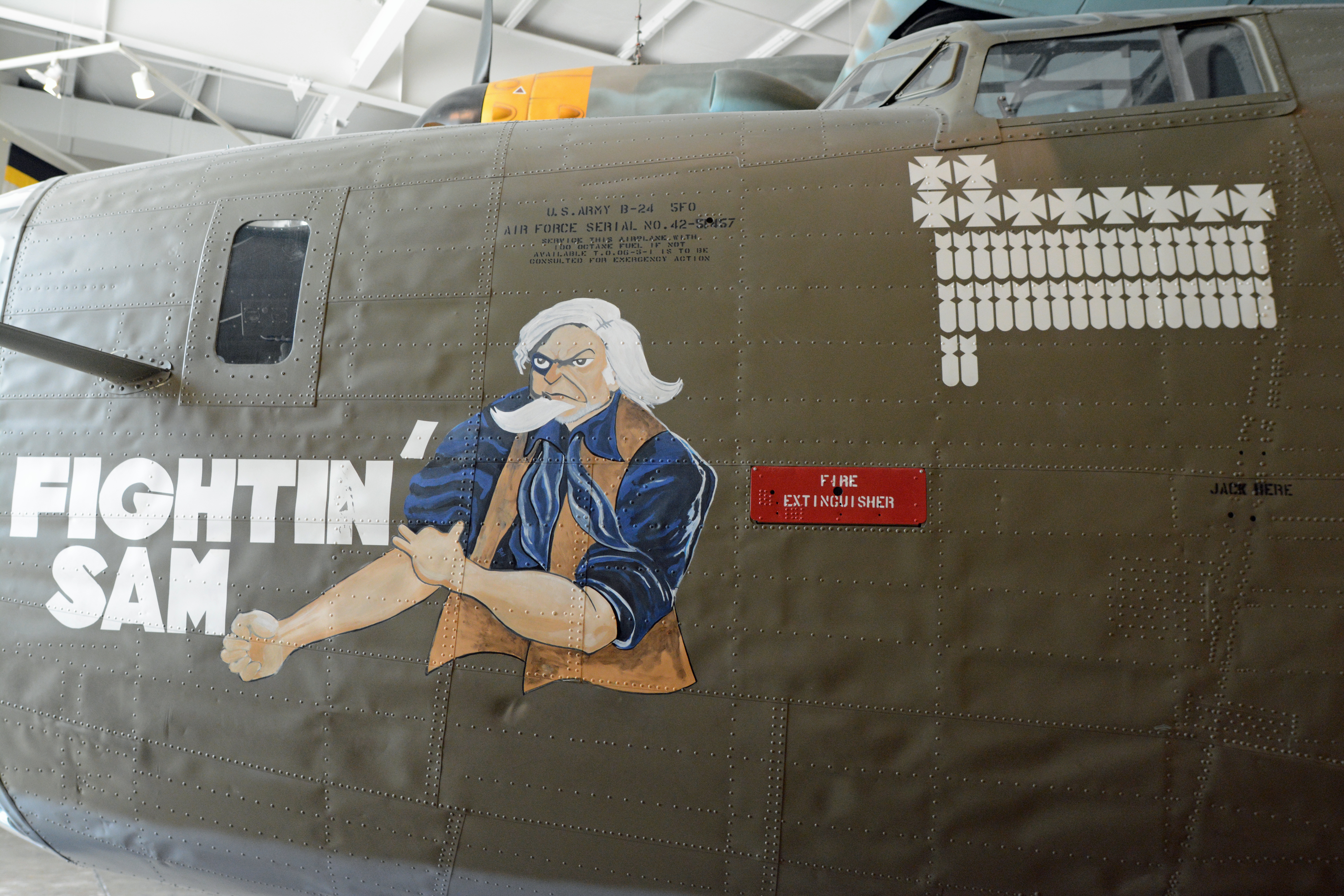
B-24 nose art

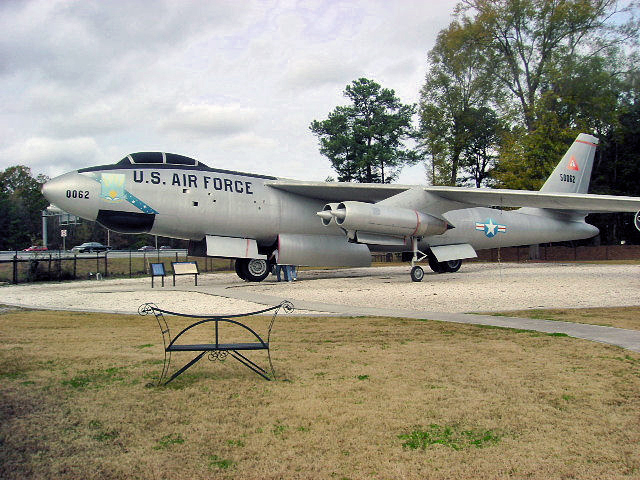
The B-47 before being repainted

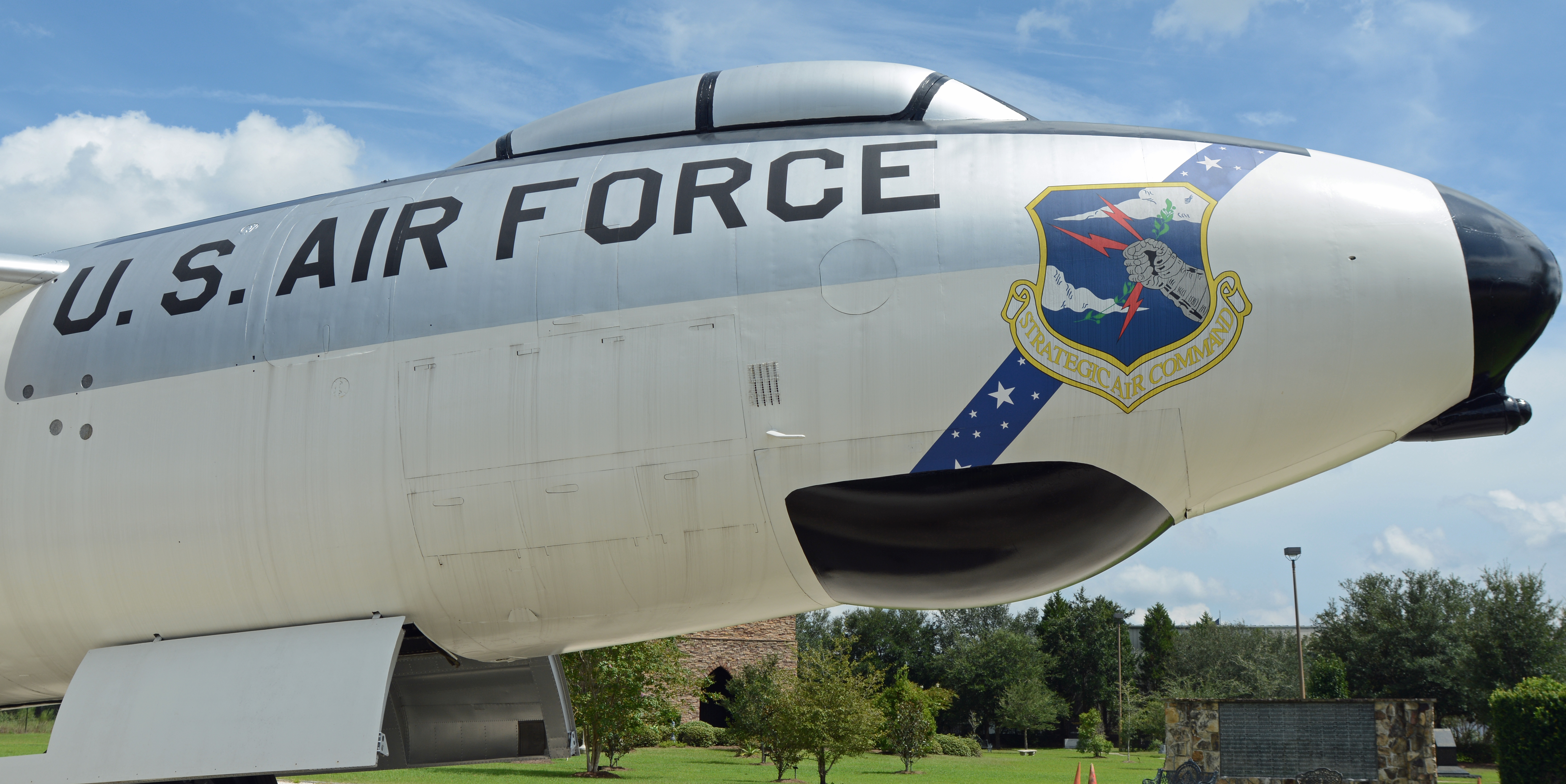
Strategic Air Command logo on the B-47

== See also ==
- List of aerospace museums
