= Barksdale Global Power Museum =

Museum in Louisiana, United States

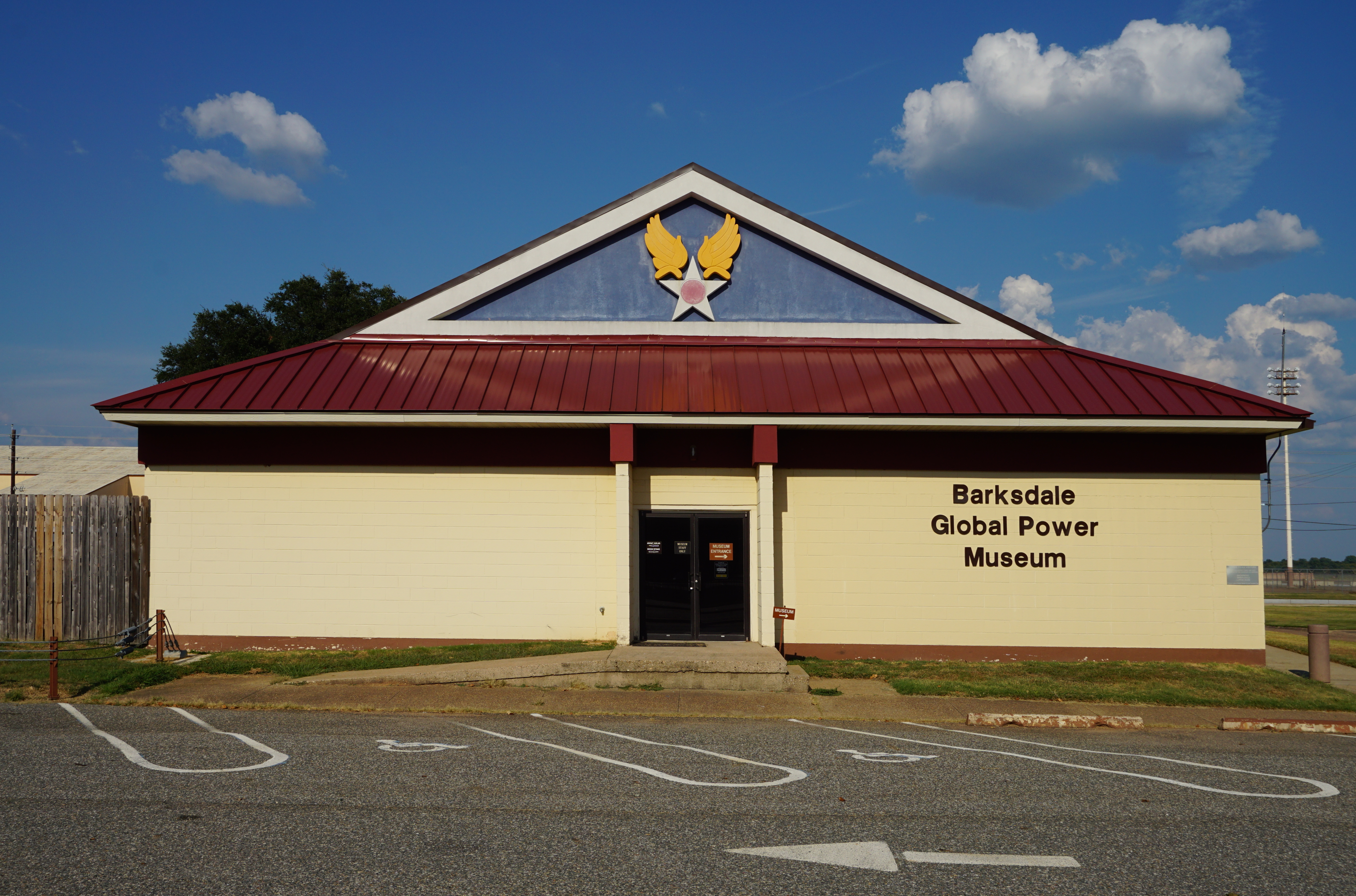
- The exterior of the Barksdale Global Power Museum

- Location within Louisiana
- Former name: 8th Air Force Museum
- Established: 1979
- Location: Barksdale Air Force Base near Bossier City, Louisiana
- Coordinates: 32.510677°N 93.680921°W
- Founder: Harold D. "Buck" Rigg
- Curator: Elizabeth Jan Micaletti
- Website: barksdaleglobalpowermuseum.com

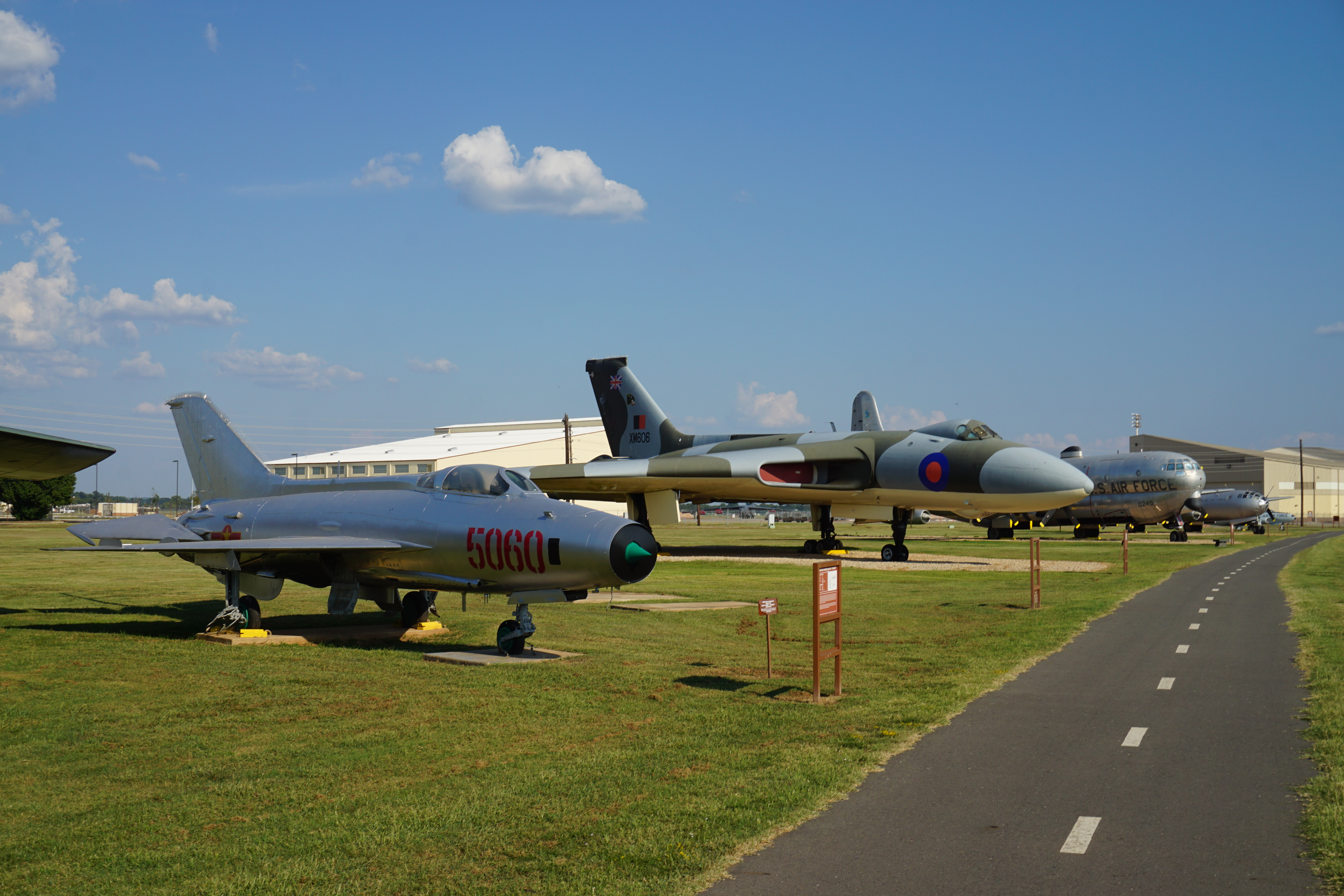
Part of the museum's collection, including a Mikoyan-Gurevich MiG-21F, an Avro Vulcan B.2, a Boeing KC-97G/L Stratofreighter, and a Boeing B-29 Superfortress

The Barksdale Global Power Museum (formerly, the 8th Air Force Museum) is an aviation museum run by the United States Air Force on Barksdale Air Force Base near Bossier City, Louisiana. Hosted by the 2nd Bomb Wing, it maintains a large collection of military aircraft and historical artifacts that illuminate the early days of United States military aviation, the Barksdale base, and the formations of the 2nd Bomb Wing and the 8th Air Force.

The museum aims to preserve the heritage and traditions of the Air Force, particularly those of the 2nd Bomb Wing and other bomber units; to stimulate esprit de corps among Air Force personnel; to educate the public about the Air Force; and to ensure proper stewardship of its aircraft, artifacts, and art.

== History ==
The museum opened in 1979 through the efforts of Buck Rigg, who became the volunteer curator. Work was started to return a B-17 on permanent loan from the United States Air Force Museum to flight. This was followed by restoration of a B-24.

In 1980, two airmen rabbit hunting found the remains of a Keystone B-6A bomber in the woods near the airbase. The wreckage was added to the museum's collection. In 1982, an Avro Vulcan was donated to the museum and later that year plans for recreating a World War II 8th Air Force base were announced. By 1985, the museum had also acquired a B-52, KC-97, C-47, and F-84. A B-29 was added in 1992.

However, an inspection by the National Museum of the United States Air Force in 2008 revealed that collections management procedures were insufficient and the museum was threatened with closure. A rebranding effort led to the museum changing its name in 2012 to become the Barksdale Global Power Museum, to reflect an expanded mission and avoid confusion with the Mighty Eighth Air Force Museum in Savannah, Georgia. The museum completed a three year long renovation in 2015, during which all the rooms were rebuilt and many of the airplanes repainted.

A B-1 arrived at the museum in 2022.

The museum opened a new exhibit about women in the Air Force in June 2024.

In June 2025, it was announced that the museum's B-24 would be moved to the National Museum of the Mighty Eighth Air Force.

== Exhibits ==
- 2nd Bomb Wing history timeline in artifacts from 1918–present
- Aviation art gallery
- A September 11, 2001, exhibit includes the podium and furniture from the Eighth Air Force Headquarters when U.S. President George W. Bush made the first speech during the terrorist attacks.

== Collection ==
=== Aircraft ===
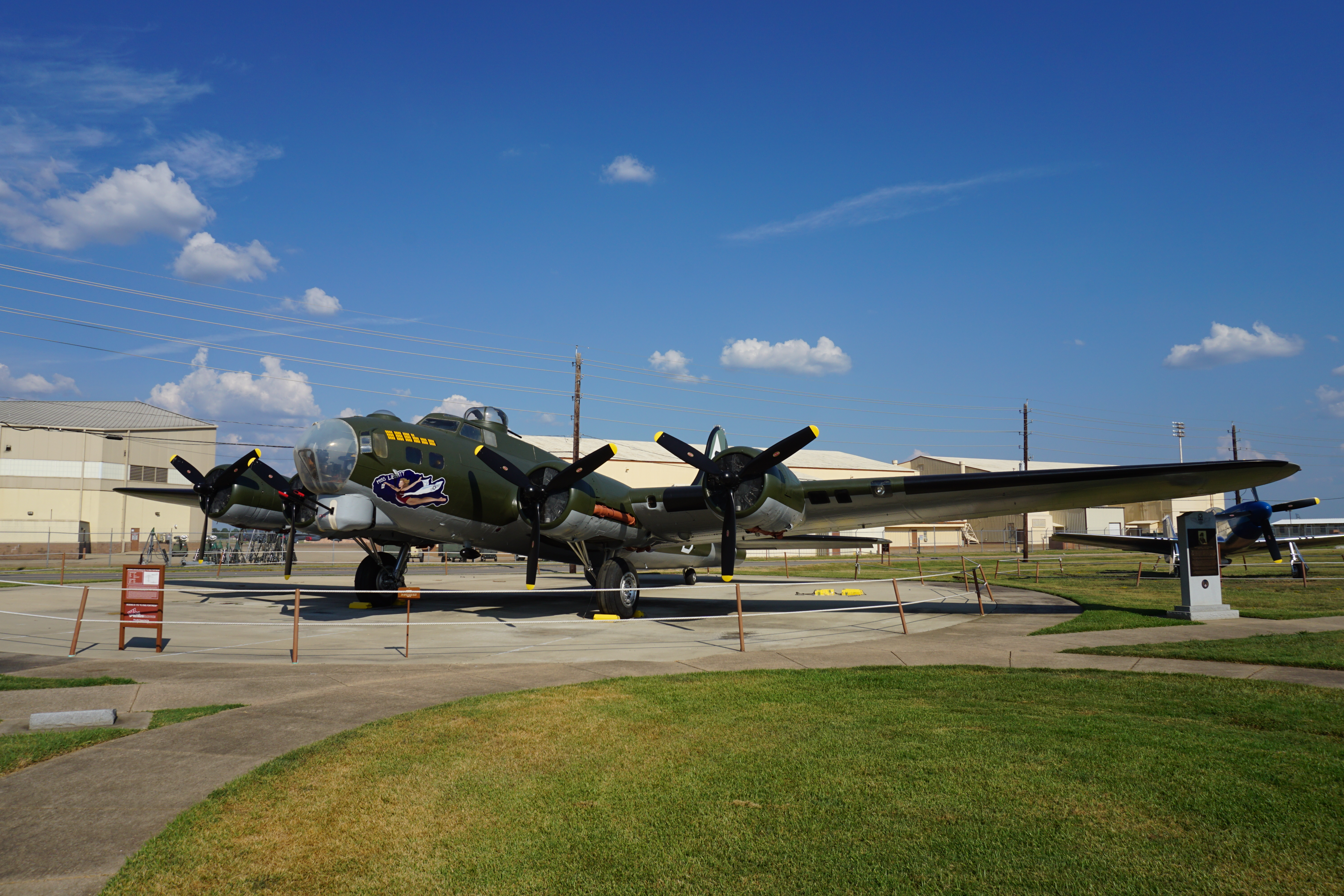
Boeing B-17G Flying Fortress

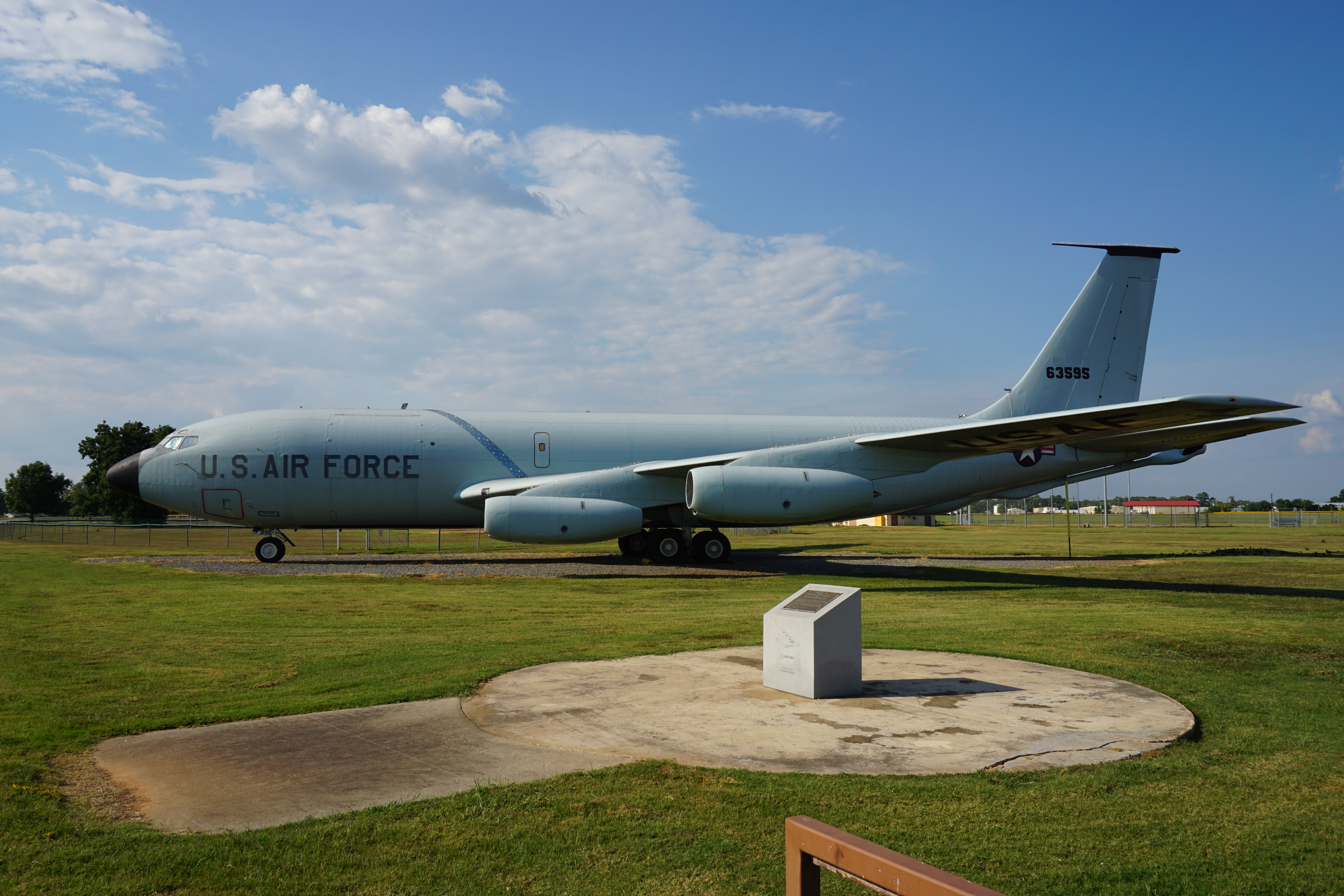
Boeing KC-135A Stratotanker

- Avro Vulcan B.2 XM606
- Beechcraft AT-11 Kansan 42-36887
- Beechcraft UC-45J Expeditor 39266
- Boeing B-47E Stratojet 53-2276
- Boeing B-52D Stratofortress 56-0629
- Boeing B-52G Stratofortress 57-6509
- Boeing KC-97L Stratofreighter 53-240
- Boeing KC-135A Stratotanker 56-3595
- Boeing PB-1W Flying Fortress 77244
- Boeing TB-29 Superfortress 44-87627
- Ford B-24J Liberator 44-48781
- Convair B-58 Hustler – Rocket sled
- Douglas C-47A Skytrain 43-16130
- General Dynamics FB-111A Aardvark 68-0284
- General Dynamics F-111E Aardvark 68-0019 – Escape capsule
- Keystone B-6 – Wreckage
- Lockheed SR-71A Blackbird 61-7967
- Lockheed T-33A 58-0615
- Mikoyan-Gurevich MiG-21F-13
- North American P-51D Mustang Composite
- Republic F-84F Thunderstreak 51-1386

=== Missiles ===
- AGM-28 Hound Dog
- Titan II – Nose cone
