= Half a World Away (miniseries) =

- Television miniseries poster
- Genre: Adventure
- Based on: Half a World Away (story) by Ross Dimsey
- Written by: Michael Brindley
- Screenplay by: Peter Hepworth (treatment)
- Directed by: Marcus Cole
- Starring: Helen Slater; Barry Bostwick; Robert Reynolds; Caroline Goodall; Tim Hughes
- Theme music composer: Peter Sullivan
- Country of origin: Australia
- Original language: English
- No. of episodes: 2 x 2 hours

Production
- Producer: Ross Dimsey
- Cinematography: Chris Davis
- Editor: Ken Tyler
- Running time: 192 minutes
- Production companies: Dimsey Grigsby; Consolidated Productions

Original release
- Network: ABC
- Release: 22 May – 29 May 1991

Half a World Away (also known as The Great Air Race) is a 1991 Australian television miniseries directed by Marcus Cole from an original story by Ross Dimsey, who served as the producer of the series. The international cast included Helen Slater, Robert Reynolds, Caroline Goodall, Tim Hughes and Barry Bostwick. The film was based on the 1934 MacRobertson Air Race. The film was also known as The Great Air Race in video and international versions.

The series is set in 1934. The premise is that a long-distance race becomes open to competitors from all over the globe, as part of the celebrations for the 1934 Centenary of Melbourne. The competitors have to fly from RAF Mildenhall in East Anglia to Flemington Racecourse, Melbourne, approximately 11,300 miles (18,200 km). There are five compulsory stops at Baghdad, Allahabad, Singapore, Darwin and Charleville, Queensland.

== Plot ==
In 1934, the "London to Melbourne Air Race" known as the "MacRobertson Trophy Air Race" named after Sir Macpherson Robertson (James Condon), a wealthy Australian confectionery manufacturer, was announced as a long-distance race open to competitors from all over the globe. As part of the Melbourne Centenary celebrations, the idea of the race was devised by the Lord Mayor of Melbourne with a prize fund of £50,000 put up by Sir Macpherson Robertson.

The race was organised by the Royal Aero Club to fly from RAF Mildenhall in East Anglia to Flemington Racecourse, Melbourne, approximately 11,300 miles (18,200 km). Five compulsory stops at Baghdad, Allahabad, Singapore, Darwin and Charleville, Queensland were scheduled although the competitors could choose their own routes.

In England, two special purpose de Havilland DH.88 Comet racers were built by Geoffrey de Havilland (Robin Bowering) for the teams of Captain Tom Campbell Black (Robert Reynolds) and Flight Lt. C. W. A. Scott (Tim Hughes) as well as the husband and wife team of Jim (Jonathan Hyde) and Amy Mollison (Caroline Goodall). Many other entries from England were production aircraft that could not compete with the Comets.

The other serious contenders were from the United States where celebrity pilots such as Roscoe Turner (Barry Bostwick), Clyde Pangborn (David Arnett) and Jacqueline Cochran (Helen Slater) were entered with potent long-distance racing aircraft. The most unusual entry was from KLM with a Douglas DC-2 airliner that would fly the course as part of a proving flight to establish the efficiency and safety of the airline.

Starting on 20 October 1934, the 20 competitors set off with many dramatic twists. Nearly all the competitors faced some adversity although the KLM crew flying an example of the new generation of American all-metal passenger transports, proved to be dependable, actually finishing second behind only the purpose-built de Havilland DH.88 racer Grosvenor House (G-ACSS) flown by Campbell Black and Scott.

== Cast ==
- Barry Bostwick as Roscoe Turner
- Robert Reynolds as Tom Campbell Black
- Caroline Goodall as Amy Johnson
- Helen Slater as Jacqueline Cochran
- Tim Hughes as Charles Scott
- Jonathan Hyde as Jim Mollison
- Henk Johannes as Koene Dirk Parmentier
- Burt Cooper as Jan Moll
- Gosia Dobrowolska as Thea Rasche
- Gary Day as Ray Parer
- Jeff Truman as Geoff Hemsworth
- Josephine Byrnes as Florence Desmond
- Anthony Hawkins as Thomas Perrin
- Jim Holt as Harold Brook
- Reg Gorman as Race Official (Charleville)
- Rhys Muldoon as Jimmy Melrose
- Robin Bowering as Geoffrey de Havilland
- James Condon as Sir Macpherson Robertson
- Kirk Alexander as RAF Officer (Karachi)
- David Arnett as Clyde Pangborn
- Gus Mercurio as 'Granny' Granville
- Tristan Arniel as French Butler
- Duke Bannister as Wesley Smith
- John Benton as Official (Baghdad)
- Randall Berger as Film Director

== Production ==
Although Half a World Away has a proviso in the end credits indicating that the story is fictionalized, the production closely replicated actual events and depicted individuals involved in MacRobertson Air Race. The aircraft in the film included a North American AT-6 Texan (as a stand-in for the Granville R-6H "Q.E.D."), Avro Anson (portraying the Pangborn/Turner Boeing 247D), Douglas DC-3 (a lookalike for KLM DC-2), DH.83 Fox Moth, DH.82 Tiger Moth and Boeing-Stearman Model 75. A pair of non-flying replica DH.88 Comets were also featured, with "G-ACSS" being taxiable, produced by Monty Armstrong and "G-ACSP", a ground running static created by Ashley Briggs.

== Reception ==
Film Critic Hal Erickson noted: "Enhanced by the utilization of genuine vintage aircraft, 'Half a World Away' originally aired in Australia in May 1991. It has since been released to video as 'The Great Air Race'." In a similar review, Mark Deming commented: "The Great Air Race is a made-for-TV movie that presents a fictionalized version of this thrilling moment in the history of air travel ..."

The film was released as The Great Air Race in a DVD format by BFS Entertainment on 8 August 2000.
