= Carrier Strike Group 6 =

Carrier Strike Group 6 was a United States Navy carrier strike group. Its last homeport was Naval Station Mayport at the mouth of the St. Johns River near Jacksonville, Florida. Fifty-one Rear Admirals served as Commander, Carrier Division/Group/Strike Group 6 from August 1944 until the command was deactivated in April 2007.

== History ==
=== Carrier Division 6 (1944–1973) ===
Carrier Division 6 was formed as an aircraft-carrier-centered command in the Pacific theater during the Second World War. Arthur W. Radford commanded the division in 1944.

On 2 June 1952, USS Wasp (CV-18) relieved Tarawa at Gibraltar and joined Carrier Division 6 in the Mediterranean Sea. After conducting strenuous flight operations, between goodwill visits to many Mediterranean ports, Wasp was relieved at Gibraltar on 5 September by Leyte.

On 1 August 1955, the division consisted of USS Intrepid (CVA-11) and USS Coral Sea (CVA-43) (flagship), both homeported at Norfolk.

In June 1970, then Rear Admiral James L. Holloway III reported aboard Saratoga as Commander, Carrier Division 6. Saratoga was, at the time, in port in Naples, Italy. Holloway served as commander of Carrier Division 6 as well as of Task Force 60 from June 1970 and throughout the Black September crisis in Jordan. Carrier Division 4 relieved Carrier Division 6 on 22 November 1970, and Holloway and his staff returned to Mayport aboard Saratoga.

=== Carrier Group 6 (1973–2004) ===
On 30 June 1973, Carrier Division 6 was redesignated a carrier group, along with all similar formations.

After a brief stop in Palma (24–28 August 1978), USS Forrestal (CV-59) left the Mediterranean en route to the Atlantic and the North and Norwegian Seas, to take part in the huge NATO exercise Northern Wedding (4–18 September). En route she put into Rota to allow RADM Norman K. Green, Commander, Carrier Group 6, to embark, and for RADM Smedberg to disembark and transfer his flag to the guided missile cruiser USS Harry E. Yarnell (CG-17). Northern Wedding involved over 40,000 men and women, 22 submarines, and 800 aircraft from nine NATO countries. Planners geared the exercise to simulate allied abilities to reinforce Western Europe in the event of an East Bloc attack. Forrestal and HMS Ark Royal (R09) led separate task groups that steamed in a two-carrier formation to gain sea control and deploy their aircraft to support amphibious landings in the Shetland Islands and the Jutland Peninsula in Denmark. Heavy seas and high winds, however, curtailed flight operations during the first phase of the exercise, but conditions improved just barely enough in the harsh northern climes to permit the ship and her embarked air wing to support the planned objectives. The professionalism and dedication to completing their tasks which the British and Canadians displayed especially impressed crewmembers, who noted these specific allies' pride in more than one report. Vice Admiral Wesley L. McDonald—Commander, United States Second Fleet—gave a news conference to a group of U. S. and international journalists in the carrier’s "War Room" on the 9th, describing in some detail the significance of the exercise – normally held every four years – in preparing the allies to resist a Soviet-led attack against the West. After completing the exercise the ship returned to the Mediterranean, pausing in the Spanish port of Malaga (22–27 September).

In 1984 the group was based at Mayport and commanded USS Saratoga (CVA-60).

Rear Admiral Leighton W. Smith, Jr. took command of the group in 1986 and deployed with it to the North Arabian Sea, Mediterranean Sea, and North Atlantic.

USS Forrestal (CV-59) and her task force—commanded by Commander, Carrier Group Six—commenced her 21st and final operational deployment on 30 May 1991. During this period she provided air power presence and airborne intelligence support (the airwing flew over 900 sorties over Iraq) to the Combined Joint Task Forces of Operation Provide Comfort enforcing the northern "no-fly zone" in Iraq. During this last deployment Forrestal served in a number of new and innovative battle group and carrier roles. She completed this deployment on 23 December 1991.

In October 1993, after several weeks supporting United Nations peacekeeping efforts in Bosnia, orders came on four hours notice for Carrier Group Six, under Rear Admiral (lower half) Arthur Cebrowski, to move quickly. The group was to transit the Suez Canal and relieve USS Abraham Lincoln (CVN-72) on Groundhog Station, 90 miles north of the equator in the Indian Ocean, supporting UNOSOM II in Somalia. The flagship USS America (CV-66) transited the Suez on 29 October 1993. She was followed, on 1 November, by members of her battle group, USS Simpson (FFG-56) and the replenished oiler USS Savannah (AOR-4). The transit took America over 2,500 miles in a week. The turnover from Abraham Lincoln permitted the west-coast carrier to return to Alameda, California, thereby ending a scheduled six-month deployment on time. Upon arrival, Rear Adm. Cebrowski, as carrier group commander, took command of Naval Battle Force Somalia (CTF 156), supporting efforts to restore order. Other elements of the force included USS Simpson (FFG-56), USS New Orleans (LPH-11), USS Denver (LPD-9), USS Comstock (LSD-45), USS Cayuga (LST-1186), and the 13th Marine Expeditionary Unit.

USS John F. Kennedy (CV-67) appears to have become the group flagship after America retired in 1996.

On 16 February 2002 ships and squadrons of Carrier Group Six successfully completed the second phase of Joint Task Force Exercise (JTFEX) 02-1. Satisfactory completion of the exercise certified the Kennedy Battle Group for deployment. The exercise was conducted in two phases to accommodate pier-side repairs to the carrier during the first phase of the exercise. The exercise took place off the Eastern Seaboard, and at training ranges in North Carolina and Florida.

Carrier Group Six comprised Carrier Air Wing 7 from Oceana, Va.; Mayport-based ships USS Hue City (CG 66), USS Vicksburg (CG 69), USS The Sullivans (DDG 68); and the Norfolk-based fast combat support ship USS Seattle. The remaining ships of the Kennedy Battle Group, all Mayport-based, were to deploy later in the spring. They are: USS Carney (DDG 64), USS Roosevelt (DDG 80), USS Spruance (DD 963), USS Underwood (FFG 36) and USS Taylor (FFG 50). Two attack submarines are also members of the Kennedy Battle Group: USS Toledo (SSN 769), home ported in Groton, Conn., and the Norfolk-based USS Boise (SSN 764).

On 23 September 2002, USS Hue City (CG-66) hosted the change of command ceremony as RADM Donald K. Bullard relieved Rear Admiral Steven J. Tomaszeski as Commander, Carrier Group 6.

=== Carrier Strike Group 6 (2004–2007) ===
It appears that Carrier Group 6 became Carrier Strike Group 6 on 1 October 2004, in common with all other Carrier Group redesignations.

On 20 April 2005, it was announced that:

- Rear Admiral (lower half) Bernard J. McCullough would leave Carrier Strike Group 6 to be assigned as Deputy Director, Surface Warfare Division, N76B, Office of the Chief of Naval Operations, Washington, D.C.
- Rear Adm. (lower half) Richard W. Hunt was being assigned as Commander, Carrier Strike Group 6, Mayport, Fla. Hunt is currently Deputy Director for Strategy and Policy, J5, Joint Staff, Washington, D.C.

The group's final operation was a special shore-duty deployment as Combined Joint Task Force-Horn of Africa (CJTF-HOA) in Djibouti, East Africa, under Rear Admiral Michael Hunt. Michael Hunt was reassigned as Director for Programming (N80) on 16 March 2007.

"More than 60 sailors returned home Thursday [February 22, 2007] after a 12-month assignment with the Combined Joint Task Force-Horn of Africa. The staff of Carrier Strike Group 6, led by Rear Admiral Richard W. Hunt, deployed to Djibouti on February 21, 2006, to fight terrorism and enhance diplomatic ties in the region. Relieving a Marine Corps staff, Carrier Strike Group 6 was the first Navy unit to lead a ground-based task force in the war on terror, Navy officials said."

During its nearly 63 years history at least four group-commanding rear admirals were later promoted to Chief of Naval Operations, the most recent being Admiral James L. Holloway III. For most of its history the group operated as a Task Force Command under the Second or Sixth Fleet’s operational control. Famous attack aircraft carriers assigned to the command include the USS Shangri-La (CVA-38), USS Franklin D. Roosevelt (CVA-42), USS Forrestal (CVA-59), and USS Independence (CV-62).
