= Reeder Nichols =

American military officer and telecommunications engineer (1904–1975)

Reeder Glenn Nichols
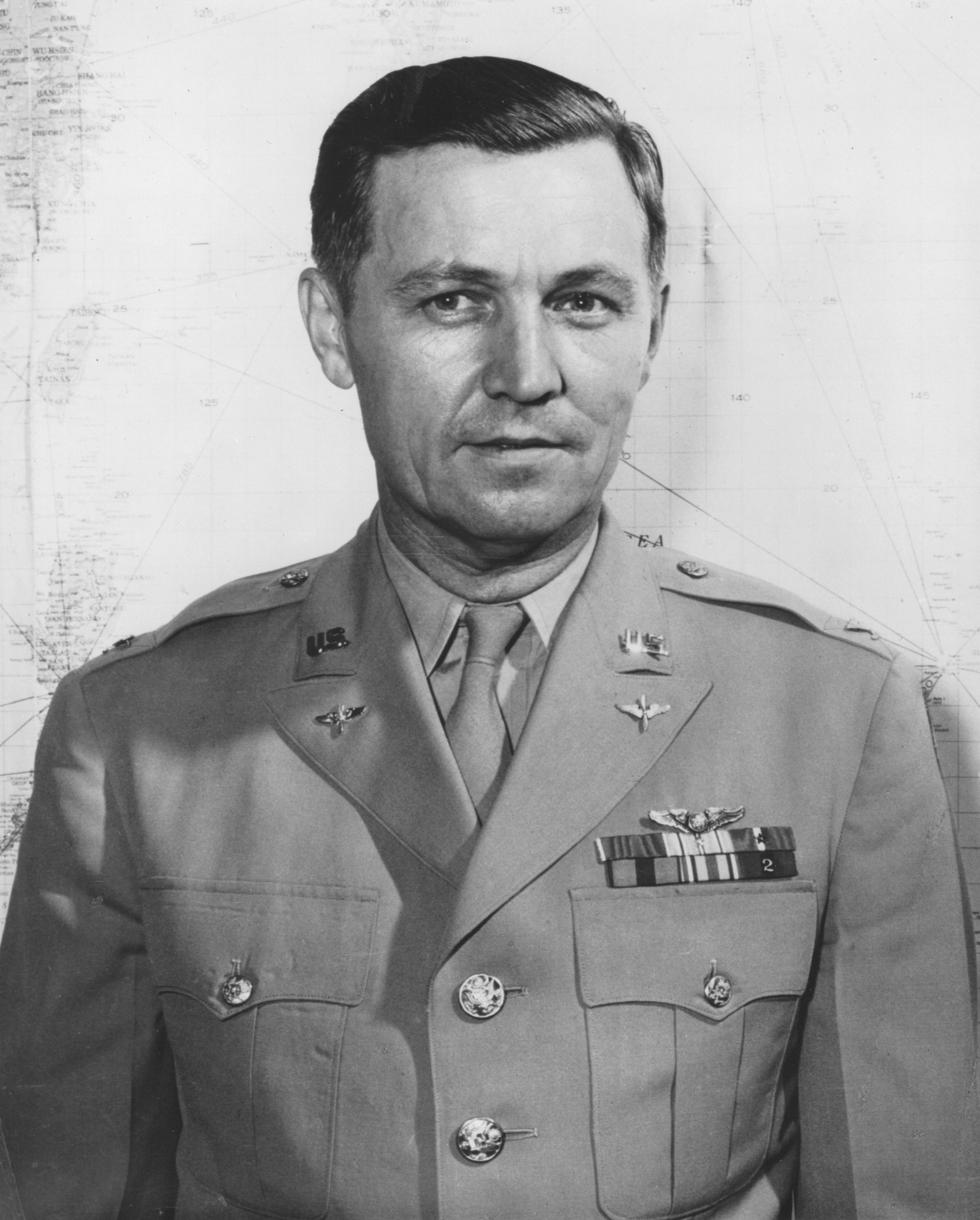
- Press photo of Col Reeder Nichols, August 1945
- Born: February 1, 1904; Florence, Alabama
- Died: May 25, 1975 (aged 71); Sydney, Australia
- Occupations: Military officer, telecommunications engineer

Reeder Nichols (1 February 1904 – 25 May 1975) was an American military officer and telecommunications engineer.

== Early life and education ==
Reeder Glenn Nichols was born on February 1, 1904, to John Martin Nichols and Zether Murphy in Florence, Alabama. At age 16 he left Alabama in search of employment and joined the US Marine Corps, as an enlisted man, at age 19 in 1923.

After service in the Dominican Republic, he joined the crew of the USS Seattle in April 1925 and spent two and a half years on board that ship, as a radio operator under the command of Lieutenant Commander Fred Schnell. The Seattle formed part of the large American fleet that visited Australia and other South Pacific locations in 1925.

In 1928 he was the sole survivor of a Marine Corps aircraft crash near File, Virginia whilst en route to Nicaragua. In August 1929 he left active service in the Marine Corps as a Sergeant.

== Early 1930s ==
Following his Marine Corps service, Nichols worked at Miami for Pan American Airways but left in early 1930 to work with the opposition New York, Rio, and Buenos Aires Line, installing and overseeing the installation of 29 radio stations throughout South America. After a brief period as operations manager for Century Airlines he became involved, in 1932, in a partnership with Bill Lear, Fred Schnell (his former commanding officer) and Warren Knotts, forming Lear Developments Inc. According to Raschke the firm "began building aircraft receivers, in batches of twenty-five, similar to those used by commercial airlines".

== MacRobertson Air Race ==
In late 1932 a group of businessmen in Melbourne, Australia conceived the idea of a London to Melbourne air race to celebrate the centenary of the founding of the latter city in 1934. They convinced the Australian confectionery magnate, Sir Macpherson Robertson to fund the race, offering prize money in two categories, speed and handicap, to placegetters. The famed American aviator Roscoe Turner was interested in participating in the forthcoming MacRobertson Air Race. According to Raschke Turner, who knew Lear, asked the latter to provide a radio receiver-transmitter, intercom and direction finder for the standard Boeing 247 transport he would fly in the race. Nichols and the team at Lear designed the transmitter for the race. The receiver had been developed by the US Navy. Nichols was engaged by Turner as the radio engineer for the race. Clyde Pangborn was engaged by Turner as his co-pilot.

During the course of the race Nichols set records for radio transmission from an aircraft, signaling the North American News Agency whilst over Europe and contacting Singapore via San Francisco whilst approaching the former city, with the Boeing flying on one engine. In addition, his radio equipment proved invaluable whilst the aircraft was lost, in locating, firstly, Allahabad in north India and, secondly, Charleville in Queensland, the latter with the assistance of a Royal Australian Air Force direction finding transmitter. Flying Magazine claimed that "much credit for the achievement must also be given to 'Nick' Nichols, a brilliant young radio engineer who tirelessly worked his direction finders and kept in touch with the entire world during this race". Ultimately the Boeing team reached Melbourne safely in 92 hours and 55 minutes in third place behind the British DH 88 Comet and the Dutch Douglas DC2.

== Late 1930s ==
Following the air race Nichols moved to Ireland for several months in early 1935 to work with Colonel James Fitzmaurice, famed aviator and intended starter in the MacRobertson race. By the end of the 1930s Nichols was Chief of the Radio and Electrical Section of the US Civil Aeronautics Administration. In that capacity he formed part of various crash investigation teams, notably that of the German Zeppelin Hindenburg. He also partnered with Clyde Pangborn again in an attempted trans-Atlantic crossing of Vincent Burnelli's Flying Wing. In addition he participated in the proving flight of the Boeing 314 Yankee Clipper, again across the Atlantic from Baltimore to Ireland. Nichols also authored the Pilots' Radio Manual in 1940, the standard text on the subject for many years.

== World War II ==
In early 1942 Nichols was assigned a direct commission (with the rank of Captain in the USAAF) and ordered to Melbourne, Australia to investigate the radio and electrical needs of Australian airfields. In that capacity he was introduced to General Douglas Macarthur in May 1942. Nichols had travelled from Washington, Macarthur from Bataan. Nichols subsequently travelled back to the US with an Australian engineer to order approximately a quarter billion $ (in 2024 values) worth of equipment, financed under the Lend-Lease Scheme.

Returning to Australia in late 1942 he formed the USAAF's radio group for the South West Pacific Theatre. With various promotions to Colonel his organisation of over 5,000 moved with Major General Akin (Macarthur's Chief Signals Officer) in numerous campaigns, culminating in the Philippines from where he sent, on behalf of General Macarthur, the first signal between the allied powers and the Japanese Emperor, military and government. One hundred and fifty of his troops were the first to land on mainland Japan, at Atsugi Air Base, on 28 August 1945. Nichols was awarded the US Legion of Merit for his organisation's work in establishing LORAN (Long Range Navigation) systems in the South West Pacific. He was further awarded an oak leaf cluster to that decoration for the development of a small, compact transmitter placed in cargo dropped by parachute in the jungle, so that searching parties would be led directly to it.

== Late 1940s ==
Nichols was engaged in late 1945 by Dr Edward P Warner to take up the temporary post as Chief of the Communications Division of the Provisional International Civil Aviation Organization (PICAO), based in Montreal. Following this task, he joined, as a Director, the International Division of Aeronautical Radio Inc, a position which involved considerable international travel.

From early 1947 until June 1949 Nichols returned to co-ordinate the Sydney, Australia Foreign Field Office of the United States Foreign Service. After another short stint with the US CAA, based in Washington, he returned to Sydney in early 1950.

== Life in Australia ==
Nichols spent the remaining twenty-five years of his life in Australia, mostly as a director of various telecommunications firms. These included the Telecommunications Company of Australia (TCA), based in Adelaide from 1954 to 1961, and Standard Telephones and Cables (STC), an ITT subsidiary, based in Sydney from 1962 to 1969. He retained his commission with the US Air Force, retiring as a Brigadier General in 1959. From 1969 he formed his own consultancy firm with heavy involvement in the telecommunications needs of the iron ore industry in Western Australia. For his contributions to the latter, a mountain in Western Australia was named after him.

== Death ==
Nichols died on 24 May 1975. He was survived by his son Jack from his first marriage to Mary Jeanette Pounders and two other sons, Reeder and Martin, from his marriage to Mary Kathleen Connors.
