= MacRobertson Air Race =

1934 air race

MacRobertson Air Race start, finish, and compulsory stops. Aside from stopping at these places, competitors chose their own route

The MacRobertson Trophy Air Race (also known as the London to Melbourne Air Race) took place in October 1934 as part of the Melbourne Centenary celebrations. The race was devised by the Lord Mayor of Melbourne, Sir Harold Gengoult Smith, and the prize money of £15,000 was provided by Sir Macpherson Robertson, a wealthy Australian confectionery manufacturer, on the conditions that the race be named after his MacRobertson confectionery company, and that it was organised to be as safe as possible. A further condition was that a gold medal be awarded to each pilot who completed the course within 16 days.

== Organisation and rules ==
The race was organised by an Air Race Committee, with representatives from the Australian government, aviation, and Melbourne Centenary authorities. The Royal Aero Club oversaw the event. The race ran from RAF Mildenhall in East Anglia to Flemington Racecourse, Melbourne, approximately 11,300 miles (18,200 km). There were five compulsory stops, at Baghdad, Allahabad, Singapore, Darwin, and Charleville, Queensland; otherwise the competitors could choose their own routes. A further 22 optional stops were provided with stocks of fuel and oil provided by Shell and Stanavo. The Royal Aero Club put some effort into persuading the countries along the route to improve the facilities at the stopping points.

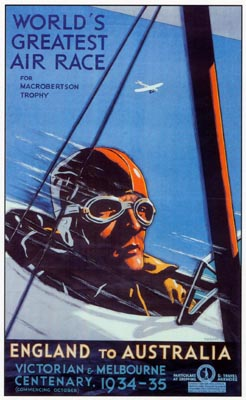
MacRobertson Air Race poster, 1934

The basic rules were: no limit to the size of aircraft or power, no limit to crew size, and no pilot to join the aircraft after it had left England. Aircraft had to carry three days' rations per crew member, floats (e.g. buoyancy aids or personal flotation devices), smoke signals, and efficient instruments. There were prizes for the outright fastest aircraft (£10,000 and a trophy, £1,500 and £500) and for the best performance on a handicap formula (£2000 and £1000) by any aircraft finishing within 16 days.

The start was set at dawn (6:30) on 20 October 1934. By then, the initial field of over 60 had been reduced to 20, including three purpose-built de Havilland DH.88 Comet racers, (Note: G-ACSSGrosvenor House painted red, G-ACSP Black Magic in black and G-ACSR unnamed in green paint) two of the new generation of American all-metal airliners, and a mixture of earlier racers, light transports, and old bombers.

Movietone newsreels coverage of the 1934 race, including Scott's speech.

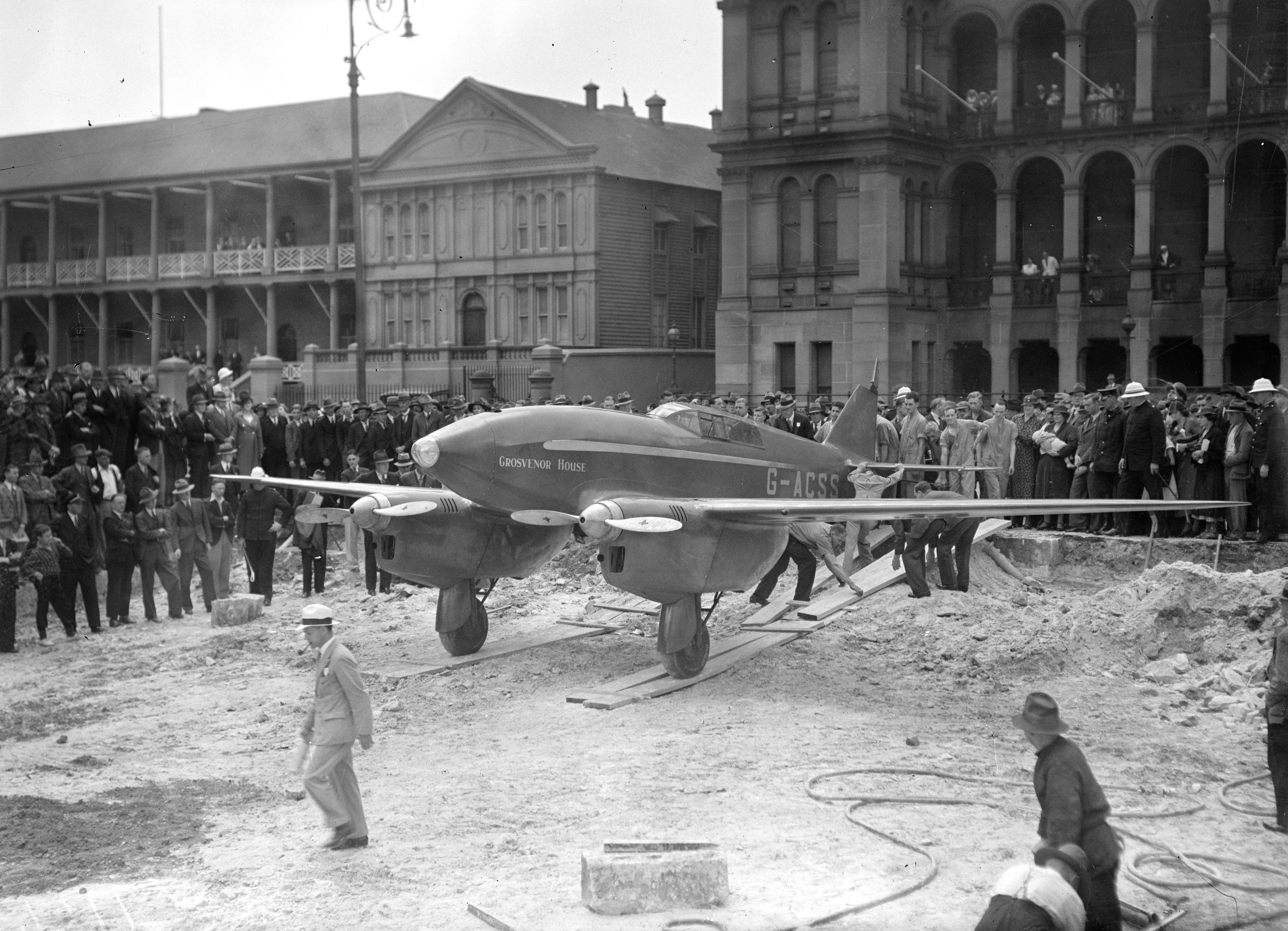
DeHavilland DH.88 Comet, "Grosvenor House" G-ACSS, in Martin Place, Sydney 12 November 1934.

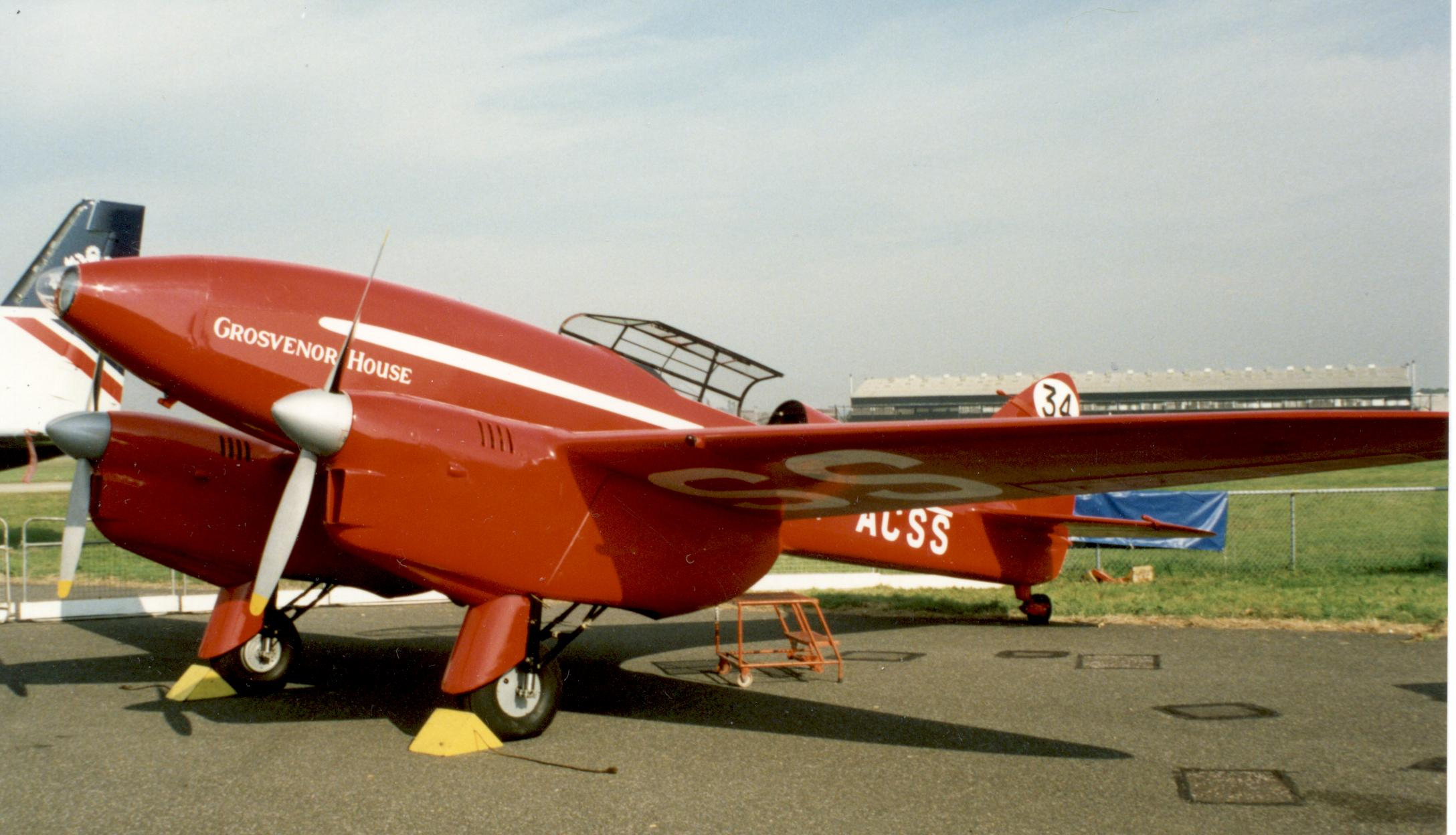
G-ACSS Grosvenor House on display at the Farnborough Air Show in September 1988

First off the line, watched by a crowd of 60,000, were Jim Mollison and his wife Amy Johnson in the Comet Black Magic, and they were early leaders in the race until forced to retire at Allahabad with engine trouble. This left the DH.88 Grosvenor House flown by Flight lieutenant C. W. A. Scott and Captain Tom Campbell Black well ahead of the rest of field, and they went on to win in a time of less than three days, despite flying the last stage with one engine throttled back because of an oil-pressure indicator giving a faulty low reading. They would have also won the handicap prize, but the race rules stipulated that no aircraft could win more than one prize. For their efforts the Royal Aeronautical Society awarded them the silver medal for Aeronautics.

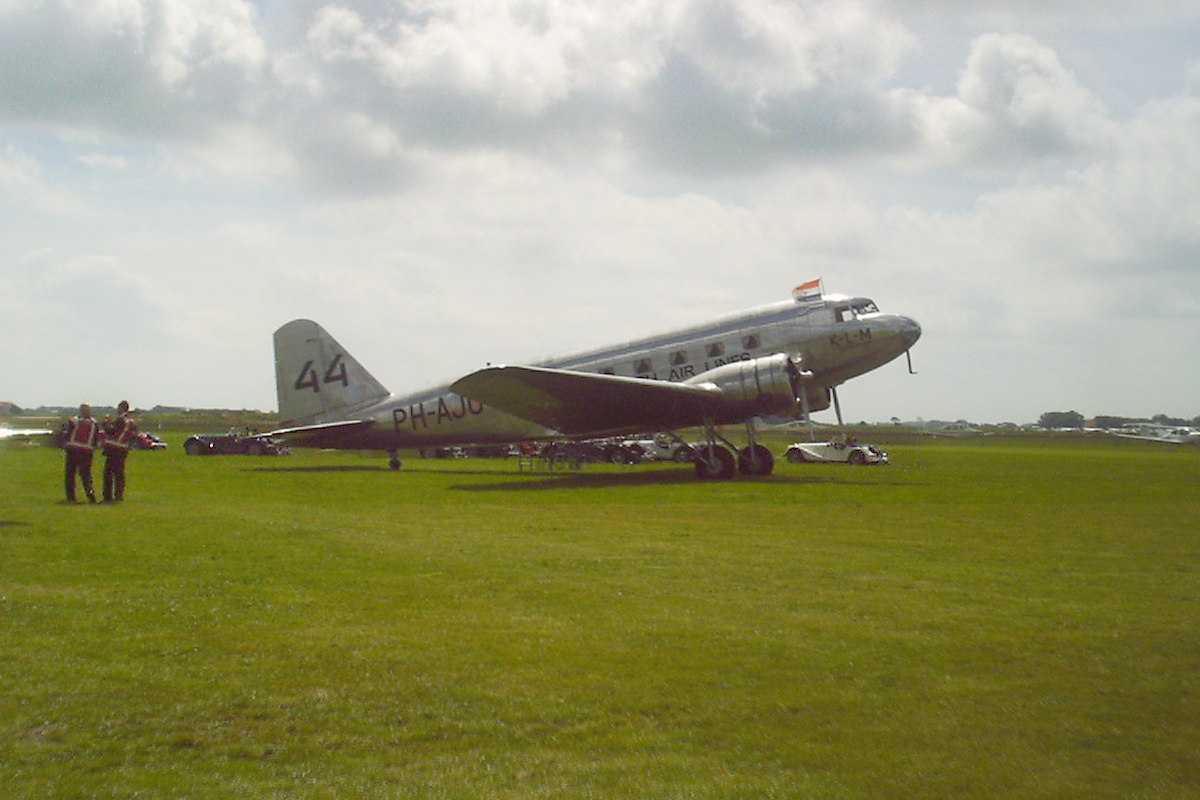
Douglas DC-2 painted to represent the KLM DC-2 PH-AJU Uiver

Significantly, both second and third quickest times were taken by airliners, the KLM Douglas DC-2 PH-AJU Uiver ("Stork") and Roscoe Turner's Boeing 247D. Both completed the course in less than a day more than the winner; KLM's DC-2 was even flying a regular route with passengers.

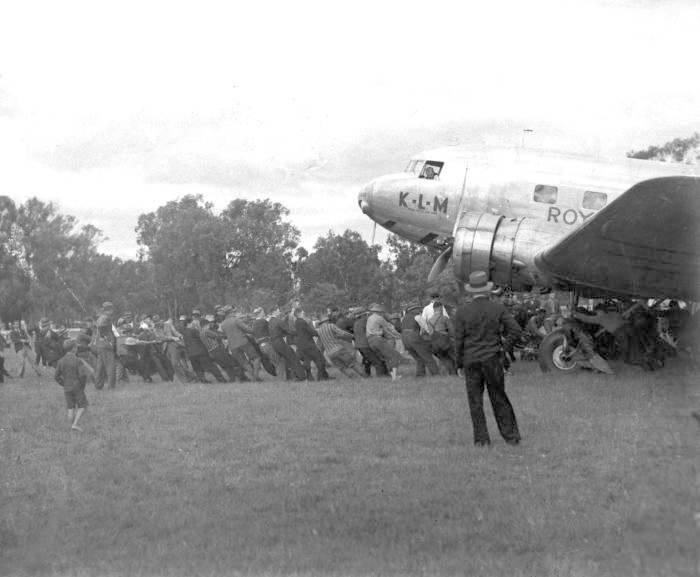
Uiver being pulled out of the mud by Albury residents.

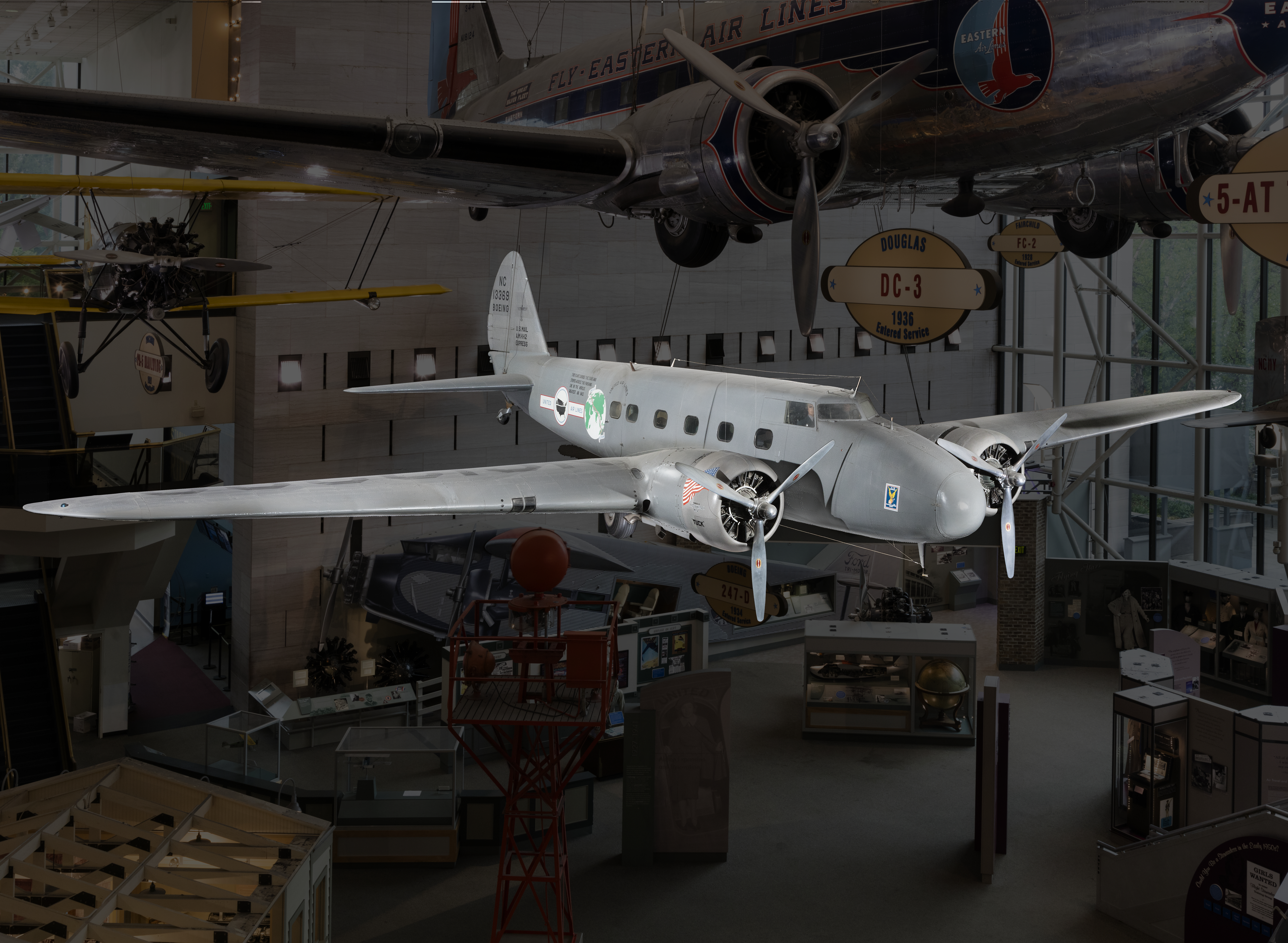
Roscoe Turner's Boeing 247D, the third-place winner, as exhibited today in United Air Lines markings at the National Air and Space Museum.

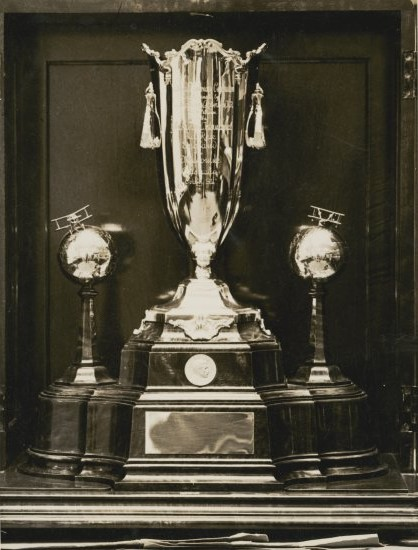
The MacRobertson Air Race Trophy.

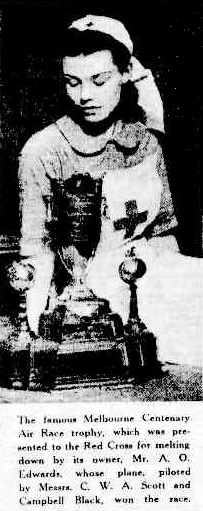
Article in The Sydney Morning Herald, dated 24 January 1941 stating that the trophy was donated to the Red Cross to be melted down for the war effort.

During the race, the Uiver, low on fuel after the crew had become lost when caught in severe thunderstorms, ended up over Albury, New South Wales. Lyle Ferris, the chief electrical engineer of the post office, went to the power station and signalled "A-L-B-U-R-Y" to the aircraft in Morse code by turning the town street lights on and off. Arthur Newnham, the announcer on radio station 2CO Corowa appealed for cars to line up on the racecourse to light up a makeshift runway.

The Uiver landed successfully, and next morning was pulled out of the mud by locals to fly on to Melbourne and win the handicap section of the race, coming second overall. In gratitude KLM made a large donation to Albury District Hospital and Alf Waugh, the Mayor of Albury, was awarded an Officer of the Order of Orange-Nassau.

Later that year the DC-2, on a flight from The Netherlands to Batavia, crashed in the Syrian desert near Rutbah Wells in western Iraq, killing all seven on board; it is commemorated by a flying replica.

Comet G-ACSR promptly flew film of the race back to Britain setting a round trip record of 13 days 6 hr 43 min.

The race was the basis for a 1991 Australian television miniseries The Great Air Race.

== Competitors ==
Official Finishing Order
Aircraft type	Identity	Race No.	Crew	Country of origin	Notes
DH.88 Comet; Grosvenor House	G-ACSS	34	C. W. A. Scott, Tom Campbell Black	United Kingdom	Elapsed time 71 h 0 min Outright Winner
Douglas DC-2; Uiver	PH-AJU	44	K.D. Parmentier, J.J. Moll, B. Prins, C. van Brugge	Netherlands	Elapsed time 90 h 13 min Winner on handicap (Note: The Comet had won the handicap but the rules prevented crews winning more than one prize so the DC-2 received the award)
Boeing 247D; Warner Bros. Comet	NR257Y	5	Roscoe Turner, Clyde Edward Pangborn, Reeder Nichols	United States	Elapsed time 92 h 55 min. Second in speed race.
DH.88 Comet	G-ACSR	19	O. Cathcart Jones, K.F. Waller	United Kingdom	Elapsed time 108 h 13 min. Third in speed race.
Miles M.2F Hawk Major	ZK-ADJ	2	S/Ldr. M. McGregor, H.C. Walker	New Zealand	Elapsed time 7 d 14 h Fastest single-engined
Airspeed AS.5 Courier	G-ACJL	14	S/Ldr. D. Stodart, Sgt. Pilot K. Stodart	United Kingdom	Elapsed time 9 d 18 h
DH.80 Puss Moth; My Hildergarde	VH-UQO	16	C.J. 'Jimmy' Melrose	Australia	Elapsed time 10 d 16 h Second on handicap (Note: As the Boeing 247 had taken the second place in the speed race)
Desoutter Mk.II	OY-DOD	7	Lt. M. Hansen, D. Jensen	Denmark	Arrived 31 October
DH.89 Dragon Rapide; Tainui	ZK-ACO	60	J.D. Hewitt, C.E. Kay, F. Stewart	New Zealand	Arrived 3 November
Not classified
Miles M.3 Falcon	G-ACTM	31	H.L. Brook, Miss E. Lay (passenger)	United Kingdom	Arrived 20 November
Fairey IIIF	G-AABY	15	F/O C.G. Davies, Lt.Cdr. C.N. Hill	United Kingdom	Arrived 24 November
Fairey Fox I	G-ACXO	35	Ray Parer, G. Hemsworth	Australia	Withdrew from race at Paris. Eventually reached Melbourne 13 February 1935
Lambert Monocoupe 145; Baby Ruth	NC501W	33	J.H. Wright, J. Polando Warner	United States	Withdrew at Calcutta
DH.88 Comet; Black Magic	G-ACSP	63	Jim Mollison, Amy Johnson	United Kingdom	From Karachi, Mollison lost his way, and landed at Jubulpur. No high-octane fuel available, filled up with petrol. Engines "burned out" on flight to Allahabad.
Pander S4; Postjager	PH-OST	6	Gerrit Johannes Geysendorffer, D.L. Asjes, P. Pronk	Netherlands	Destroyed in ground collision at Allahabad.
B.A. Eagle; The Spirit of Wm. Shaw & Co Ltd	G-ACVU	47	F/Lt. G. Shaw	United Kingdom	Withdrew at Bushire
Lockheed Vega; Puck	G-ABGK	36	J. Woods, D.C. Bennett	Australia	Overturned on landing at Aleppo, withdrew
Airspeed AS.8 Viceroy	G-ACMU	58	T. Neville Stack, S.L. Turner	United Kingdom	Withdrew with multiple mechanical issues at Athens
Granville Gee Bee R-6H; Q.E.D.	NX14307	46	Jacqueline Cochran, W. Smith Pratt	United States	Withdrew with malfunctioning flaps after landing damage at Bucharest
Fairey Fox I	G-ACXX	62	H.D. Gilman, J.K. Baines	United Kingdom	Crashed near Palazzo San Gervasio in Italy; both crew killed

== See also ==
- England to Australia flight
