= Roscoe Turner =

20th-century American aviator

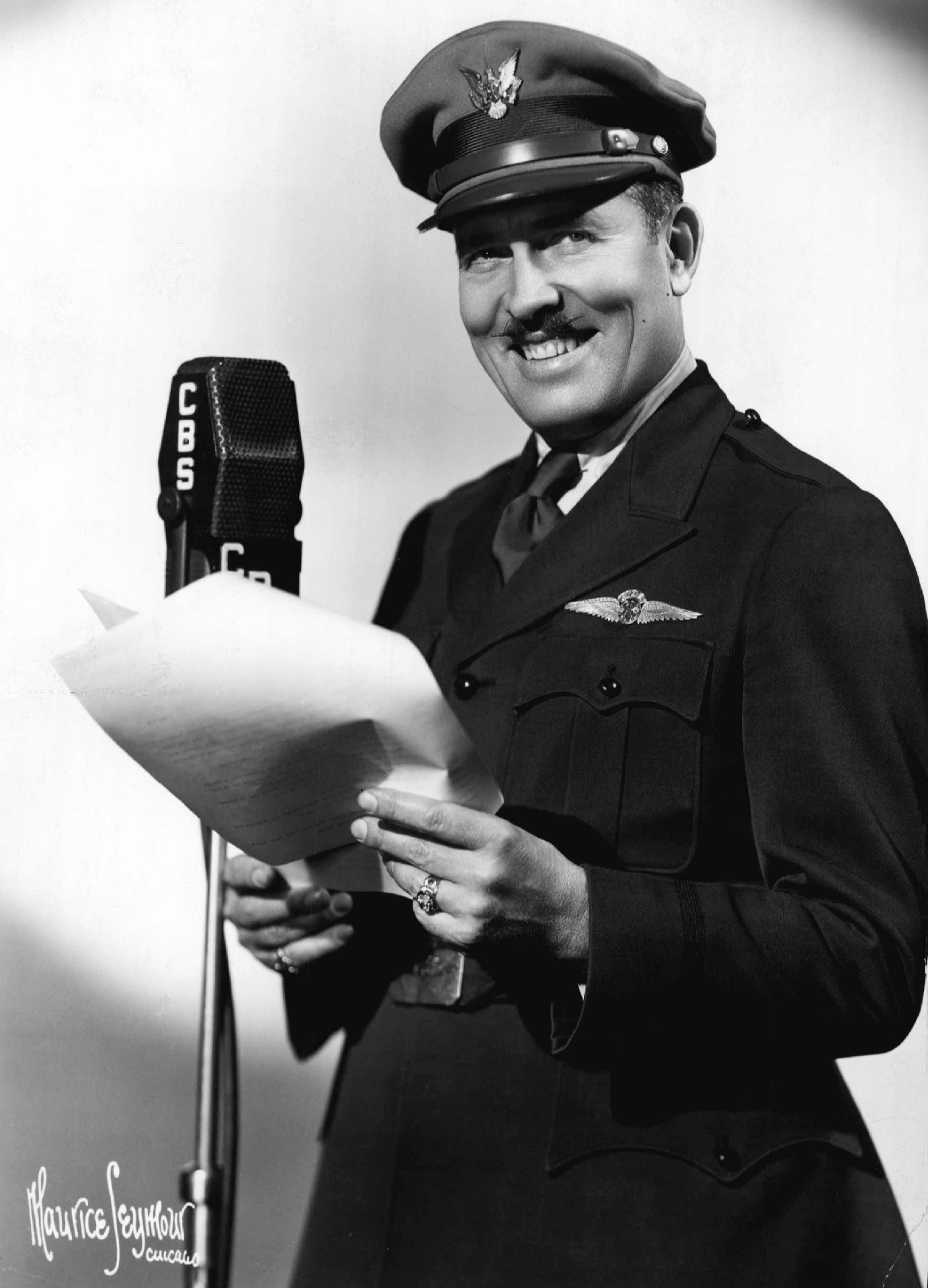
- Turner as narrator on the "Sky Blazers", 1940
- Born: September 29, 1895; Corinth, Mississippi, U.S.
- Died: June 23, 1970 (aged 74); Indianapolis, Indiana, U.S.
- Resting place: Crown Hill Cemetery and Aboretum, Community Mausoleum, 2KK-D-10; 39.8274766°N 86.1730061°W
- Known for: Flight at Midnight
- Spouses: Carline Stovall (m. 1924–1946) Margaret Madonna Miller (m. 1946)
- Awards: Harmon Trophy (1933, 1939); National Aviation Hall of Fame (1975); Motorsports Hall of Fame of America (1991)
- Aviation career
- Famous flights: Transcontinental airspeed record New York to Los Angeles (1930, 1932); Transcontinental airspeed record Los Angeles to New York (1933); MacRobertson Air Race (1934); Bendix Trophy (1933); Thompson Trophy (1934, 1938, 1939)
- Military service
- Allegiance: United States
- Branch: United States Army
- Service years: 1917–1919
- Rank: First Lieutenant
- Conflicts: World War I
- Awards: Distinguished Flying Cross; See more

Roscoe Turner (September 29, 1895 – June 23, 1970) was a record-breaking American aviator who was a three-time winner of the Thompson Trophy air race and widely recognized by his flamboyant style and his pet, Gilmore the Lion. He also founded a US domestic airline, ultimately called Lake Central Airlines, that in 1968 merged into Allegheny Airlines, the predecessor to US Airways.

== Early life ==
Roscoe Turner was born in Corinth, Mississippi, the eldest son of farmer Robert Lee Turner and his wife Mary Aquilla Derryberry Turner. From 1903 to 1910, he attended the Glover School in West Corinth, and his formal education reached the tenth grade, the highest available there. He came to realize that he did not want to be a farmer, and daydreamed of a future on the railroad that ran through the family farm. He developed interests and skills in repairing, constructing and experimenting with mechanical objects, including horse-drawn wagons, large kites, motorcycles, and eventually, automobiles. He studied at business college for about six months, then worked in a hardware store, and briefly at a local bank, in the occupation then preferred by his father.

At age 16, he moved to Memphis, Tennessee in the hope of being an automobile mechanic, but had to take a job as a dispatch clerk. A truck driver befriended him, helping him with driving and navigating the local area, allowing him to gain employment as a driver. He attributed his success at interviews to meticulous preparation of his clothing and appearance, an ethos that characterized the rest of his life. He then worked at various jobs, including automobile mechanic, chauffeur and salesman, often coincidentally. He first saw an aircraft in 1913, and in 1916 decided to become a pilot. He applied to the Army for flying training, but despite having mechanical expertise and driving experience, he lacked the required college education.

== World War I ==
After America entered World War I in April 1917, Turner enlisted as an ambulance driver. Within months, he was promoted from private to sergeant first class. In January 1918 he was accepted as a Flying Cadet and trained as a balloon pilot. In March 1918, he was commissioned as a second lieutenant in the Signal Corps Reserve. In September 1918, he departed the U.S. to serve in France and Germany, where he gained some unofficial flying training in fixed wing aircraft. In July 1919, he returned to the U.S. as a First Lieutenant, and was discharged in September 1919. After the war he became a member of the American Legion. Turner was also a member of the Forty and Eight, the Freemasons, and the Shriners.

== Barnstorming ==
In October 1919, Turner went into partnership with Harry J. Runser, who had already been barnstorming with a Canuck biplane, a Canadian version of the Curtiss JN-4 Jenny, and who needed someone to act as mechanic, wing-walker and parachutist. Together, they toured eastern and southern states with their passenger joyriding flights and displays of stunts that included posed aircraft crashes. They wore Army–style uniforms, and Turner developed his own design of tailor-made uniform of blue tunic (similar to those worn by officers of the Royal Air Force), fawn jodhpurs, riding boots and a beige officer cap. He added a silver winged brooch of his own design with the monogram "RT" in the center, a fancy belt, and grew a waxed mustache to accentuate his toothy smile. In later life, he maintained that his carefully contrived appearance was both practical and good for business, but that he grew to dislike wearing the uniform.

In April 1920, Turner and Runser sold the Curtiss Jenny and purchased an Avro 504 that could carry two passengers. In September 1921 they sold the Avro 504 and 'purchased' a Curtiss Jenny from a Marine sergeant. In February 1922, Turner and Runser were charged with conspiracy and receiving stolen government property. They both pleaded guilty, and were sentenced to a year and a day in federal prison. Turner was released on parole in July 1922, and in August 1924 he was granted a full and unconditional pardon by U.S. President Calvin Coolidge. He returned to Corinth, and formed an automobile repair business with a partner. He repaired and restored a Curtiss Jenny, improved his flying skills, and barnstormed in the Corinth area. In the fall of 1924 he joined with Arthur H. Starnes to form the Roscoe Turner Flying Circus. They used a Standard J-1 nicknamed an 'OX Standard' (for its Curtiss OXX-6 engine), later joined by a Breguet 14.

In 1923 in Sheffield, Alabama, he formed the Muscle Shoals Aircraft Corporation to promote aviation and other business in the Sheffield area, but his continuing automobile business in Corinth, and barnstorming with Arthur Starnes, were more successful. On his birthday in 1924, he married Carline Hunter Stovall at the farm near Corinth where he kept his aircraft. The couple were seated in his aircraft with the minister officiating while standing alongside. Turner wore his display uniform, and publicity was later obtained from the event. In 1925, after Starnes left to pursue his own barnstorming ambitions, Turner employed J. W. 'Bugs' Fisher as his wing–walker, stuntman and parachutist.

== Airlines and Hollywood ==
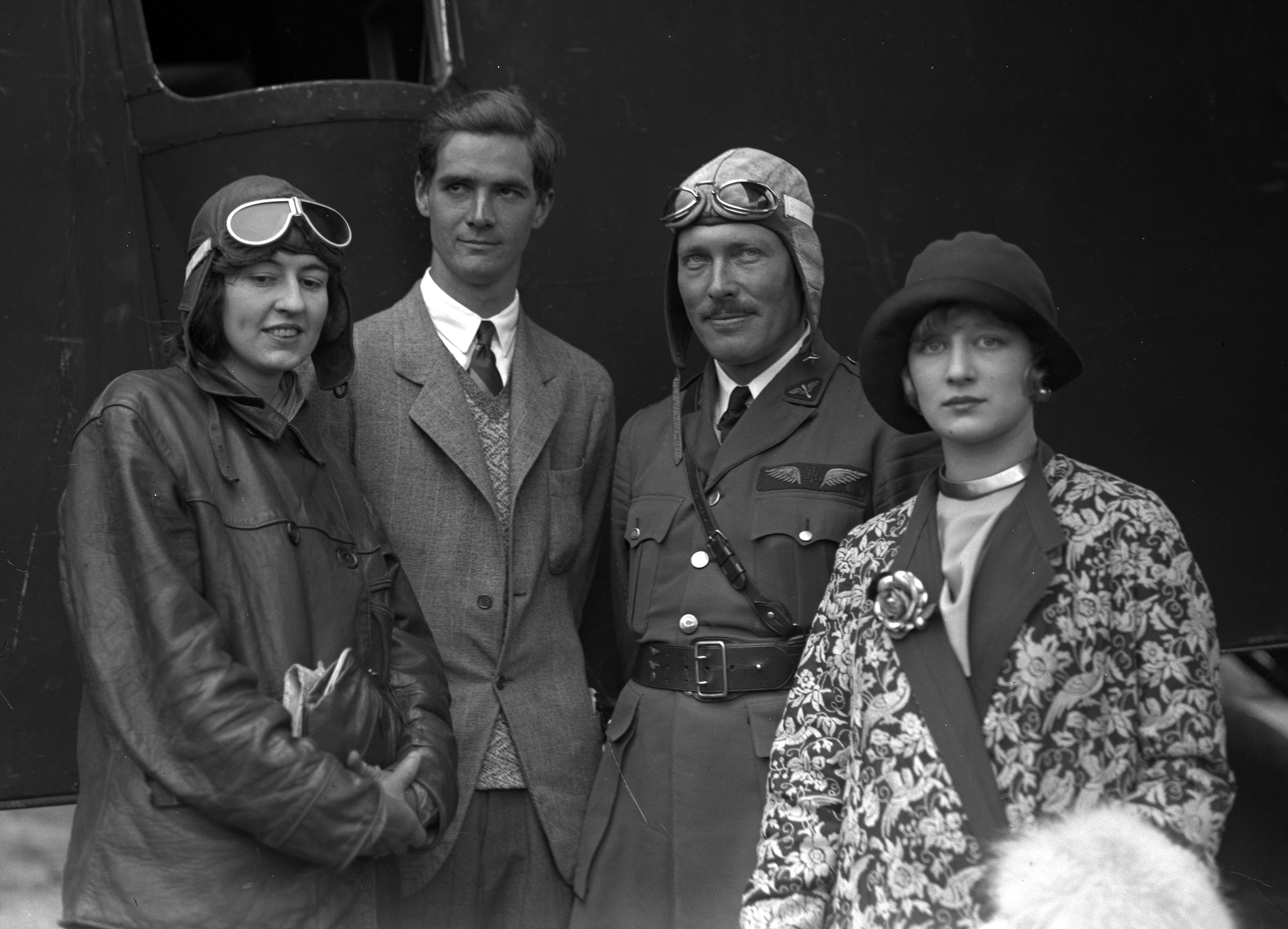
Turner with his wife Carline Stovall, business magnate Howard Hughes and actress Greta Nissen, circa 1928

In early 1925, via a lease purchase agreement, and with sponsorship of the Curlee Clothing Company, The Roscoe Turner Aeronautical Corporation acquired the sole Sikorsky S-29-A, a twin-engine biplane with enclosed cabin for about 16 passengers plus open cockpit for the pilot. Turner used the aircraft through 1927 for commercial charters, publicity campaigns, passenger joy-riding and proposed record-breaking flights. In early 1928, Turner flew the S-29-A to California, for its conversion to a representation of a German Gotha bomber, under a lease agreement with film company Caddo Productions that was controlled by Howard Hughes. Caddo used the aircraft in Hughes' movie Hell's Angels (1930), often piloted by Turner. While being flown by another pilot during its final filmed stunt, it suffered an inflight failure and crashed with one fatality, after the pilot parachuted from the aircraft.

During this period, around 1928, Turner and his wife Carline became involved in Hollywood society, including movie executives, politicians and famous actors, all combined with aviation and publicity for all concerned. After failed attempts to break records for air endurance and altitude, he conducted successful experiments with the Russell Parachute Company to safely recover whole aircraft and their contents by parachute. That technique went largely unadopted until Ballistic Recovery Systems developed it further, 50 years later. In early 1929, Turner became chief pilot for Nevada Airlines, flying Lockheed Vegas on regular services between Los Angeles, Bishop, Tonopah, Reno and Las Vegas, to enable people to take advantage of Nevada laws on gambling, marriage and divorce. The first Vega was christened Alimony Special by Bebe Daniels.

== Air racing ==
At the 1928 National Air Races, Turner started air racing, in a Timm Aircoach sponsored by Shell Oil Company, and at the 1929 event he raced a Lockheed Vega (NC7954) of Nevada Airlines. On August 21, 1929, Turner made his first attempt to beat the two transcontinental airspeed records set by Frank Hawks. He piloted a Lockheed Vega of Nevada Airlines, with Harold Gatty as navigator, plus two passengers. The flights failed to break the records, but brought publicity for Turner, Nevada Airlines, and the concept of transcontinental passenger services. Later that month, Governor of Nevada, Fred B. Balzar, appointed Turner to his staff as a military aide de camp with the rank of lieutenant colonel, and Governor of California James Rolph then did likewise. From then and for the rest of his life, Turner adopted the title of "Colonel" in all his public activities. However, Nevada Airlines failed to achieve enough viable services, and ceased operations in February 1930.

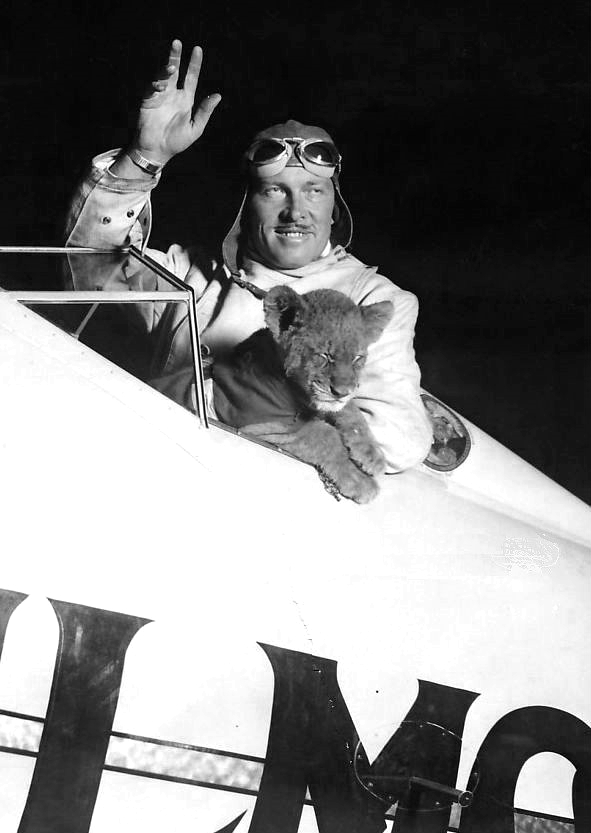
Roscoe Turner, and Gilmore as a cub (1930)

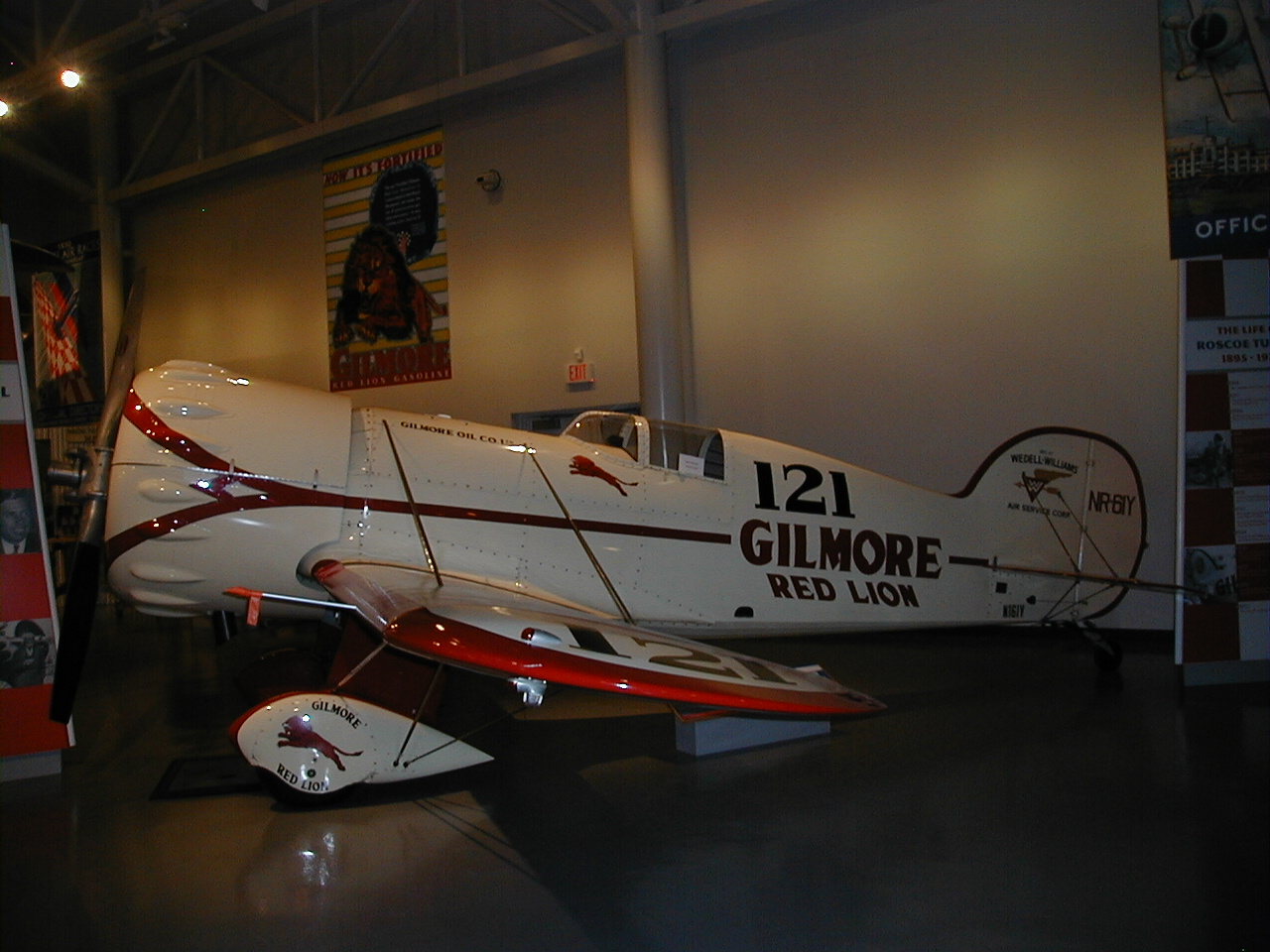
Wedell-Williams 44 Replica (NR61Y)

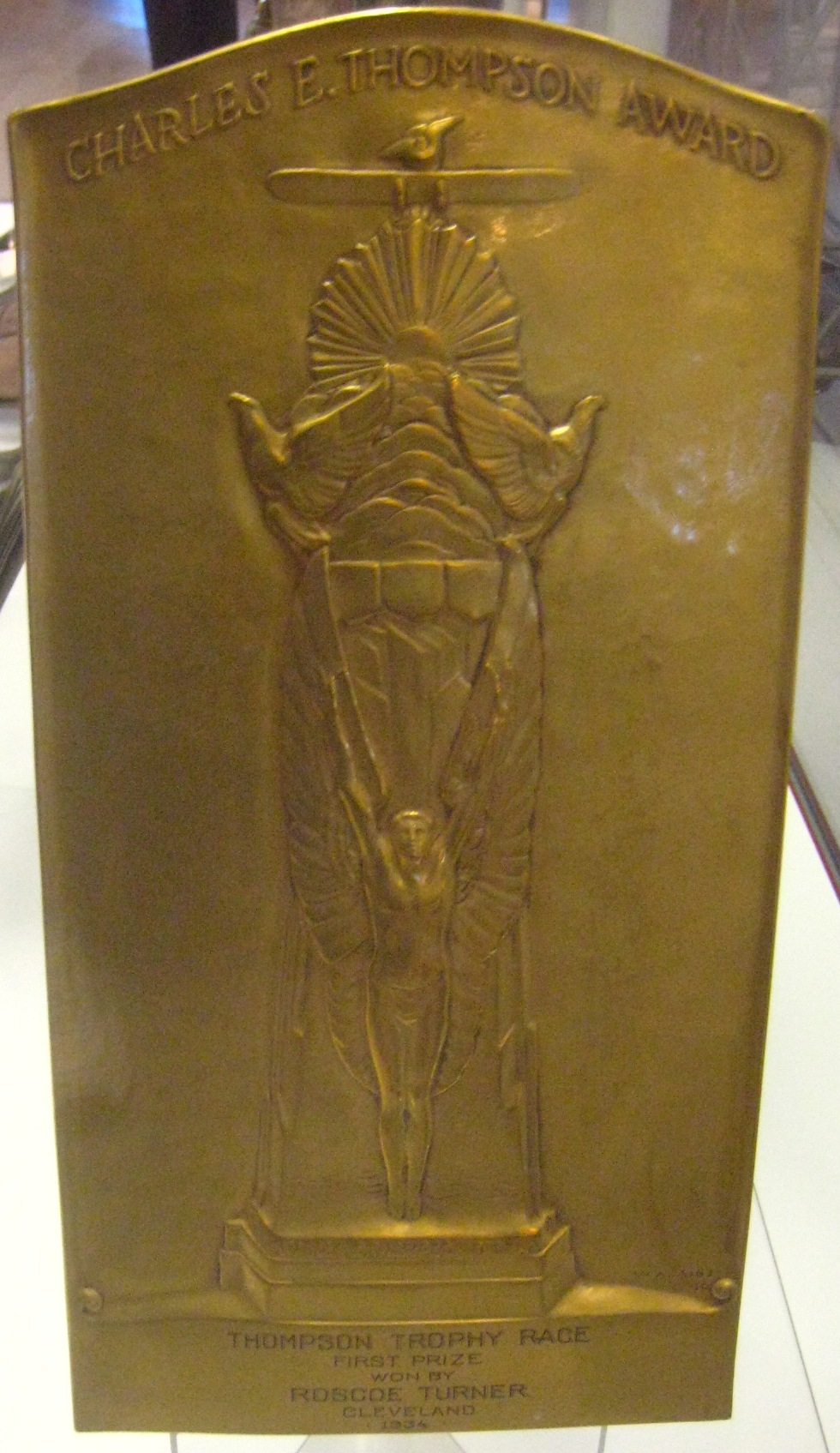
1934 Thompson Trophy Plaque

In early 1930, Turner persuaded Gilmore Oil Company to purchase from General Tire & Rubber Company the Lockheed Air Express (NR3057) that Henry Brown had flown in the 1929 races. Turner replaced the Pratt & Whitney R-1690 Hornet with a Pratt & Whitney R-1340 Wasp, fitted with an NACA cowling. The aircraft was painted cream with red and gold trim, plus matching lion head logo, advertising Gilmore Red Lion products. (Gilmore Oil Company was later absorbed by the Socony-Vacuum Oil Company, later renamed Mobil). Turner took on Lockheed employee Don Young as his mechanic, in a working partnership that lasted over 20 years.

Turner saw a lion cub advertised for sale in California, and persuaded the owner Louis Goebel to donate it to him in return for promoting his lion-breeding farm. He named the cub 'Gilmore', raised him at home in Beverly Hills, and gave him familiarization flights in the Air Express. Thereafter, and fitted with a Turner-adapted parachute, Gilmore accompanied Turner on many publicized flights and events until about 1935, when he became too heavy and unmanageable in the aircraft. After retirement with Louis Goebel, Gilmore died in 1952. The lion's body was stuffed, mounted, and put on display in the Turner home. In 1976, it was donated to the Smithsonian Institution.

On May 27, 1930, Turner flew the Air Express from Roosevelt Field to Grand Central Airport in 18:42:30 hours, breaking the east–west transcontinental airspeed record.

At the National Air Races at Cleveland in September 1931, Turner was impressed with Jimmy Wedell and his Wedell-Williams Model 44 that achieved second place in the Thompson Trophy race. After obtaining a grant of $5,000 from Gilmore Oil Company, Turner commissioned Wedell to build a new version of the Model 44 with a 525 hp Pratt & Whitney R-1690 Hornet engine to replace the 450 hp Pratt & Whitney R-985 Wasp Junior. That aircraft (NR54Y) crashed while Wedell was testing it, and a replacement was built with a redesigned wing.

At the National Air Races at Cleveland in September 1932, Turner came third in the Bendix Trophy cross-country race from Burbank, California to Cleveland in his Wedell-Williams Model 44 (NR61Y, race number 121), after Jimmy Haizlip followed by Jimmy Wedell, both also flying Model 44s. On November 14, 1932, Turner flew the Model 44 from Floyd Bennett Field, New York, to Burbank in 12:33 hours, breaking the east–west transcontinental airspeed record set by Frank Hawks.

For the National Air Races at Los Angeles in July 1933, Turner entered his Model 44 (NR61Y, race number 2), fitted with an 800 hp Pratt & Whitney R-1340 Wasp, painted in a combined Gilmore and 20th Century Fox Pictures scheme. On July 1, 1933, he flew in the Bendix Trophy race from New York to Los Angeles, gaining first place, ahead of Jimmy Wedell in his Model 44 (NR278V, race number 44). Turner's time was 11:30 hours, that also broke his own east–west transcontinental airspeed record. Wedell went on to win the Thompson Trophy circuit race, despite finishing behind Turner, who was disqualified after a pylon rules infringement. In 1933 Turner upgraded his Model 44 again with a 1000 hp supercharged Pratt & Whitney R-1690 Hornet engine, painted gold overall, and sponsored by Heinz and Macmillan Ring-Free Motor Oil. On September 2, 1933, he flew it from Los Angeles to New York in 10:04:30 hours, to break the west–east transcontinental airspeed record, to accompany his existing east to west record.

At the National Air Races at Cleveland in September 1934, Turner entered his Wedell-Williams Model 44 (NR61Y, race number 57), but was a non-starter in the Bendix Trophy race due to a fuel leak. On September 2, 1934, he set off after the Bendix race anyway, to show that he could have won it, but encountered storms en route to the race's venue at Cleveland. After a delayed refueling, he flew on to New York to break Frank Hawks' west–east record with a time of 10:02:39 hours. He then returned to Cleveland, and won the Thompson Trophy after the Model 44 flown by Doug Davis crashed fatally while leading the race.

== MacRobertson Air Race ==
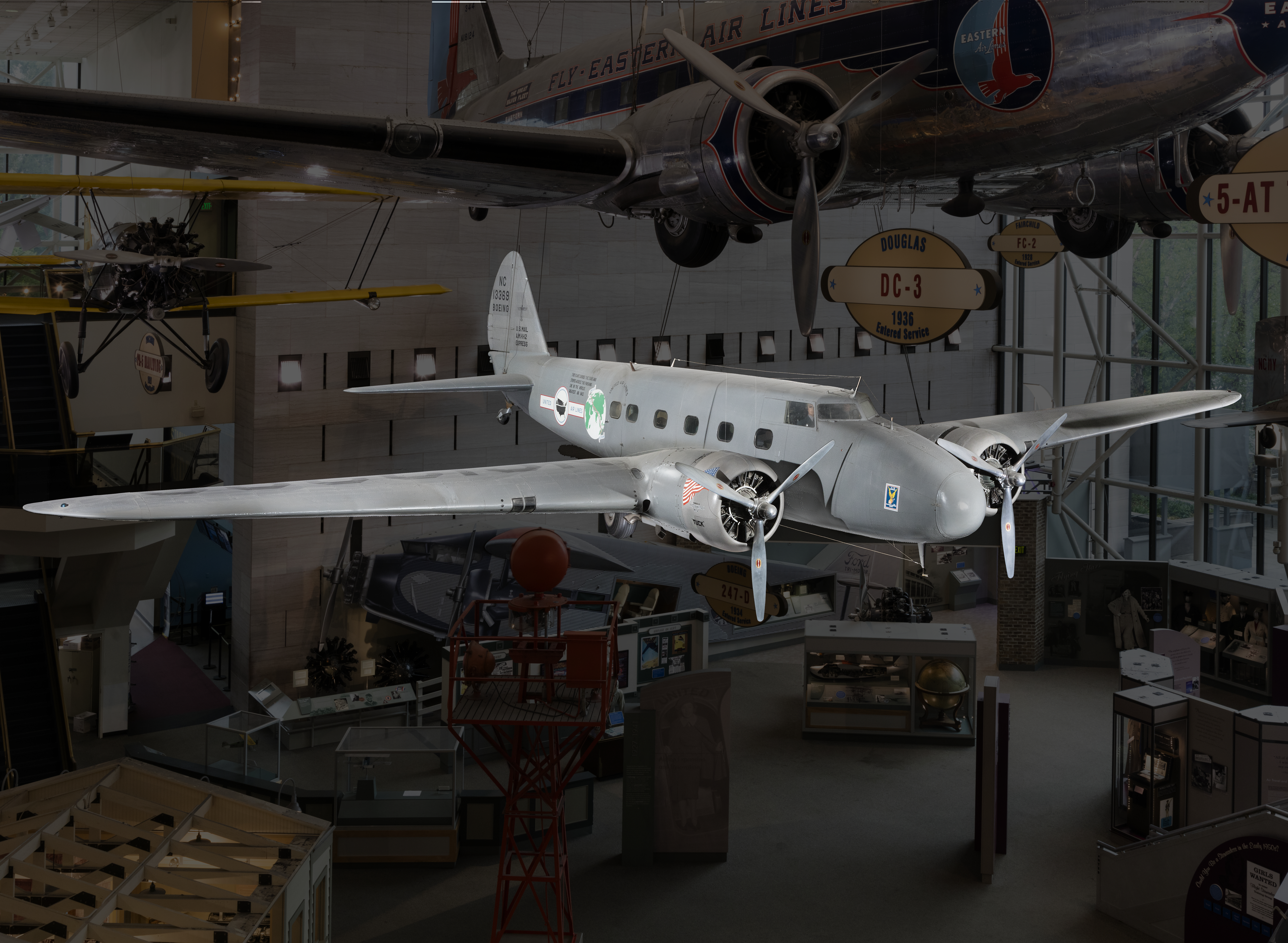
MacRobertson Race Boeing 247 displayed at NASM (painted NC13369 on right side, NR257Y on left side)

In 1933, Turner learned of plans to organize what became known as the MacRobertson Air Race, to be run from London, England to Melbourne, Australia, in October 1934. He quickly obtained sponsorship from Pratt & Whitney in the form of engines and technical assistance, followed by Boeing. United Airlines then offered to lend him one of their latest airliners, a Boeing 247 (NR257Y). Other sponsors included Heinz, Macmillan Oil Company, and Warner Brothers. Turner selected Clyde Pangborn as his co-pilot, due to his experience with international flights. The third crew member was Reeder Nichols, a partner in Bill Lear's Lear Development Corp, whose job it was to operate the Lear radio and direction finder. After modification and testing of the Boeing 247, Turner flew it to New York and had it loaded onto a passenger liner bound for England. After diversions and delays, the aircraft was reassembled at Hamble, then flown via Heston Aerodrome and RAF Martlesham Heath finally to the race starting point at RAF Mildenhall.

Turner departed Mildenhall on 20 October, eventual destination Melbourne, 11,300 miles distant. The sectors to Athens and then to Baghdad were flown without problem. The next destination was Allahabad, one of the five compulsory refueling stops, but at the calculated arrival time, the aircraft was in darkness and the crew could not see the expected lights of a city. They contacted the radio operator at Allahabad, with little success until they declared SOS, when they finally obtained a radio bearing. They landed with just sufficient fuel to park the aircraft. Further stops were made at Alor Setar, Singapore, Koepang, Timor, and Darwin, where they learned that the de Havilland DH.88 flown by C. W. A. Scott had already landed at Melbourne with a time of 71 hours. On the sector to Charleville, the oil pressures were low, so the engines were throttled back. They set out for Melbourne, but further engine oil problems led to a forced landing at Bourke, New South Wales, where they made minor repairs. They flew on, to cross the finishing line at Melbourne. After checking in with an elapsed time of 92:55 hours, Turner learned that the Dutch entry, a KLM Douglas DC-2, had arrived in a time of 90:13 hours. Turner's crew were awarded third place overall, and second place on handicap. The Boeing 247 went back into service, and in 1952 was presented to the National Air and Space Museum, where it is now displayed.

== More air racing ==
For much of 1935, Turner publicized many products and causes, including Boeing Model 80, United Airlines, Heinz foods, Camel cigarettes, Motor Glide scooters, Macmillan Oil, and the National Safety Council. He entered the Bendix Trophy race with his Model 44 (NR61Y, race number 57). On August 31, 1935, after flying from Burbank to Cleveland, he finished just 23.5 seconds after the winner Ben Howard in his Howard DGA-6 named Mr Mulligan. On September 2, 1935, in the Thompson Trophy race, his Model 44 suffered engine failure, but Turner made a safe dead-stick landing.

In late August 1936, Turner departed Burbank in his Wedell-Williams Model 44 (NR61Y) bound for New York from where the Bendix Trophy race was due to start. The Model 44 suffered engine problems near Flagstaff, Arizona, and he crash-landed on a Zuni Indian reservation. The carburetor had iced up and caused a serious power loss. On landing, the aircraft had somersaulted, breaking the fuselage behind the cockpit. Turner had fractured two ribs and a bone in his neck, but he endured 17 miles on horseback, then 35 miles in a car, and he then returned to Los Angeles by train before seeking medical help. He deceived the press about the cause of the accident, to save the reputation of Pratt & Whitney. On October 15, 1936, Turner flew the Lockheed Air Express into the first Roscoe Turner Airport at Corinth for its dedication ceremony. The airport had been built with funds from the Works Progress Administration on the site of the farm where he once kept his aircraft, and where he was married.

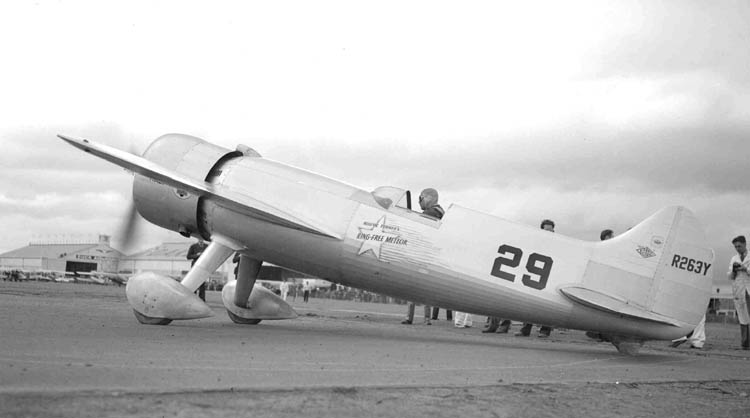
Turner RT-14 Special, 'Ring-Free Meteor', Oakland, 1938

During 1936, Turner worked on the design of a new racing aircraft to accommodate a 1000 hp Pratt & Whitney R-1830 Twin Wasp engine, plus his flying requirements to suit both cross-country races and closed circuit pylon races. He commissioned Professor Howard W. Barlow of University of Minneapolis to prepare the detailed design and drawings, and then engaged Lawrence W. Brown and his Brown Aircraft Co. to build the aircraft. Brown made many changes to the design during construction, and Turner demanded a larger wing to safely carry the extra weight, but serious disagreements caused Brown to quit the project. In May 1937, Don Young transported the uncompleted aircraft to the premises of Matty Laird in Chicago, where Young rebuilt the crashed Wedell-Williams Model 44, and Laird completed the new racer to Turner's requirements, that now included weight reduction plus a newly designed wing of greater span designed by Raoul Hoffman. In August 1937, Turner test flew his 'Turner Special' (officially Turner-Laird RT-14 Meteor, registered NR263Y), painted silver with tail number R263Y and racing number 29. On September 3, 1937, fuel leaks and consequent repairs caused Turner to miss the start of the Bendix Trophy race from Burbank to Cleveland. On September 6, Turner flew the racer, labeled 'Ring-Free Meteor', in the Thompson Trophy race. He led the race, but then circled a pylon in the mistaken belief that he had turned inside it, and only came third. Turner's Wedell-Williams Model 44 (R61Y, race number 25, named 'Ring-Free Comet') piloted by Lt Joseph C. Mackey, dropped out of the same race with engine failure. In November 1936, Turner started broadcasting an NBC radio show titled 'Flying Time', for five days a week.

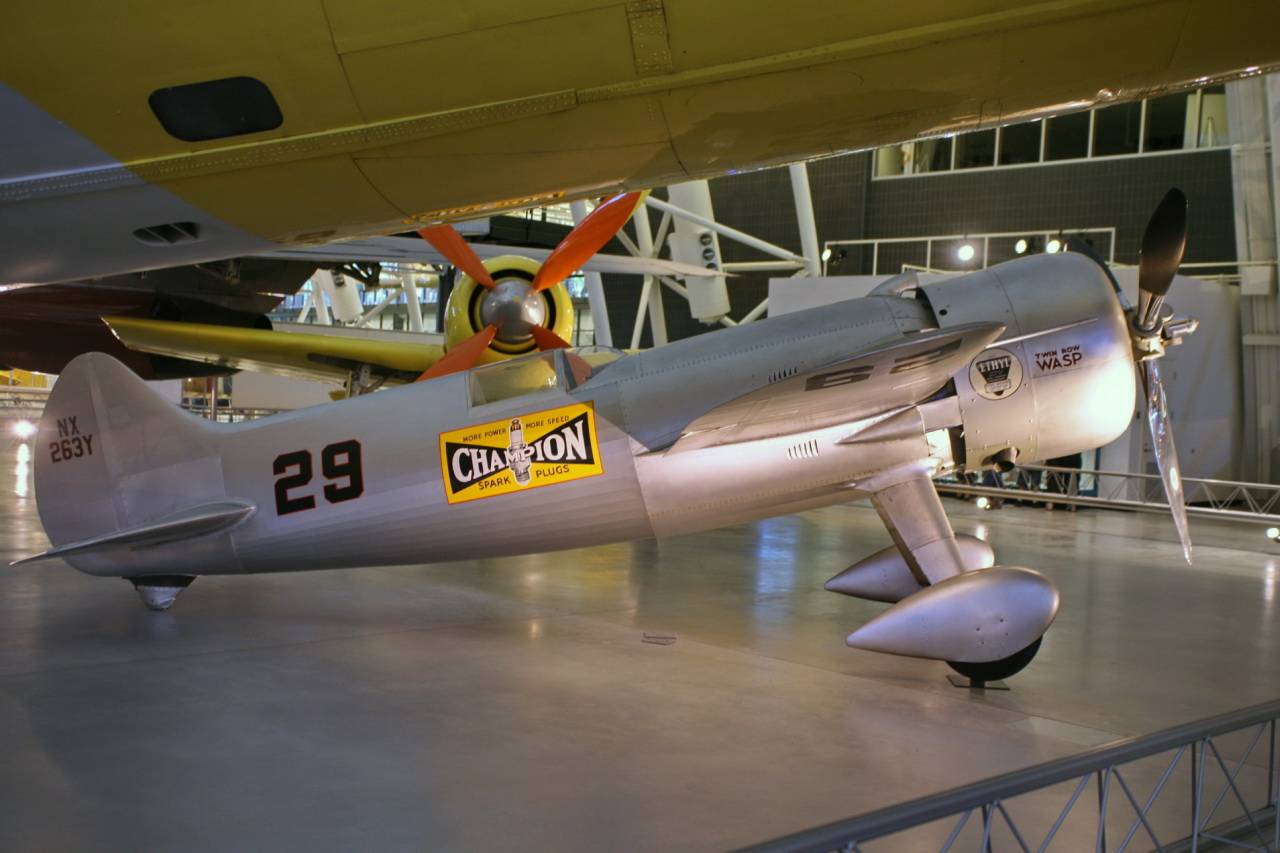
Turner-Laird RT-14 Meteor on display at the Udvar-Hazy annex of the National Air and Space Museum.

In 1938, Turner had the Turner Special modified with wheel spats and other improvements. On May 30, 1938, he entered it in a closed circuit race at Oakland and came second, but posted the highest average speed over one lap of 278.8 mile/h. The rules for the Bendix race had been changed to disallow participating aircraft being used to compete for the Thompson Trophy. The Thompson Trophy race had been lengthened to 30 laps of a 10-mile circuit, and Turner decided to enter with R263Y (race number 29) newly sponsored by Pesco Products and renamed 'Pesco Special'. On September 5, 1938, he won the race with an average speed of 283.4 mile/h, having lapped Earl Ortman in second place in his Keith Rider R-3 (NX14215, race number 4). Turner's Wedell-Williams Model 44 (NX61Y, race number 25) piloted by Joe Mackey, came fifth in the same race. In October 1938, Turner took part in a movie film 'Flight at Midnight', released in August 1939, but most of his footage was cut.

In 1939, Turner was employed by the Porterfield Aircraft Corporation to promote, demonstrate and sell its aircraft, but he resigned in 1940. He secured new sponsoring contracts with Firestone Tire and Rubber Company and Kellogg's. His RT-14 Meteor (NX263Y, race number 29) was entered in the Thompson Trophy race, sponsored by Champion spark plugs. On September 5, 1939, he won the race at an average speed of 282.536 mile/h, with one lap timed at 299.03 mile/h. Joe Mackey came sixth in Turner's Model 44 (NX61Y). Turner demanded that Don Young join him on the podium, where he publicly announced "This is my last race. I'll be 44 this month. This is a young man's game."

== Radio and movies ==
In 1939, Turner hosted the youth oriented radio program Sky Blazers, sponsored by Wonder Bread, which featured dramatizations of the exploits of adventurous aviators. That same year he played himself in the movie Flight at Midnight where he helps a stunt pilot raise money to prevent an airfield from closing.

== Commerce ==
In November 1939, Turner and two partners purchased the stock of Central Aeronautical Corporation (CAC), that offered aircraft sales and services at Indianapolis Municipal Airport. The purpose was to obtain local planning authority to build a hangar and administration building in order to start business as a Fixed-Base Operator (FBO). In February 1940, CAC was renamed Roscoe Turner Aeronautical Corporation (RTAC), and the new buildings were dedicated in May 1941. By that time, RTAC operated 16 aircraft and offered sales, servicing, charters, flight instruction and ground school training. In July 1941, Turner suffered a fractured pelvis in an automobile accident, and settled out of court after suing for loss of earnings. He campaigned for the establishment of an air force separate from the US Army, and proposed the use of "flivver" planes for national defense, converted from small private aircraft.

After the US joined World War II, in December 1941, Turner continued to campaign on many aviation issues, but his personal and business ideas and proposals were repeatedly turned down by the government and the Army Air Force. RTAC took part in the Civilian Pilot Training Program (CPTP), then renamed the War Training Service (WTS), and in February 1943, RTAC took on additional training programs. In early 1944, all the WTS programs were discontinued. By then, RTAC had trained an estimated 3,500 students. In July 1944, Roscoe started a daily charter service between Detroit and Memphis, managed by his brother Robert Turner, but after forty days it was shut down by the Civil Aeronautics Board (CAB) who ruled that it was an unauthorized scheduled airline service.

On December 13, 1946, he married his second wife, Madonna M. Miller, who went on to become president and then treasurer of RTAC, and is credited with rescuing the finances of Turner and RTAC.

=== Turner Airlines ===
In February 1948, RTAC obtained authority from the CAB to operate airline services from a hub at Weir Cook Municipal Airport (formerly Indianapolis Municipal Airport) under the name Turner Airlines. However, Turner failed to obtain sufficient finances, and sold the franchise to John Weesner and Paul Weesner. On August 9, 1949, they officially formed Turner Airlines, and on November 12, 1949, began operating services. In February 1950, it was renamed Lake Central Airlines. Turner continued to campaign and crusade for strong national air power in the Cold War.

== Later life ==
In 1949, a special act of Congress was passed to award the Distinguished Flying Cross to Turner, who received it on August 14, 1952, at the Pentagon. The citation for the decoration was "for extraordinary achievement while participating in aerial flight". Turner was the last civilian to receive the DFC.

On April 2, 1961, Turner attended the dedication of a new Roscoe Turner Airport at Corinth, replacing the 1936 airport of that name in a different location. In 1962, Turner was named "Character of the Year" by the International Order of Characters - a fraternal organization of aviators. He was the first person to receive the honor. In 1967, Turner sold his controlling interest in RTAC to Charles Gates, Jr., president of Gates Rubber Company. Gates had acquired a majority holding in Learjet, that was a competitor of Beechcraft, and Beechcraft Corporation then canceled all contracts with RTAC, which had been operating a major Beechcraft distributorship and service facility. In September 1968, all the remaining financial interests of Roscoe and Madonna Turner in Turner businesses were sold.

On September 29, 1970, the Roscoe Turner Museum was opened at Indianapolis, with exhibits that included the Turner Special aircraft and his Packard automobile, plus many trophies and other artifacts. Don Young became its curator. It closed in 1972, and in 1976 the contents were transferred to the Smithsonian's National Air and Space Museum, where the exhibits include the Boeing 247 that Turner flew in the MacRobertson Race. He was an honorary official with the Indianapolis 500 car race for many years.

Roscoe Turner died on June 23, 1970, and is interred at Crown Hill Cemetery in Indianapolis.

== Military awards ==
Turner's military awards and decorations included:

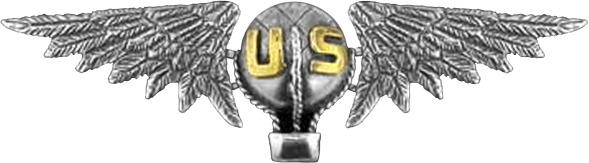
Aeronaut Badge
Distinguished Flying Cross
World War I Victory Medal
Army of Occupation of Germany Medal

== Legacy ==
The stuffed body of Turner's pet lion Gilmore is in the collections of the National Air and Space Museum, along with other Turner memorabilia. The Indianapolis chapter of the International Plastic Modelers Society is named after Turner. Roscoe Turner Airport in Corinth, Mississippi is named after him. There is an exhibit about Turner's life in the Crossroads Museum in Corinth, Mississippi. The archives at the University of Wyoming American Heritage Center contain information about the evolution of aviation from 1920 to 1970, records of the MacRobertson International Air Race England to Australia, and correspondences and photographs of Turner's life and his viewpoints on air racing, safety, and supporting his family.

In 1975, Turner was enshrined in the National Aviation Hall of Fame in Dayton, Ohio.

His Turner RT-14 Meteor aircraft was on display since 2003 at the National Air and Space Museum's Udvar-Hazy Center in Chantilly, Virginia, before being moved to the Smithsonian Museum’s flagship location on the National Mall in Washington, D.C. in the new "Nation of Speed" gallery, which opened in the fall of 2022.

== In popular culture ==
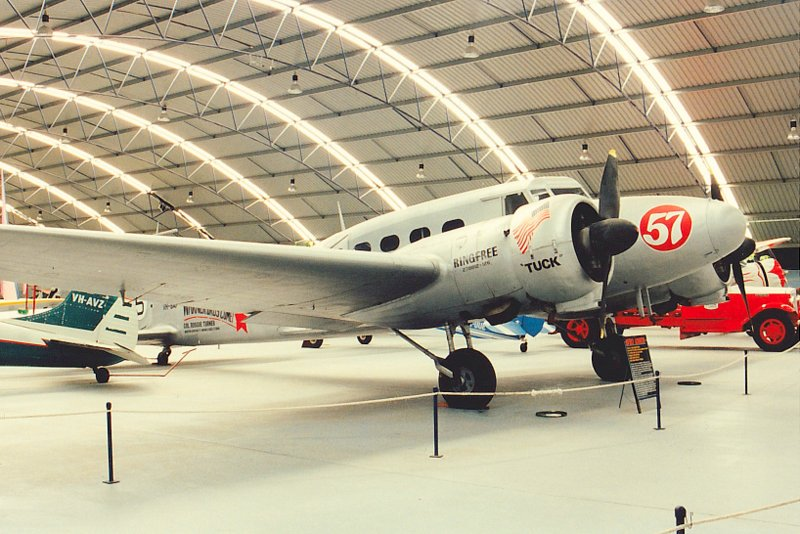
Avro Anson used in The Great Air Race as a stand-in for the Boeing 247 in the MacRobertson Race

In the 1991 Australian television miniseries The Great Air Race (about the 1934 London-Melbourne MacRobertson Air Race), Turner was portrayed by Barry Bostwick. Actor and animal trainer Raymond Ducasse portrayed Turner in the 2004 motion picture The Aviator about the life and career of Howard Hughes. In the film, Turner attends the 1930 Hollywood premiere of Hughes' epic picture Hell's Angels with his lion cub Gilmore.

== See also ==
- List of covers of Time magazine (1930s)
- List of members of the American Legion
- The Adventures of Smilin' Jack
