= Hugh Linaker =

Australian gardener

Hugh Linaker (1872–1938) was a gardener and landscape gardener, who worked on various local and state government projects in the State of Victoria, Australia.

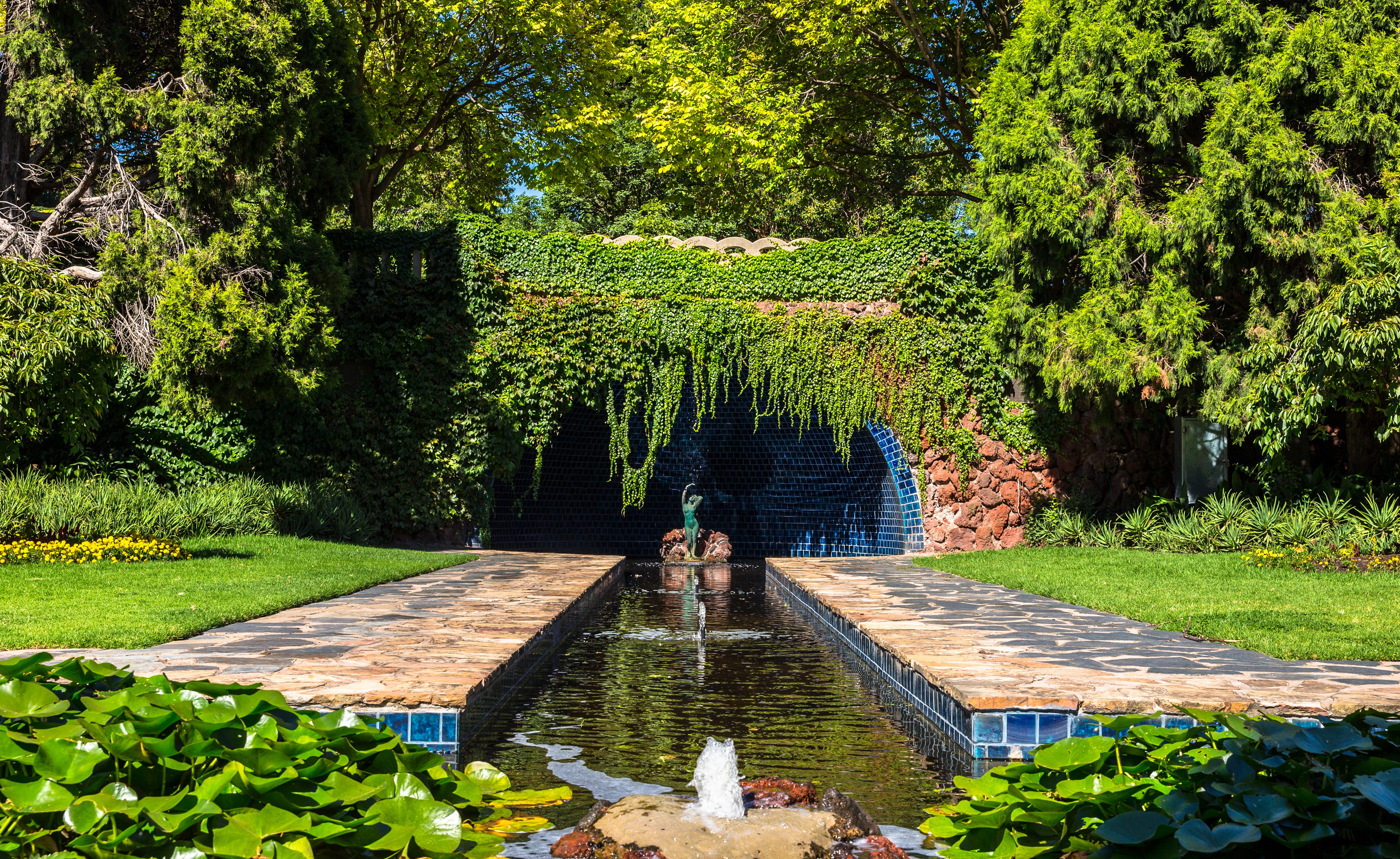
Pioneer Women's Memorial Garden (Melbourne)

Originally hailing from Ballarat, he was appointed as the Curator of Parks and Gardens for Ararat 1901 where he landscaped the Ararat Botanic Gardens, today better known as Alexandra Park. He applied, and was successful in 1912, to become the 'landscape gardener, Hospital for the Insane,' a position he held until 1937.

It is in this role, that Linaker produced multiple designs for the government, and is particularly well known for his landscape planning associated with psychiatric hospitals.

Grounds designed by Linaker for the government include Alexandra Park, Ararat., Aradale Asylum, Buchan Caves, Maroondah Reservoir Park, May Day Hills/Beechworth Asylum, Mont Park, Pioneer Women's Memorial Garden within the King's Domain, Sunbury Asylum, Yarra Bend Park, and the SEC company town of Yallourn

He also was involved in the design of private gardens, the best-known of which is Burnham Beeches in Sherbrooke, Dandenong Ranges.

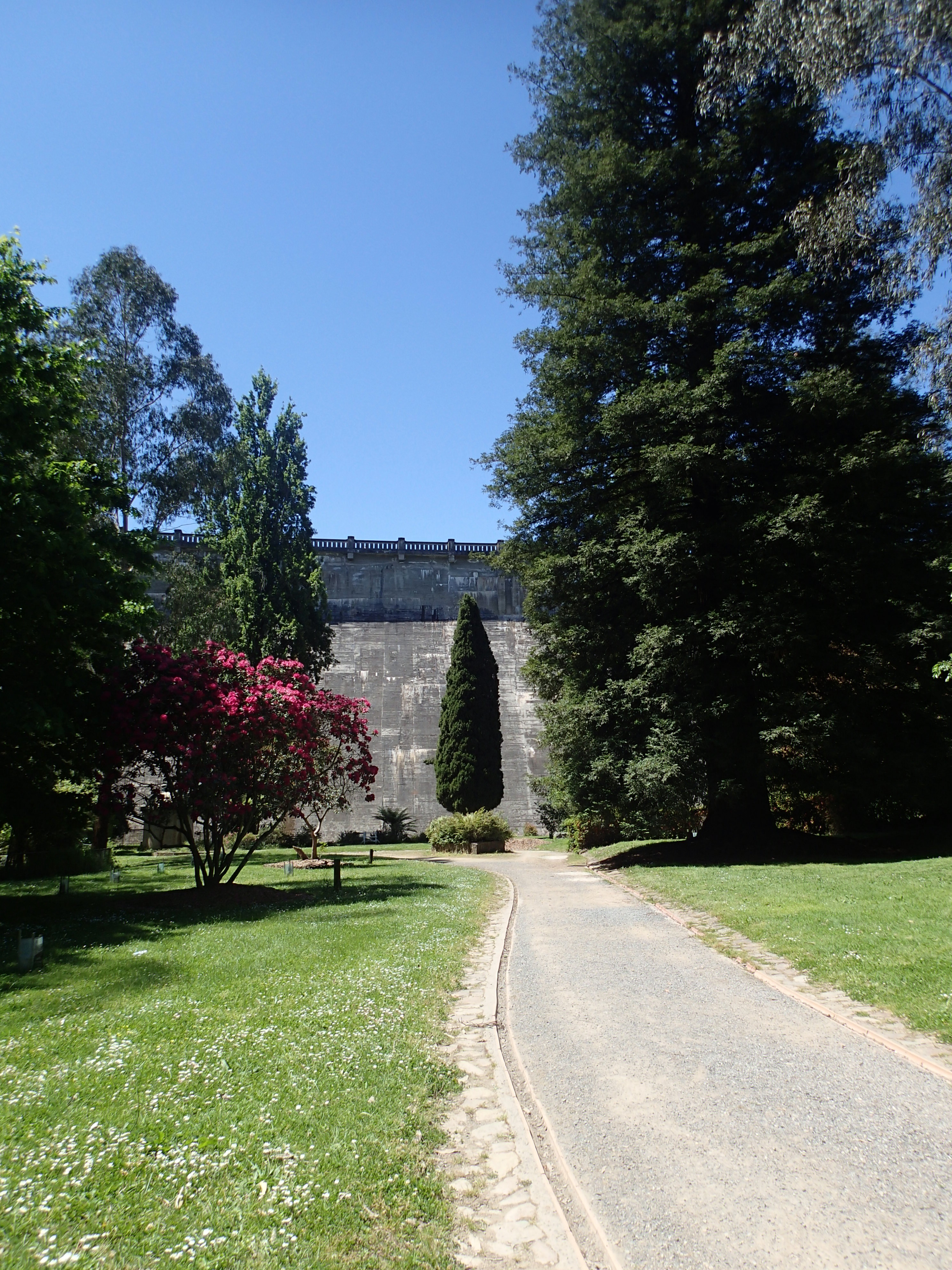
Linaker's style of using vertical trees is evident in his plantings, such as at the Maroondah Reservoir Park.
