= Flight at Midnight =

1939 film by Sidney Salkow

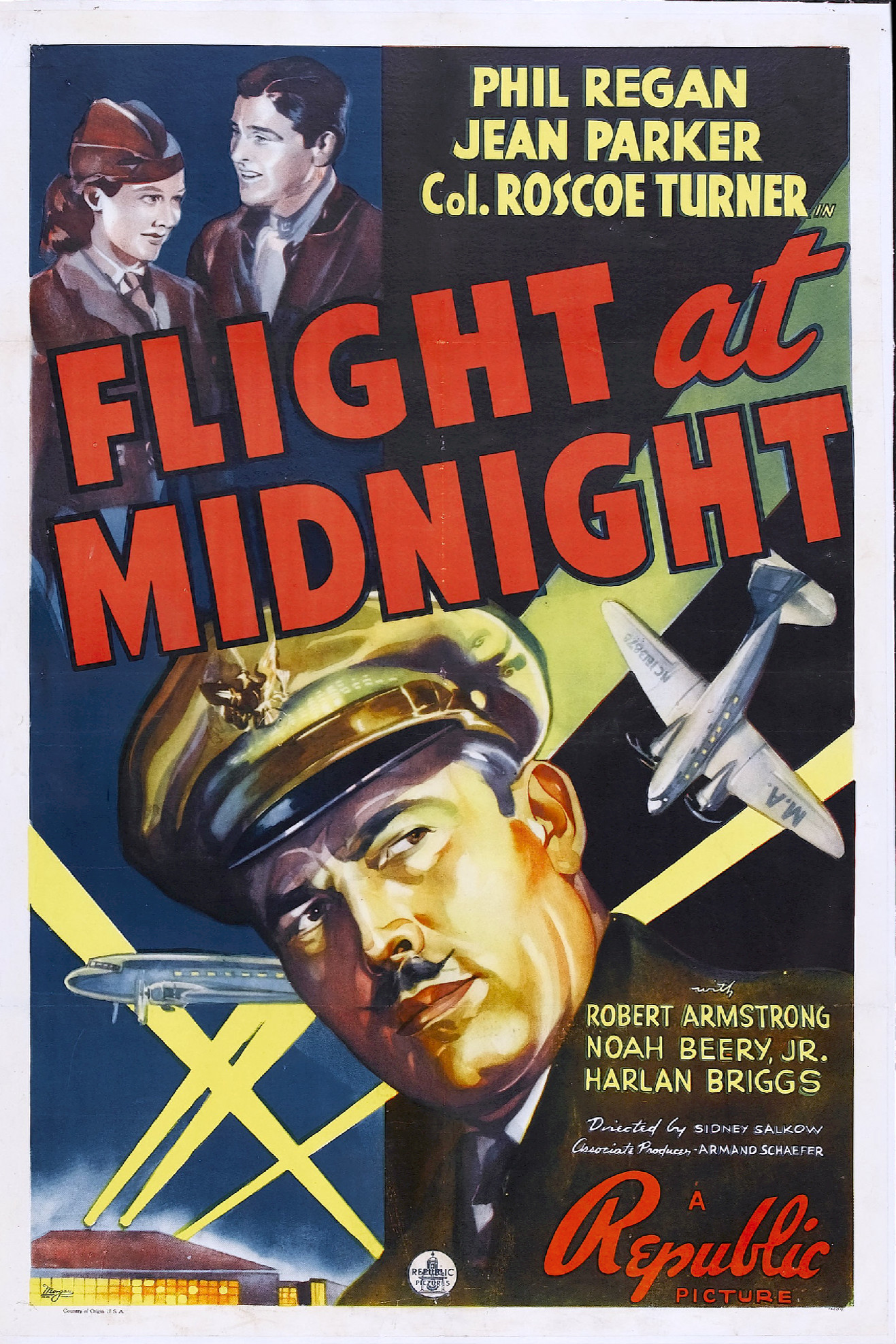
- Theatrical release poster
- Directed by: Sidney Salkow
- Screenplay by: Eliot Gibbons
- Story by: Daniel Moore; Hugh King
- Produced by: Armand Schaefer
- Starring: Phil Regan; Jean Parker; Roscoe Turner; Robert Armstrong; Noah Beery Jr. Harlan Briggs
- Cinematography: Ernest Miller
- Edited by: William Morgan
- Music by: Score: Cy Feuer; William Lava; Songs: Burton Lane (music); Ralph Freed (lyrics)
- Production company: Republic Pictures
- Distributed by: Republic Pictures
- Release date: August 28, 1939
- Running time: 66 minutes
- Country: United States
- Language: English

Flight at Midnight is a 1939 American action film directed by Sidney Salkow and written by Eliot Gibbons. The film stars Phil Regan, Jean Parker, Roscoe Turner, Robert Armstrong, Noah Beery Jr. and Harlan Briggs. Flight at Midnight was released on August 28, 1939, by Republic Pictures.

== Plot ==
Norwark's field director "Pop" Hussey has a lot of trouble. His airport is well-equipped, but a high-voltage line located on the edge leads the administration to close it and Hussey is given two months to find a solution. Hussey does not have the money to move the line, and the municipality is turning a deaf ear. The CAA inspector is still present when a student pilot crashes after narrowly avoiding power lines. "Spinner" McGee is a Midway Airlines pilot who hauls mail at night. He is also a true romantic and is often lovestruck.

After a hectic flight during which McGee also narrowly avoids high-voltage cables, he meets the beautiful air hostess Maxine. He learns that he has been suspended for two months because of his repetitive delays and bad judgment. He then opens a flying school, with much publicity, and its success endangers the mail flights. McGee is to test a new aircraft that interests the Coast Guard. But because he late, his mechanic takes his place and is killed in a crash. McGee feels the loss very deeply.

Hussey interests the local authorities in the future of his airport, stressing that he needs help. While the notables are in an aircraft piloted by Roscoe Turner, the mayor, from the air, can address the crowd below. But the aircraft has engine trouble and must land immediately but the electrical wires are in its path. Just then, an aircraft piloted by McGee suddenly cuts in front of them before crashing to the ground.

The airliner and its passengers and pilot are saved and McGee is taken to the hospital, where he finds Maxine running to console him.

== Cast ==
- Phil Regan as "Spinner" McGee
- Jean Parker as Maxine Scott
- Roscoe Turner as Col. Roscoe Turner
- Robert Armstrong as Jim Brennan
- Noah Beery Jr. as "Torpy" McDonald
- Harlan Briggs as "Pop" Hussey
- Helen Lynd as Josephine
- Barbara Pepper as Mildred
- Harry Hayden as Hank Neary
- Raymond Bailey as Bill Hawks

== Production ==
Principal location photography took place at Grand Central Air Terminal and featured the famous race pilot Roscoe Turner, who was also prominently featured in the film's advertising materials. (Note: Turner's role in Flight at Midnight is his only credited appearance in films, although he participated as a pilot in filming Hell's Angels (1930) and Air Hawks (1935), albeit uncredited.)

The aircraft seen in Flight at Midnight were:

- Stinson Model R (N12152)
- Kinner Sportster K (NC14237)
- Luscombe 8
- Ryan ST
- Stinson Model A trimotor
- Lockheed Model 10 Electra

== Reception ==
New York Times film reviewer Frank Nugent wrote: "As a suggestion to the War Department, couldn't something be done about providing filmgoers with their own anti-aircraft batteries to bring down such Jennies, such crates, such menaces to commercial aviation movies as 'Flight at Midnight', which pancaked into the Criterion yesterday? For this is the baling-wired veteran of a thousand screen engagements which has, at its controls, the carefree, rule-breaking, heart-breaking pilot who has to be sobered by his best friend's death into realizing that there is a sterner code in flying, etc. With Phil Regan as the pilot, Robert Armstrong as the disciple of duty. Jean Parker as the flying hostess and a few stock shots of plane crashes, the picture should have been grounded in a neighborhood house on a double bill, not permitted to solo on Broadway."
