= Pioneer Women's Memorial Garden (Melbourne) =

Coordinates: 37°49′30″S 144°58′34″E

The Pioneer Women's Memorial Garden is located in Kings Domain, Melbourne, Australia and honours the contribution of women settlers to the development of the state of Victoria.

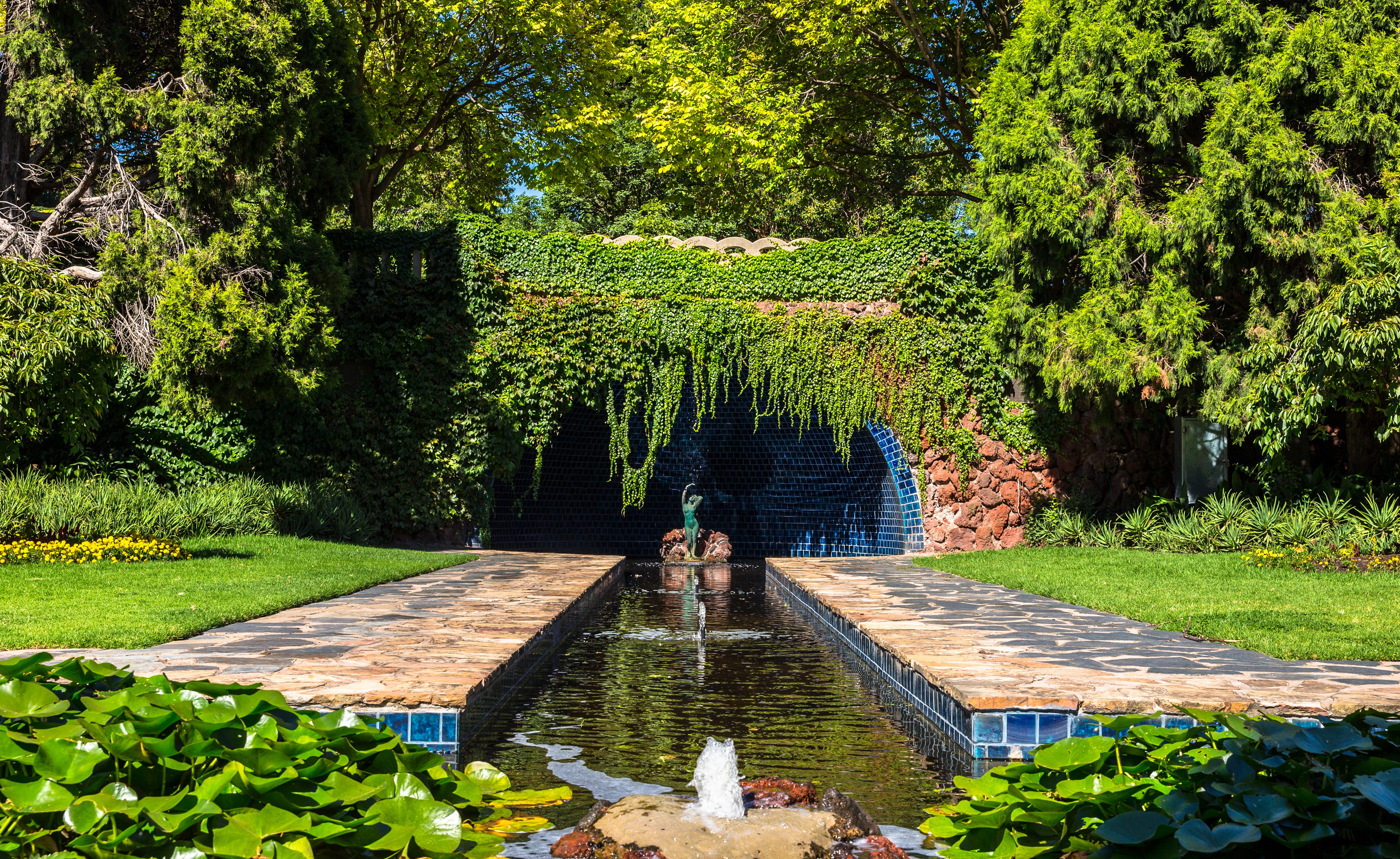
Pioneer Women's Memorial Garden (Melbourne)

In 1933, plans for the celebrations for the 1934 Centenary of Melbourne began to be made, and a Women's Centenary Council was formed to ensure women's opinions were included. At the first meeting, it was agreed that a memorial garden of remembrance would be created in Kings Domain. A variety of fundraising ventures followed, including producing and selling a commemorative book, and receiving public subscriptions to have a particular woman's name inscribed on a "sheet of remembrance". These sheets were later buried underneath the sundial in the garden.

The garden was designed by Hugh Linaker and is a formal, symmetrical garden traversed by a watercourse. This flows into a grotto which contains a bronze statue of a woman by the sculptor Charles Web Gilbert.

Two plaques in the garden were unveiled at a ceremony on Saturday 8 June 1935 by Lady Huntingfield, the wife of the Governor of Victoria, and Mrs I.H. Moss, the president of the Women's Centenary Council. In 1960, the Quota Club of Melbourne planted a tree in the garden.

The garden is today a popular venue for outdoor weddings.
