= 1934 Centenary of Melbourne =

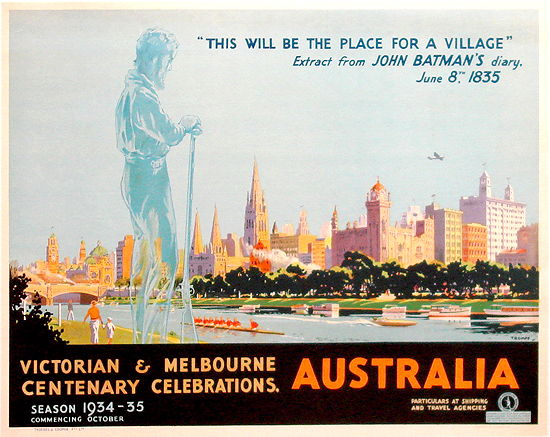
Poster for the Melbourne Centenary in 1934, designed by Percy Trompf for the Australian Natives Association

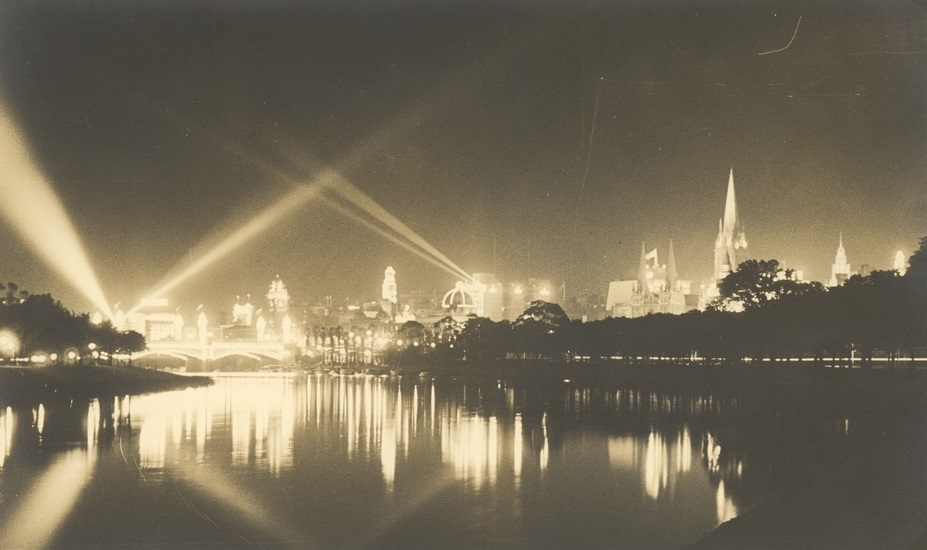
Centenary lighting of the city seen from across the Yarra River

The Melbourne Centenary was a 1934 centennial celebration of the founding of the city of Melbourne, Australia.

As Victoria reeled from the severe economic and social fracturing of the Great Depression, its Centenary celebrated progress and community cohesion. Held between October 1934 and June 1935, the Centenary in fact celebrated two 'foundation' events, firstly commemorating Edward Henty's Portland settlement on 19 November 1834 as the first white settlement in what would later become the state of Victoria, then John Batman's pronouncement of the area upstream of the Yarra River as 'the place for a village', taken as the city's foundation, on 8 June 1835.

John Batman was promoted as an heroic icon in an effort to embody the rewarding aspects of self-improvement, and was given more prominence as a founding father rather than John Pascoe Fawkner, whose advance party had in fact settled the site of the city where the Customs House is now located before Batman's party could return to make a permanent camp.

The Centenary Celebrations Council co-ordinated over 300 events held across Victoria, including 'Centenary editions' of the Royal Agricultural Show, the Melbourne Cup and other sporting events, but the major events were a Royal Visit by the Prince Henry, Duke of Gloucester through October and November, the Centenary Air Race, the display of the 'world's biggest birthday cake' at the Joyland fair on the banks of the Yarra, and the Centenary Art Exhibition. Other major events included a National Eucharistic Congress organised for the Catholics of the country by archbishop Daniel Mannix and a Centenary Jamboree held for the country's scouts in Frankston from 27 December 1934 - 7 January 1935, attended by the 77 year old founder of the movement, Lord Baden Powell.

The Centenary Cake was widely reported as 'the world's biggest', weighing 10 tons, and 50 ft high, surmounted by 99 candles, made by George Rath, a well known confectioner, and was reported to be cut into 250,000 pieces individually wrapped in cellophane and then in a tin box, with 100 containing gold sovereigns, for sale for 1 shilling, with part of the proceeds to go to various charities. The cake was launched and the first cut made by the Governor, Lord Huntingfield, while the Joyland fair was opened by the Lady Mayoress, Mrs Gengoult Smith, on 29 September 1934. A silver clock depicting the cake, made by Sheeth & Sons, was also displayed, donated by the Myer Emporium, and was intended as a prize to the 'holder of the greatest number of attendance stamps', but appears never to have been claimed, and is now in the collection of the National Gallery of Victoria.

Many events were sponsored by the City of Melbourne, which was also the location for most of them. The city's streets were brightly illuminated at night by both special lighting of major buildings, and 'lollypop' light standards erected by the city on the major streets, while Princes Bridge was enhanced by flag-bedecked pylons.

As the centenary committee which organised events was entirely male, a Women's Centenary Council was established to ensure women's opinions were heard. This council was responsible for planning, funding and constructing the Pioneer Women's Memorial Garden in Kings Domain, which was opened on Saturday, 8 June 1935.

Many wealthy individuals made donations towards events and commemorations, with MacPherson Robertson, the confectionery king, donating the then enormous sum of £100,000 in 1933, to be spent on various projects. The then Lord Mayor of Melbourne Harold Gengoult Smith suggested that an air race should be organised from London to Melbourne, and £15,000 of the gift was allocated as prize money, to which Robertson agreed, on condition the race was named after him and was as safe as possible. The MacRobertson Centenary Air Race was duly organised and attracted international entries from many well known fliers of the day. The race started at RAF Mildenhall, Suffolk, England, and 2 days, 23 hours, 18 seconds later, at 3.34 pm, on 23 October 1934, the de Havilland DH.88 Comet, "Grosvenor House", piloted by C.W.A. Scott and Tom Campbell Black, crossed the finish line at Flemington Racecourse, Melbourne, winning the speed section of the great race. Second and third places were taken by American-made Boeing 247s and Douglas DC-2s.

The remainder of Robertsons gift was spent on public works projects, mostly named in honour of their donor, including the construction of the Mac.Robertson Girls' High School, the MacRobertson Bridge over the Yarra River at Grange Road, the Art Deco style Macpherson Robertson Fountain behind the Melbourne Shrine of Remembrance, and a new home for the National Herbarium of Victoria in the Royal Botanic Gardens.

== Major events ==
Numerous events were planned, or happened to take place during the Centenary celebrations, and so were counted as part of the commemoration. Events included :

- Joyland carnival on the banks of the Yarra, 29 September 1934 - February 1935
- Cooks' Cottage, the home of the parents of Captain Cook, was transported from North Yorkshire to the Fitzroy Gardens, and reopened as a tourist attraction on 15 October 1934.
- Centenary Floral Parade, 27 October 1934
- The MacRobertson Centenary Air Race, 21–23 October 1934
- Mac.Robertson Bridge opened on 6 November 1934
- Mac.Robertson Girls' High School opened on 7 November 1934
- The Shrine of Remembrance was finally completed after five years of construction and dedicated in a huge ceremony on 11 November 1934.
- National Eucharistic Congress, Dec 1934
- The Pioneer Women's Memorial Garden was dedicated on 8 June 1935

== Gallery ==
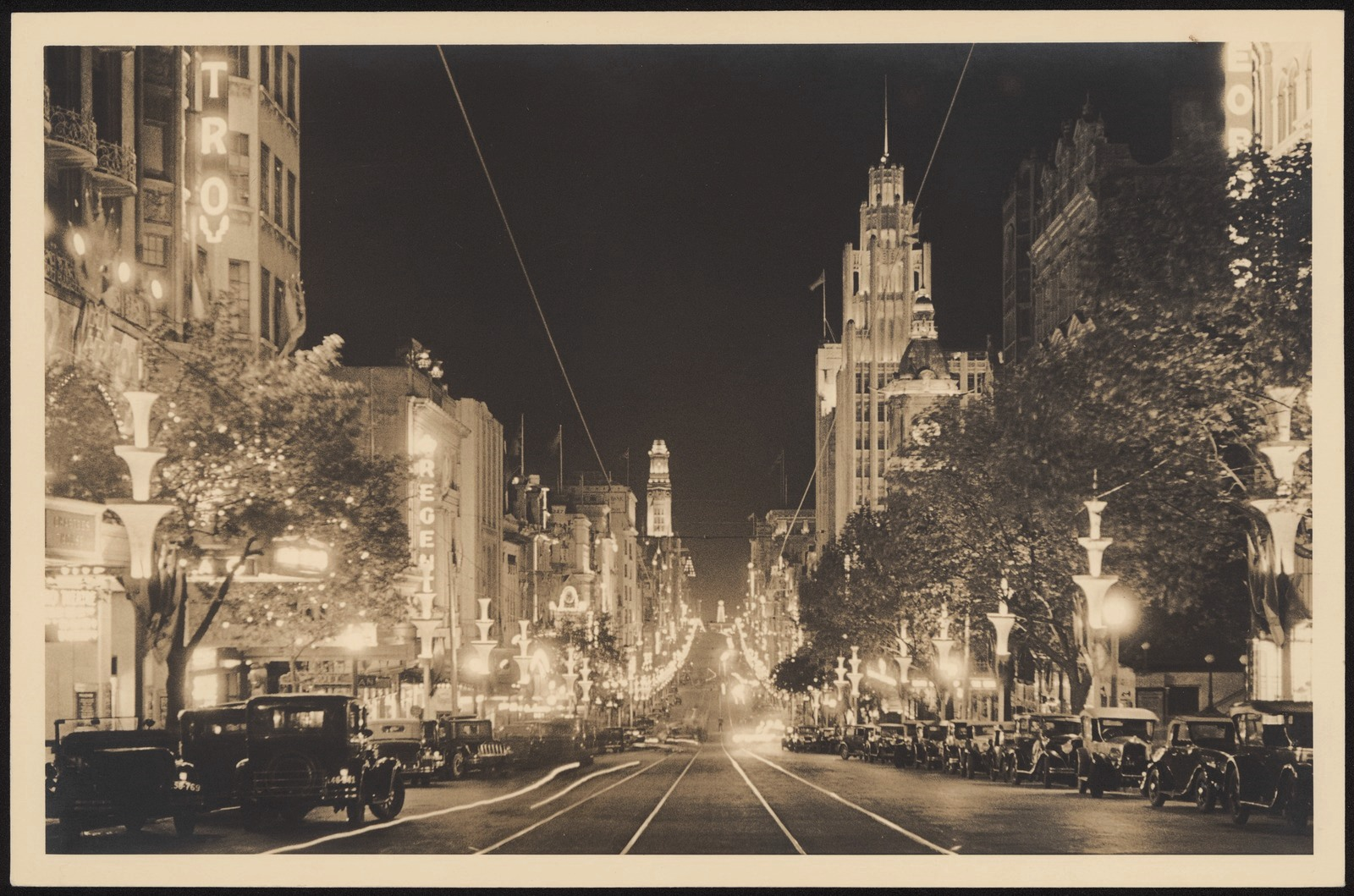
Melbourne Centenary lighting on Collins Street

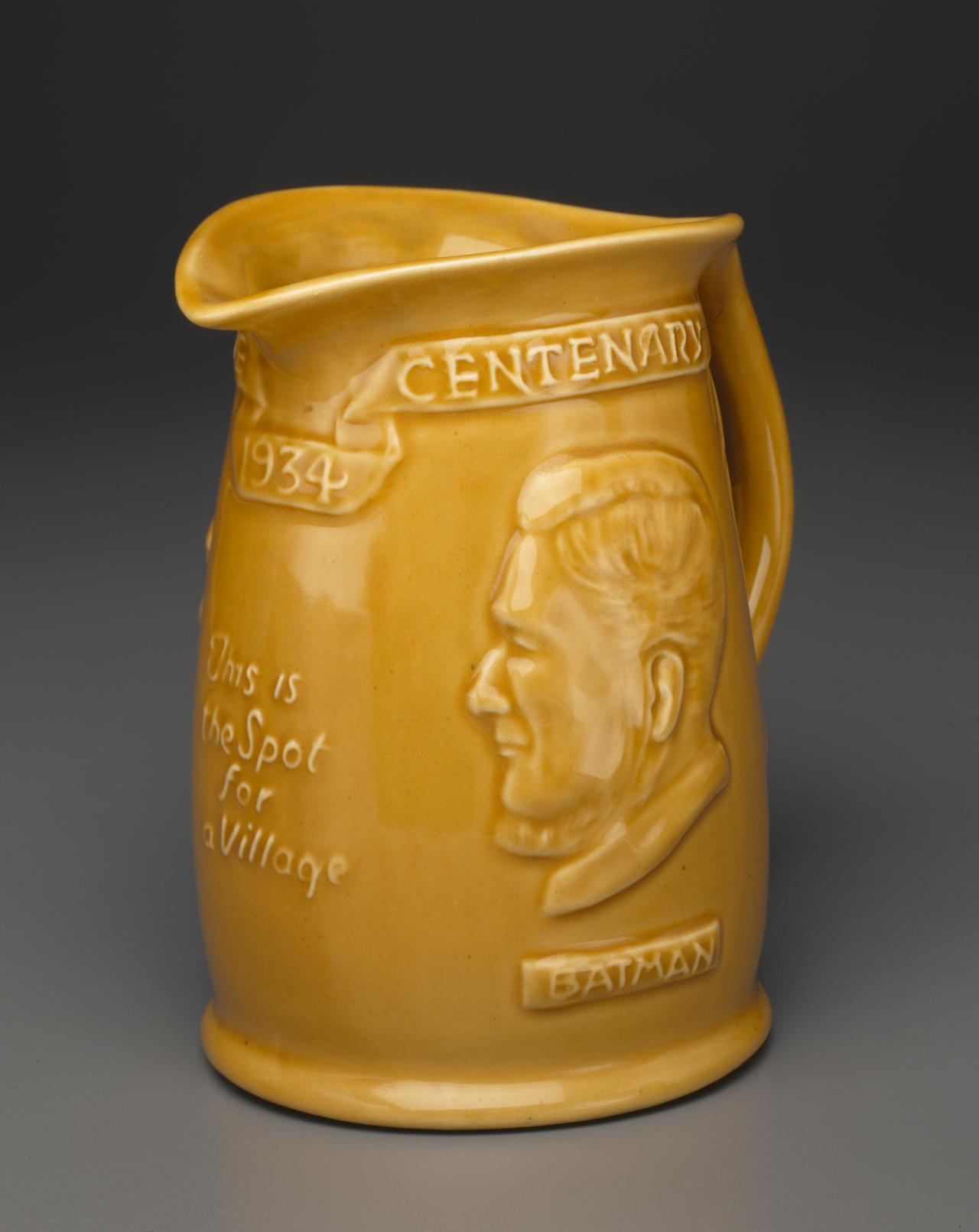
Jug depicting Batman and Fawkner, Brunswick Brickworks, 1934

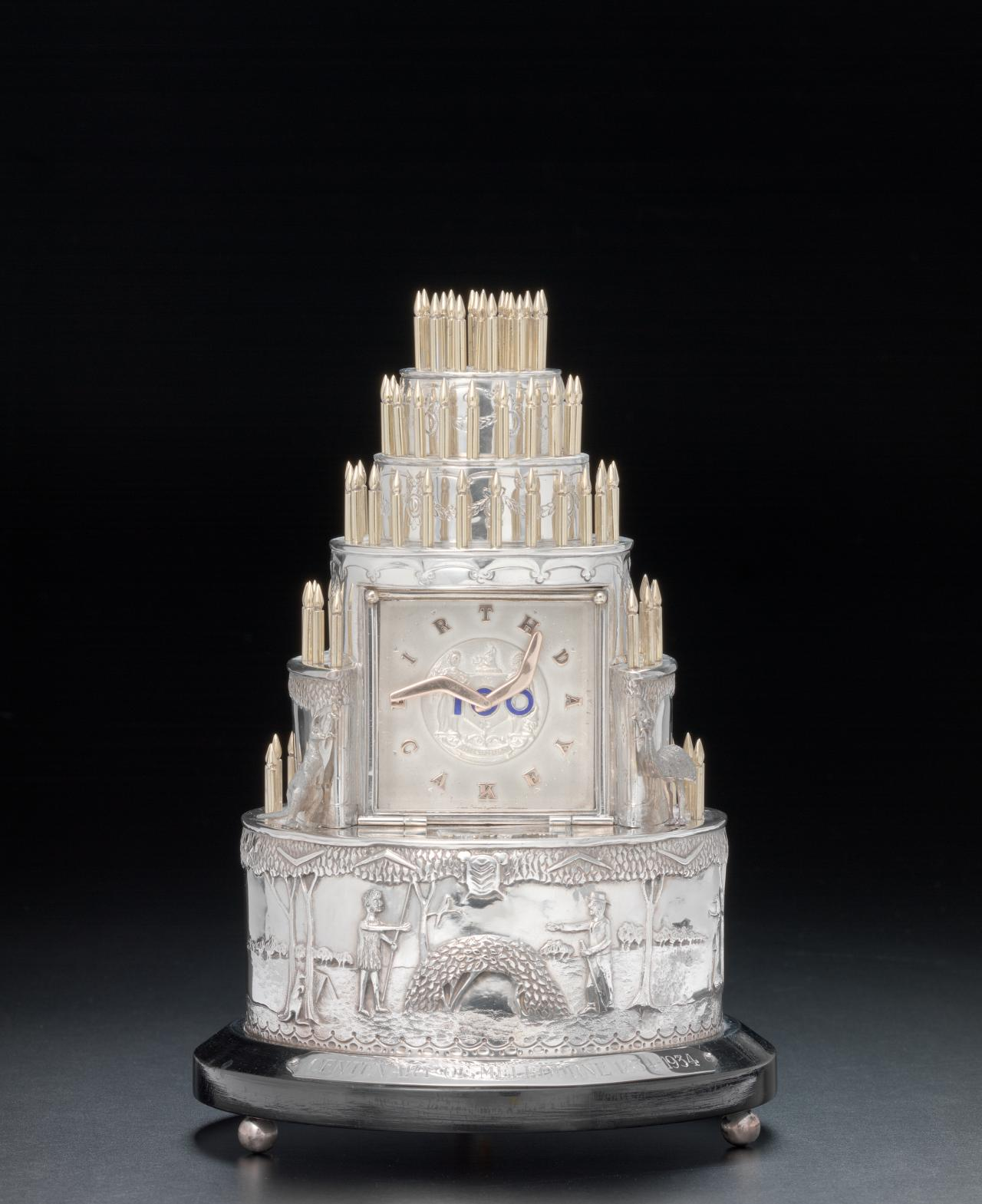
Centenary Cake Clock

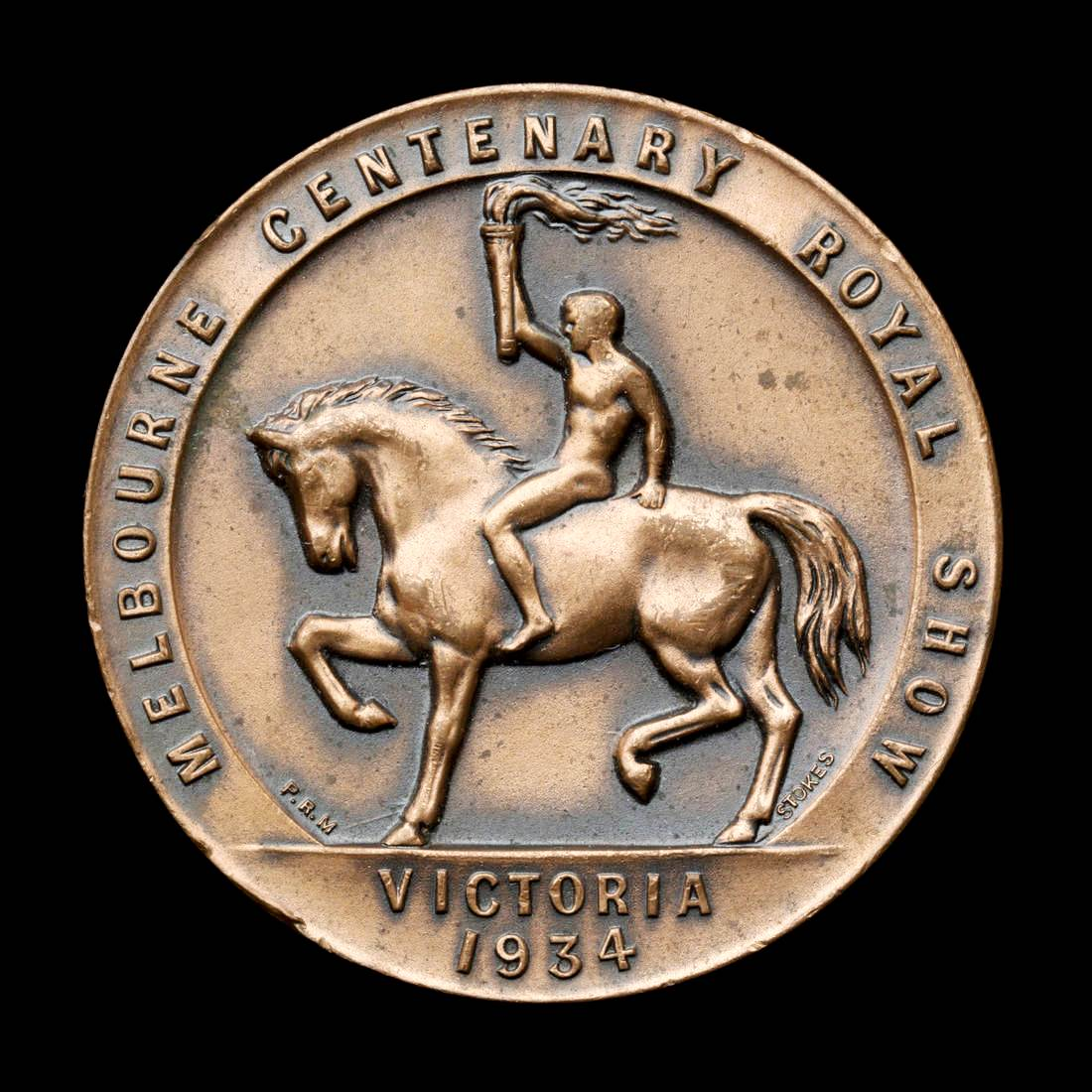
Royal Show Centenary Medal

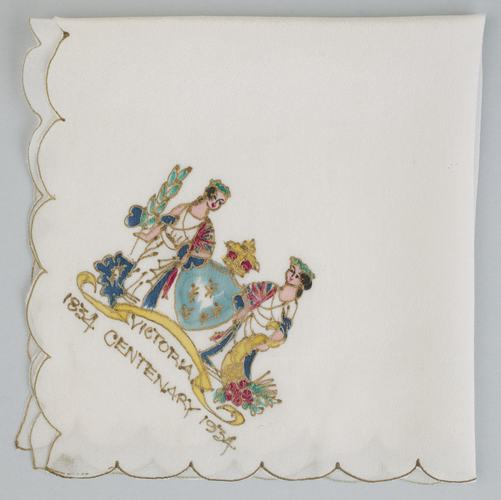
Centenary souvenir handkerchief

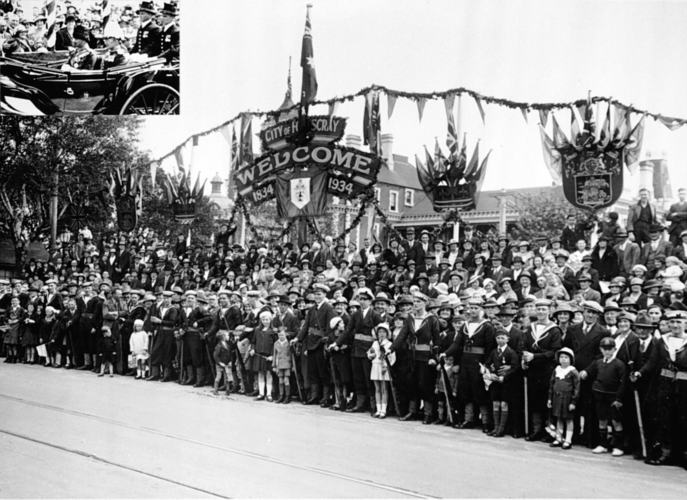
Duke of Gloucester arrival procession, City of Footscray's stand, St Kilda Road
