= Jim Mollison =

Scottish aviator (1905–1959)

James Allan Mollison MBE
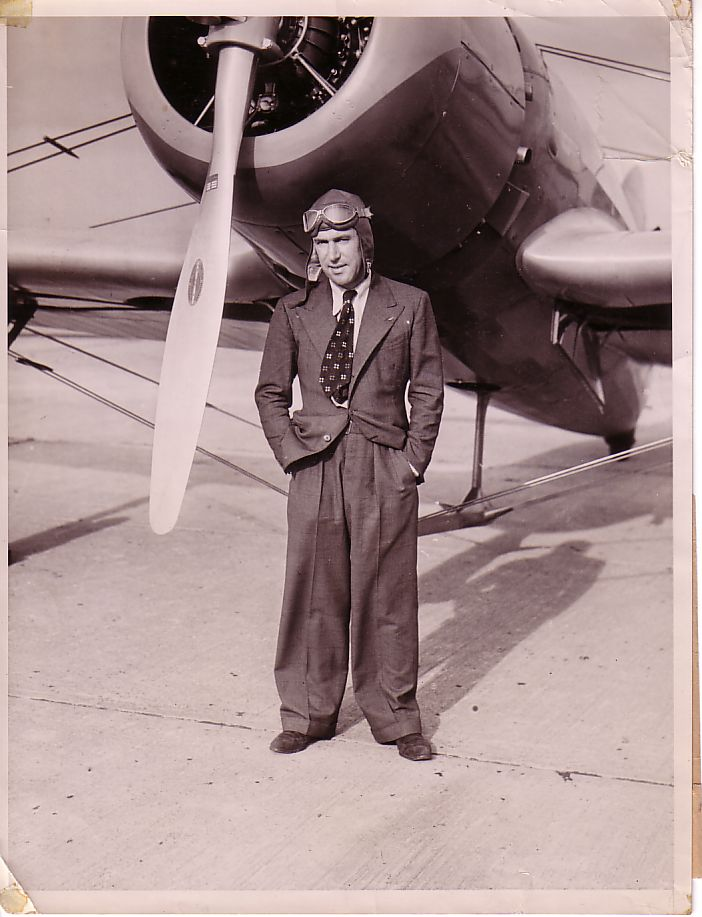
- Mollison at Floyd Bennett Field, 1936, and his Bellanca 28-90.
- Born: 19 April 1905; Glasgow, Scotland, United Kingdom
- Died: 30 October 1959 (aged 54); London, United Kingdom
- Occupation: Aviator
- Spouse: Amy Johnson (m. 1932; div. 1938)

James Allan Mollison MBE (19 April 1905 – 30 October 1959) was a British pioneer aviator from Glasgow, Scotland, who, flying solo or with his first wife, Amy Johnson, set many records during the rapid development of aviation in the 1930s.

== Early years ==
Mollison was born on 19 April 1905 in Glasgow, the only child of Hector Alexander Mollison, a consultant engineer, and Thomasina Macnee Addie (d. 1965). He was educated at The Glasgow Academy and Edinburgh Academy. He was attracted at an early age to flying. Obtaining his Royal Air Force (RAF) Short Service Commission at 18, he was the youngest officer in the service and, upon completion of training, was posted to India. He flew the Bristol F.2B on active service in Waziristan, taking part in the Pink's War operations.

== Aviation career ==
At the age of 22, Mollison became a flying instructor at the Central Flying School (CFS), again setting the record for being the youngest in this role. Shortly after, he transferred to the RAF Reserve and devoted his time to civil aviation. In 1928–29, he worked as an instructor with the South Australian Aero Club in Adelaide, leaving that position to become a pilot with Eyre Peninsular Airways and Australian National Airways.

Whilst gaining a reputation as a playboy, Mollison was a skilled pilot who, like many others, took to record breaking as a means of "making his name". In July to August 1931, he set a record time of 8 days, 19 hours for a flight from Australia to England and, in March 1932, a record for flying from England to Cape Town, South Africa in 4 days, 17 hours.

Mollison had flown commercially for Charles Kingsford Smith's ill-fated Australian National Airways. During one of his commercial flights, he met the equally famous aviator Amy Johnson, to whom he proposed only eight hours after meeting, and while still in the air. Johnson accepted; they married in July 1932. She then went off to break her husband's England to South Africa record. They were dubbed The Flying Sweethearts by the press and public.

Mollison continued to attempt aviation records. On 18 August 1932 he made an east-to-west solo trans-Atlantic flight of 31 hours, from Portmarnock, Ireland to Pennfield, New Brunswick, Canada, using a de Havilland Puss Moth called "The Heart's Content". In 1933, using the same aircraft, Mollison flew from England to Brazil in 3 days, 13 hours, staging through West Africa, the first solo east-west South Atlantic crossing. By then, he and his wife began to plan a record-breaking flight across the world. On 22 July 1933, they took off from Pendine Sands in South Wales on a non-stop flight to New York, but were forced to crash land in Bridgeport, Connecticut, just short of their target, after running out of fuel. He and his wife were both injured, and the plane broken apart by souvenir seekers.

In October 1934 the Mollisons took part in MacRobertson Air Race. Their de Havilland DH.88 Comet Black Magic led the competitors off the line and was leading at Baghdad, but they were forced to retire at Allahabad after having to use non-aviation fuel, which damaged their engines.

In November 1936 Mollison made his last major record attempt, a flight from Croydon to Cape Town, South Africa. This time he flew with a co-pilot, French aviator Édouard Corniglion-Molinier. The attempt ended with a forced landing some 160 km short of Cape Town.

The Mollisons' marriage had become strained; they were rivals for the same aviation records and Mollison was at times a heavy drinker. They divorced in 1938 and Amy Mollison resumed her maiden name.

== World War II ==
Mollison eventually served in the Air Transport Auxiliary (ATA) in World War II and was awarded an MBE for his warwork. Johnson also served in the ATA and was killed while ferrying an aircraft in 1941.

A notable incident occurred when Mollison flew as a co-pilot with Diana Barnato Walker. Their Anson was intercepted and shot at by Luftwaffe fighters. Although the aircraft was hit, the 12 passengers and crew were unhurt. On landing, Mollison's only concern was "how to get a cup of tea!".

In June 1941 Mollison and an ATA crew delivered Cunliffe-Owen OA-1 G-AFMB to Fort Lamy, Chad. The aircraft was fitted out as a personal transport for General De Gaulle. Jim Mollison was made a Member of the Order of the British Empire (MBE) for his services with the ATA.

== Postwar ==
Mollison later settled in London and ran a public house. He married Maria Clasina E. Kamphuis on 26 September 1949 at the Maidenhead Register Office.

Mollison abused alcohol and, in 1953, the Civil Aviation Authority Medical Board revoked his pilot's licence. His third wife Maria bought the Carisbrooke Hotel in Surbiton for him – a temperance hotel.

Suffering from acute alcoholism, he was admitted to The Priory, Roehampton, south-west London, where he died on 30 October 1959.

== Legacy ==
| Locality | Street name | Connection |
|---|---|---|
| Enfield | Mollison Avenue | Weston Aerospace premises |
| Edgware | Mollison Way | Former runway of Stag Lane Aerodrome |
| Wallington | Mollison Drive & Mollison Square | Former site of Beddington Aerodrome (see Croydon Airport) |
| Gravesend | Mollison Rise | Near site of former RAF Gravesend |
| Woodley | Mollison Close | Former site of Woodley Airfield |
| Meir | Mollison Road | Near site of Meir Aerodrome |

Also - Mildenhall, Suffolk. Jim Mollison Court (social housing). Close to Mildenhall airfield, the start for the 1934 England-Australia Air Race, that the Mollisons took part in.

Mollison was portrayed by Robert Newton in the 1942 film They Flew Alone.
