= USS Seattle =

USS Seattle may refer to one of these United States Navy named in honor of the city of Seattle, Washington.

- USS Seattle (ACR-11), a Tennessee-class armored cruiser launched in 1905 as Washington; renamed Seattle in 1916; struck in 1946
- USS Seattle (AOE-3), a Sacramento-class fast combat support ship launched in 1968; struck in 2005
