= Gee Bee =

Gee Bee may refer to:

- Granville Brothers Aircraft, an aircraft manufacturer
  - Gee Bee R-1, a racing plane built by Granville Brothers Aircraft
  - Gee Bee Sportster, family of sports aircraft built by Granville Brothers Aircraft
  - Gee Bee Model Y Senior Sportster, a sports aircraft built by Granville Brothers Aircraft
  - Gee Bee Model Z, a racing plane built by Granville Brothers Aircraft
- Gee Bee Department Stores
- Gee Bee (video game), a 1978 arcade game by Namco
- the nickname of the Finnish boxer Gunnar Bärlund
