= Granville Gee Bee Model A =

1929 American sport/training biplane

Gee Bee Model A
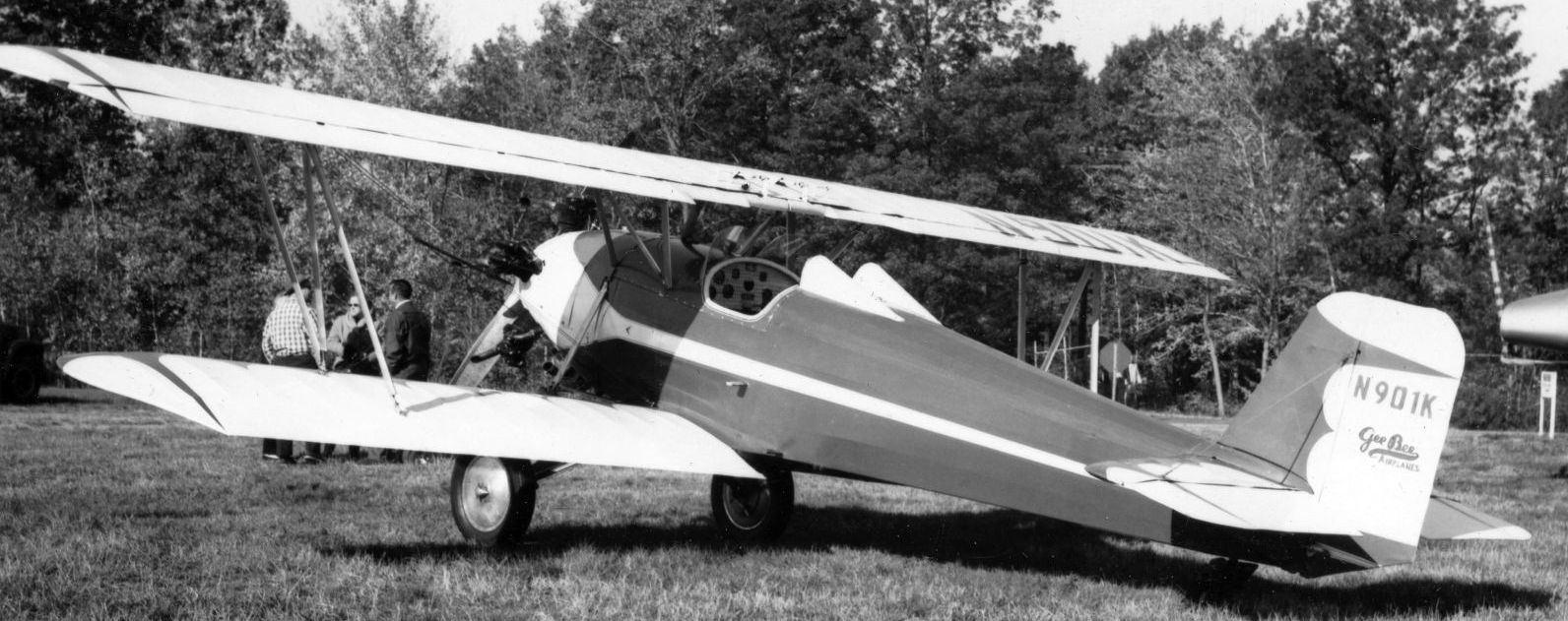

General information
- Type: sport/training biplane
- National origin: United States
- Manufacturer: Granville Brothers
- Designer: Zantford D. Granville
- Status: retired
- Primary user: private owners
- Number built: 9

History
- Manufactured: 1929–1930
- First flight: 3 May 1929

The Gee Bee Model A was an American two-seat open cockpit single-bay biplane developed by the Granville Brothers that first flew in 1929.

== Design and development ==
The Model A was first aircraft to be developed by Granville Brothers, and although first impressions are of a fairly conventional biplane, it had a number of unusual features.

The most obvious of these was the side-by-side seating arrangement, in contrast to most two seat biplanes which have the occupants in tandem, with the passenger in front or behind the pilot. Both occupants shared a single bench seat that spanned the width of the cockpit, which was fitted with twin headrests.

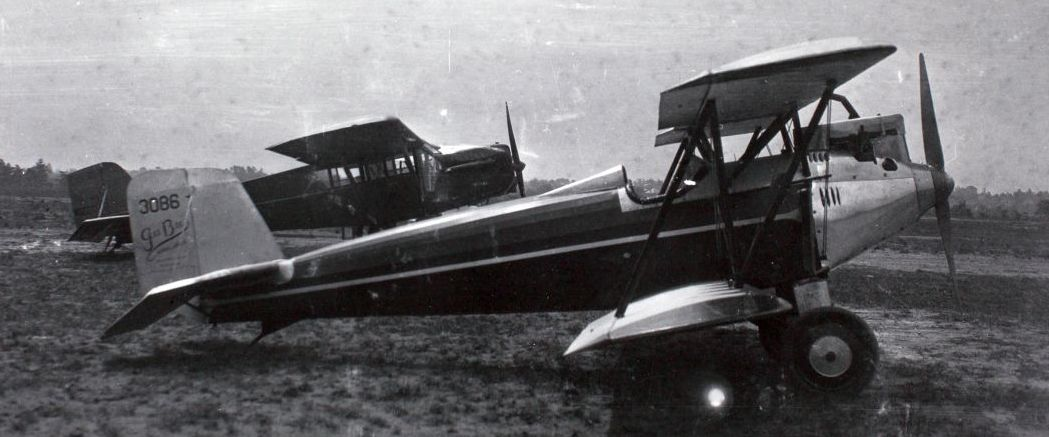
Prototype Model A with an inline 4-cylinder Cirrus engine

Because there wasn't a lot of leg room, instead of running the stick up from the floor between the pilot's legs or between the pilot and passenger, it was run horizontally, in a similar manner used on some later bomber and transport aircraft. For training purposes, the pilot could easily disconnect a student's controls to regain control of the aircraft. The fuselage structure was conventional for the time, being a Pratt truss built up from welded steel tubes with light wood battens to fair out the shape.

The prototype was initially fitted with a borrowed 50–56 hp (37–42 kW) Velie M-5 radial engine which didn't provide enough power and was soon replaced by an 80 hp (60 kW) Armstrong Siddeley Genet. Production examples were fitted with the 115–118 hp (86–88 kW) Kinner K-5 radial engine, while an inline four-cylinder Cirrus Ensign was also tested, and one Model A was bought by Louis Chevrolet to test the inverted inline four-cylinder 100 hp (75 kW) Chevrolet Chevrolair. Other engines offered included the 60 hp (45 kW) LeBlond 60-5D radial engine, the 110 hp (82 kW) Warner Scarab and the 85 hp (63 kW) de Havilland Gipsy I.

Although not yet named as such, the Model A had full span flaperons on the upper wing trailing edge, which combined Frise type ailerons and flaps to allow for both lateral control and good low speed handling without reducing the top speed. Spruce was used for both the spars and the ribs, with duraluminum tubes acting as compression ribs to provide longitudinal rigidity. The rudder and elevators were constructed in a similar manner to the wings, with spruce spars and ribs. Both were covered in doped fabric. The elevators and rudder were interchangeable, while the upper and lower outer wing panels were identical ahead of the rear spar, facilitating production and repair, a major consideration given the Granville Brother's prior history of running a mobile aircraft repair facility.

The outrigger undercarriage oleo struts were attached to the fuselage framework with brass universal joints, to ensure that in an accident, they would shear off without buckling the fuselage framework. This was soon tested when Granny found himself in a snowstorm in February 1930 while flying between exhibitions. He was forced to land the airplane blind and wiped the undercarriage off, splintered the prop, and damaging the two lower wing tip bows, but the fuselage remained undamaged. The prototype was initially fitted with a skid, however this was soon replaced with a self-locking tailwheel, and all of the subsequent Gee Bees would also use tailwheels. These could swivel freely for easier ground maneuvering, and would automatically lock into the fore and aft position for take off and landing.

From the beginning, it was seen as essential that the Model A be capable of being fitted with both skis and floats, so that they could use it to visit extended family. To install the floats, and in absence of the necessary rig, they hoisted the aircraft from a local bridge from the sandbar next to it. The famous aviator Charles Lindbergh was present to witness their tests with the Edo floats.

== Operational history ==
The FAA clearance that made the prototype legal to fly was received on 3 March 1929, however since they couldn't fly from the shop where it was built, they had to disassemble it and transport it to the field they were going to use, and reassemble it there, a process that took until the early hours of the next day. The red and silver Model A prototype made its first flight of eight minutes with the family patriarch Zantford Delbert Granville (known as Granny (Note: Both Grannie and Granny are used in the sources, however J. I. Granville spells it with a y.)) at the controls, beginning at 3:30 am on 4 March, with neither lights nor parachute. Asked why he didn't wait for sunrise, Granny said: "I wanted to test her without a crowd of pessimistic onlookers".

The Civil Aeronautics Authority (the precursor to today's FAA) granted the Gee Bee Model A the group 2 Approved Type Certificate 2-194 for 8 production aircraft, with serials to run from P-1 to P-8, excluding the prototype. A group 2 certificate was often used when production numbers were expected to remain small, or to limit the cost of certifying the aircraft.

Contemporary sources note that it was the first Boston-built aircraft to fly, but despite considerable local enthusiasm, the Wall Street crash of 1929 and the beginning of Great Depression killed any chance it would have had at making substantial sales. Despite the fame of the later aircraft, more Model As were built than any other Gee Bee model.

A blue and gold Model A was bought by Maud Tait, the first of several Gee Bees she flew. She gained considerable fame, winning several important races and setting a number of records in the later Model Y Senior Sportster and Model E Sportster monoplanes.

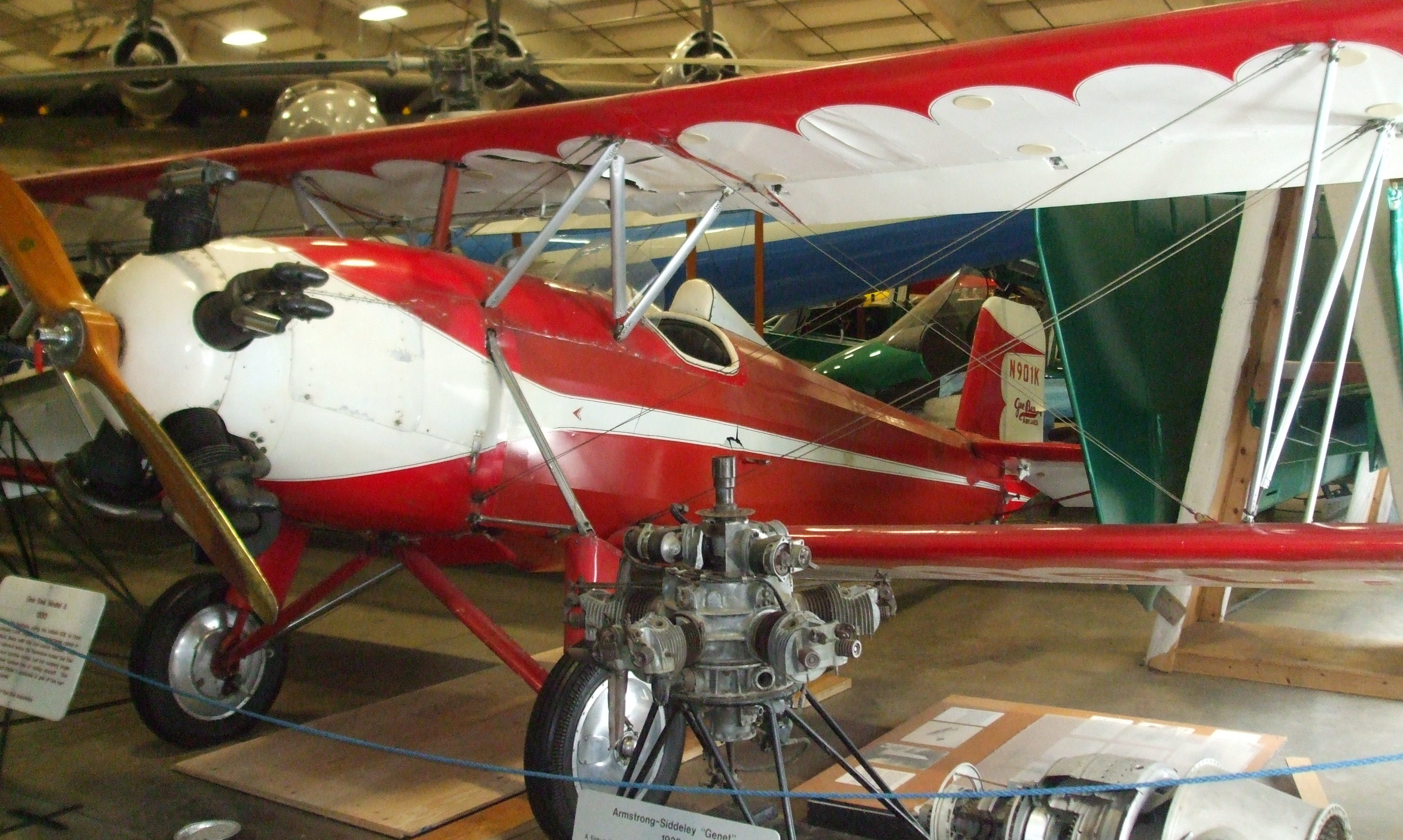
Gee Bee Model A at the New England Air Museum

== Surviving aircraft ==
Only two original Gee Bee aircraft survive, one of which is a Model A biplane. With the exception of the Q.E.D. which is on display in Mexico, all other Gee Bees, both flying and on display are replicas.

- Msn P.8 N901K (formerly NC45V, NC15642 and NC901K), the sole surviving Model A, and the last example to have been built, is in storage at the New England Air Museum in Windsor Locks, Connecticut.

== Specifications (Gee Bee Model A) ==
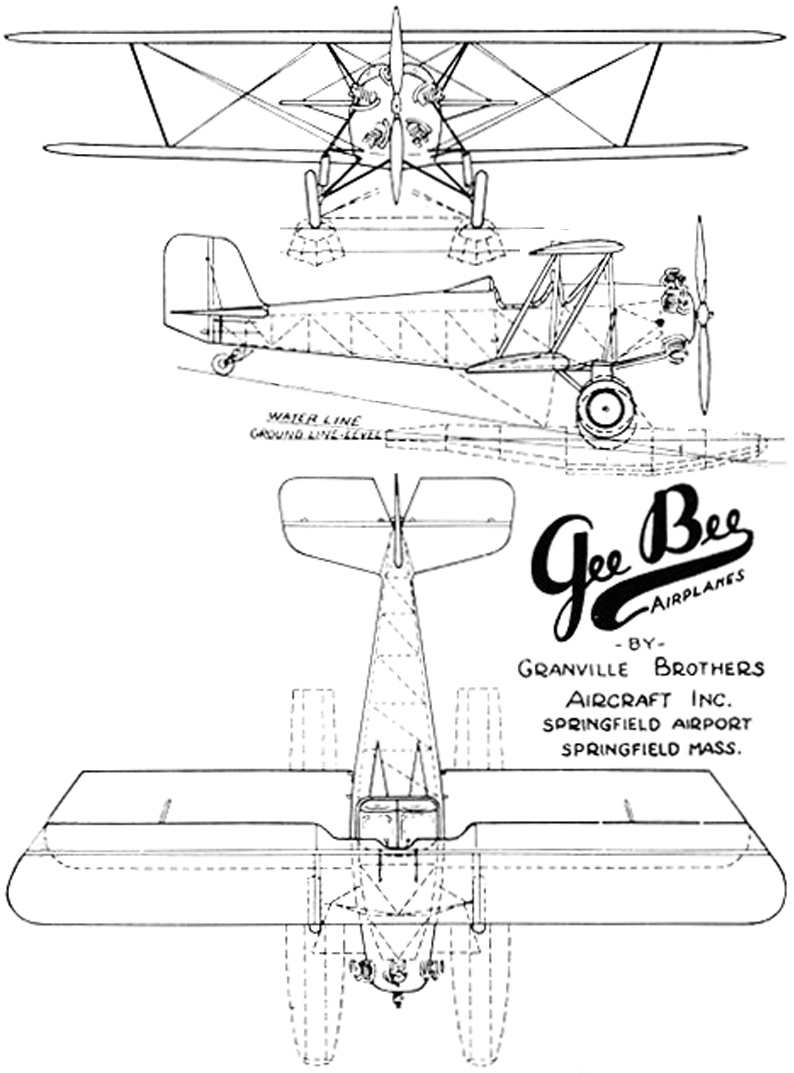
3-view of Model A from Aero Digest April 1931

Data from Aero Digest

General characteristics

- Crew: One
- Capacity: One passenger
- Length: 20 ft 7 in (6.27 m)
- Upper wingspan: 29 ft 2 in (8.89 m)
- Upper wing chord: 45 in (1.1 m)
- Upper wing dihedral: 0.0°
- Lower wingspan: 26 ft 3 in (8.00 m)
- Lower wing chord: 45 in (1.1 m)
- Lower wing dihedral: 2.5°
- Height: 8 ft 6 in (2.59 m)
- Wing area: 185 sq ft (17.2 m^{2})
- Airfoil: Clark Y
- Empty weight: 1,060 lb (481 kg)
- Gross weight: 1,650 lb (748 kg)
- Fuel capacity: 26 US gal (98 L; 22 imp gal)
- Undercarriage track: 73 in (1.9 m)
- Powerplant: 1 × Kinner K-5 5-cylinder air-cooled radial engine, 118 hp (88 kW)
- Propellers: 2-bladed Hartzell fixed pitch wood propeller OR Hamilton Standard fixed pitch metal propeller, 7 ft 7 in (2.31 m) diameter

Performance

- Maximum speed: 108 mph (174 km/h, 94 kn)
- Cruise speed: 92 mph (148 km/h, 80 kn)
- Minimum control speed: 30 mph (48 km/h, 26 kn)
- Range: 400 mi (640 km, 350 nmi)
- Service ceiling: 11,000 ft (3,400 m)
- Rate of climb: 800 ft/min (4.1 m/s) initial rate of climb
- Time to altitude: 10 minutes 0 seconds to 5,100 ft (1,600 m)
- Wing loading: 8.9 lb/sq ft (43 kg/m^{2})
- Power/mass: 16.5 lb/hp (10.0 kg/kW)

== See also ==
- 1929 in aviation

=== Aircraft of comparable role, configuration and era ===
- Arrow Sport
- Blackburn Bluebird IV
- Caspar C 33
- Robinson Redwing
- Waco A series

=== Related lists ===
- List of aircraft
- List of civil aircraft
