= GeeBee C-8 Eightster =

GeeBee C-8 "Eightster"

General information
- National origin: United States
- Manufacturer: Granville Brothers Aircraft
- Status: Prototype only
- Number built: 1 (not completed)

History
- Developed from: Gee Bee C Sportster

The C-8 Eightster was a single-engine airliner developed by Granville Brothers Aircraft which did not go into production.

== Design and development ==
The C-8 was an uncompleted design for a single-engine airliner. It was a wire-braced low-wing monoplane with fixed landing gear and a radial engine. Passenger entry was via a small door on the left hand side of the fuselage. Passenger visibility came from three semi-circular windows along each side. The main landing gear was faired, similar to the Gee-Bee racers.

The Granville brothers also designed a series of sportster derivatives, including the C-4 Fourster and C-6 Sixster. The C-8 was the only one to be constructed, being partially completed by the time the company went into liquidation.

== Variants ==
Gee Bee C Sportster
Single-seat sport / racing aircraft; basis for the C family.
C-4 Fourster
Four-seater powered by a 400 hp (300 kW) Pratt & Whitney R-985 Wasp Junior, not built.
C-6 Sixster
Six-seater, not built.
C-8 Eightster
Eight-seater, to have been powered by either a Pratt & Whitney R-1690 Hornet or a 700 hp (520 kW) Wright R-1820. The prototype was partially complete at the time of Granville Brothers bankruptcy.

== Specifications (C-8) ==
Data from

General characteristics

- Crew: one
- Capacity: eight
- Length: 32 ft 11 in (10.03 m)
- Wingspan: 47 ft 9 in (14.55 m)
- Powerplant: 1 × Pratt & Whitney R-1690 Hornet 9-cyl. air-cooled radial piston engine, 700 hp (520 kW)
- Propellers: 2-bladed variable pitch metal propeller

Performance

- Maximum speed: 255 mph (410 km/h, 222 kn)
- Cruise speed: 190 mph (310 km/h, 170 kn)
- Range: 870 mi (1,400 km, 760 nmi)

== See also ==
Aircraft of comparable role, configuration, and era

- Lockheed Vega
