= Granville Gee Bee R-6 =

1930s sportplane series

Gee Bee R-6H
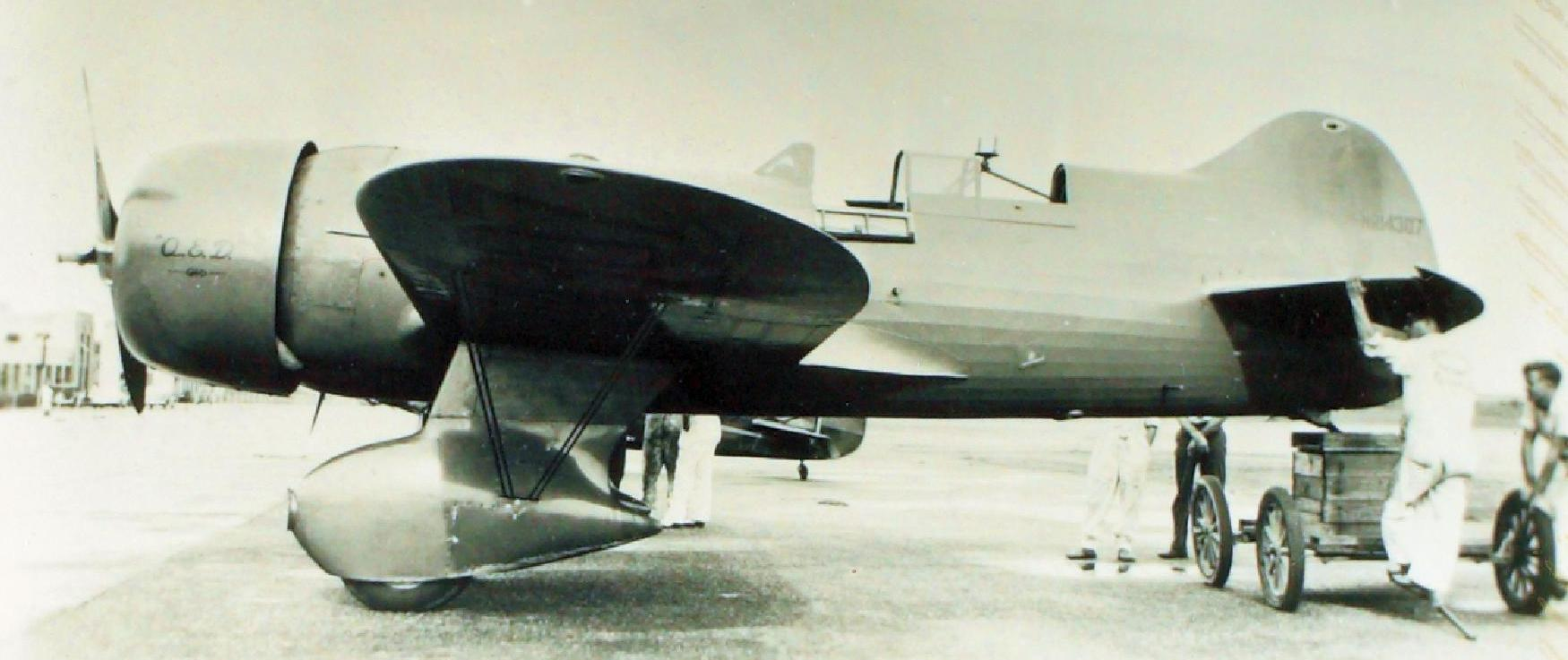

General information
- Type: Touring/air racing
- National origin: United States
- Manufacturer: Granville, Miller & De Lackner
- Designer: Zanford Granville; Howell Miller; Don Delackner
- Status: retired
- Number built: 1

History
- First flight: 1934
- Developed from: Granville Gee Bee R-5

The Granville Gee Bee R-6 International Super Sportster, named "Q.E.D." (Latin: quod erat demonstrandum "it is proven"), and later named "Conquistador del Cielo" (Spanish: "sky conqueror"), was the last in a series of racing and touring monoplane aircraft from the Granville Brothers. The R-6H was dogged with bad luck throughout its career and never finished any race it entered.

== Development ==
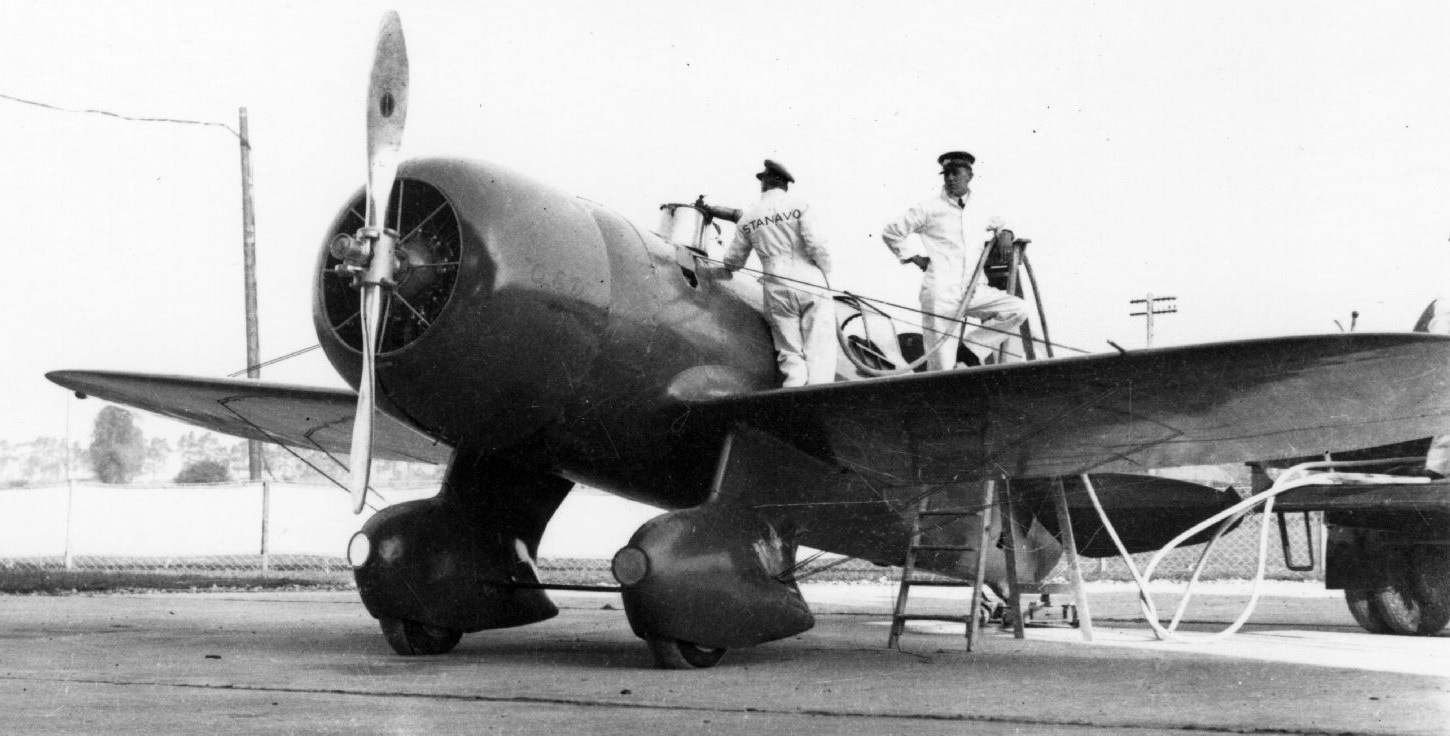
Q.E.D. being prepared for the MacRobertson Air Race that it was built for.

Design work on the Gee Bee R-6 had begun in 1933, but the firm went bankrupt shortly afterwards in October 1933. Then, on 11 February 1934, Zanford Granville died in Spartanburg, South Carolina, when he crashed in the Gee Bee Model E Sportster he was delivering. This aircraft was intended to finance a new company to be based in New York called Granville, Miller & De Lackner. The R-6H would eventually be completed for Floyd B. Odlum, on behalf of Jacqueline Cochran for the MacRobertson Air Race in 1934. The touring aircraft was designed with large fuel tanks to handle the long legs needed for the England to Australia race. A Curtiss Conqueror was the engine preferred by Cochran, but Curtiss-Wright was unable to deliver one in time, and the Pratt & Whitney Hornet originally intended for the design was substituted to make the race delivery date.

== Design ==
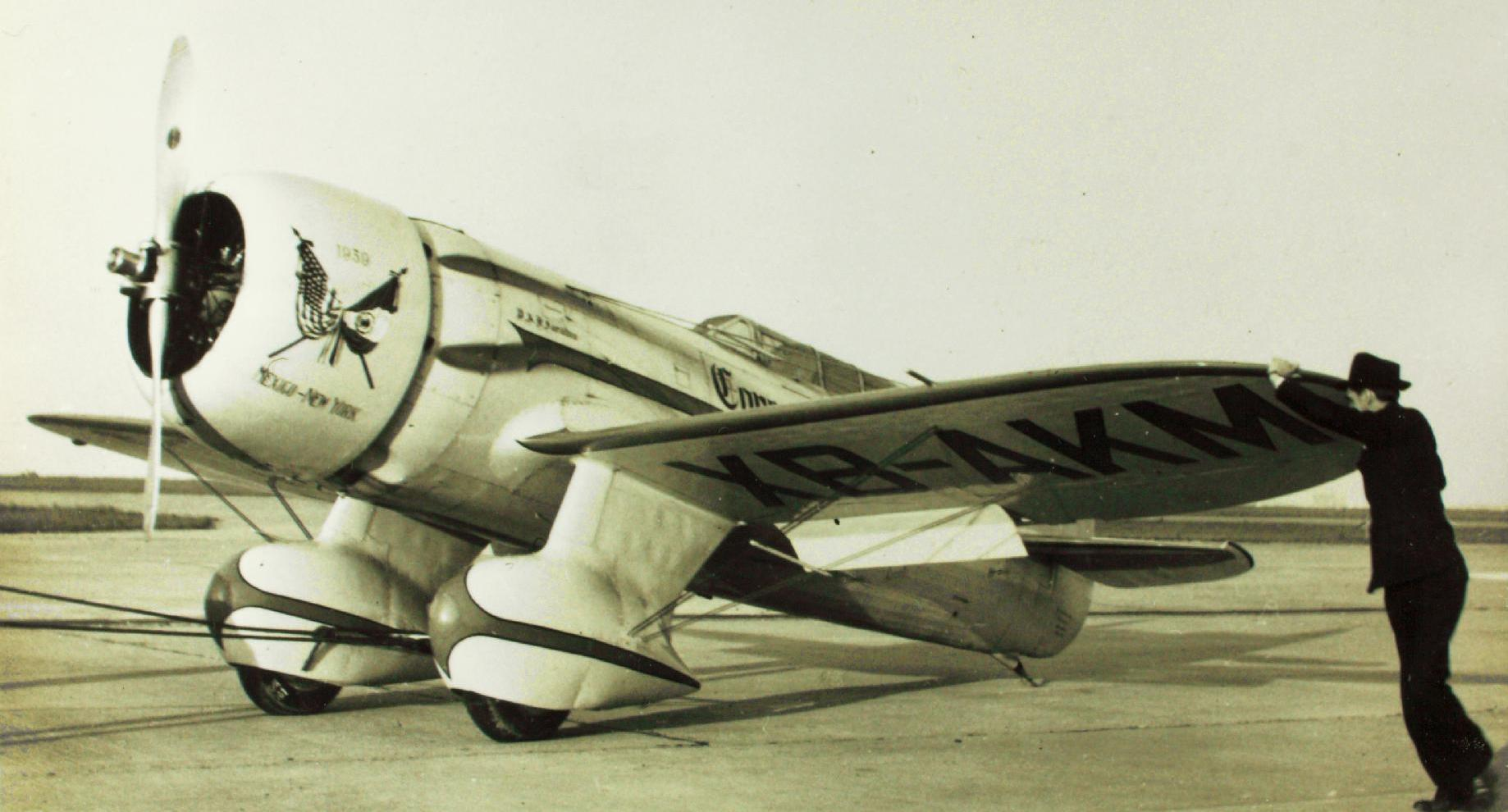
R-6H XB-AKM Conquistador del Cielo showing the later simplified flaps

The Gee Bee R-6 shares the same general shape and overall design as the better known Granville Gee Bee R-1 Super Sportster racer, but was nearly 10 ft (3.0 m) larger in span and length. As built the aircraft was powered by a 675 hp (503 kW) Pratt & Whitney Hornet 9-cylinder air cooled radial engine enclosed in a NACA cowling.

The wings were built around a pair of spruce spars, with the front spars split into upper and lower beams while the rear spars were a single beam. Ribs were also spruce, and the entire wing was skinned with plywood and braced to the fuselage and undercarriage with streamlined wires. Split flaps that functioned somewhat similar to Zap flaps with an extra hinge line mid-chord were installed between the ailerons and the fuselage. After problems with these during the MacRobertson Air Race, they were redesigned without the extra hinge.

The fuselage form followed an ideal teardrop shape calculated to minimize drag and was built up from welded chromium-molybdenum alloy steel tubes with plywood formers and spruce stringers. This was then covered with sheet aluminium panels forward, and fabric covering aft. The fin was integral with the fuselage structure, while the rudder and cantilevered elevators were constructed in a similar manner to the wings with a plywood covering. Tandem cockpits provided space for two under an extended greenhouse canopy.

Although most contemporaries were already moving to retractable undercarriage, the R-6 persisted with the spatted and faired units common to their previous designs, although to save time, the actual gear legs were borrowed from the Curtiss A-12 Shrike.

== Operational history ==
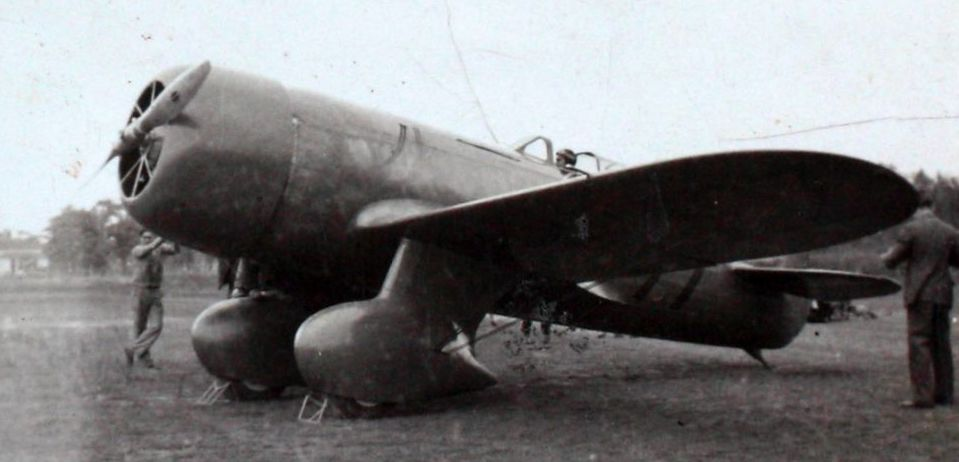
Q.E.D. with race number 77 for the 1934 Bendix

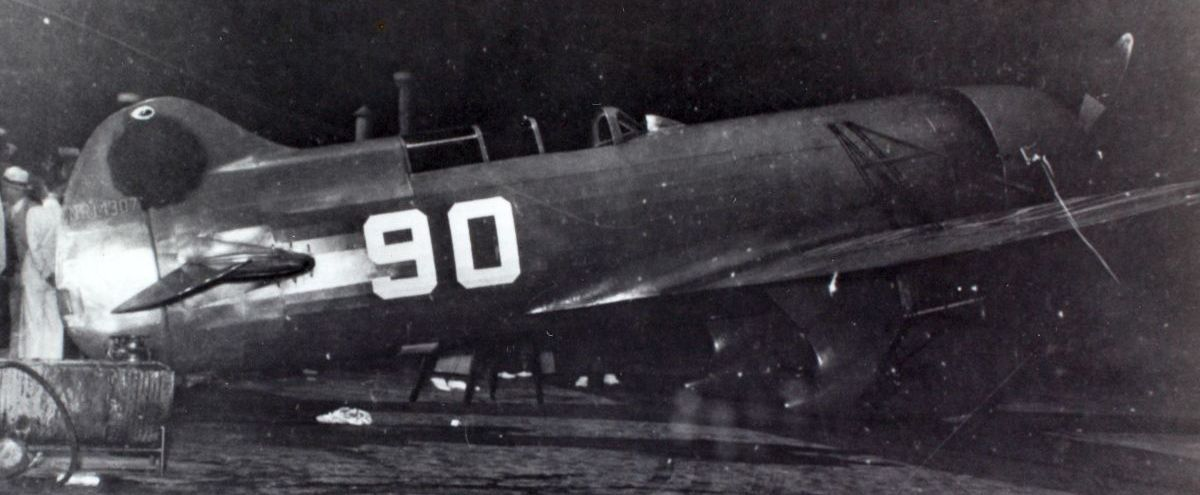
Q.E.D. during the 1935 Bendix Races

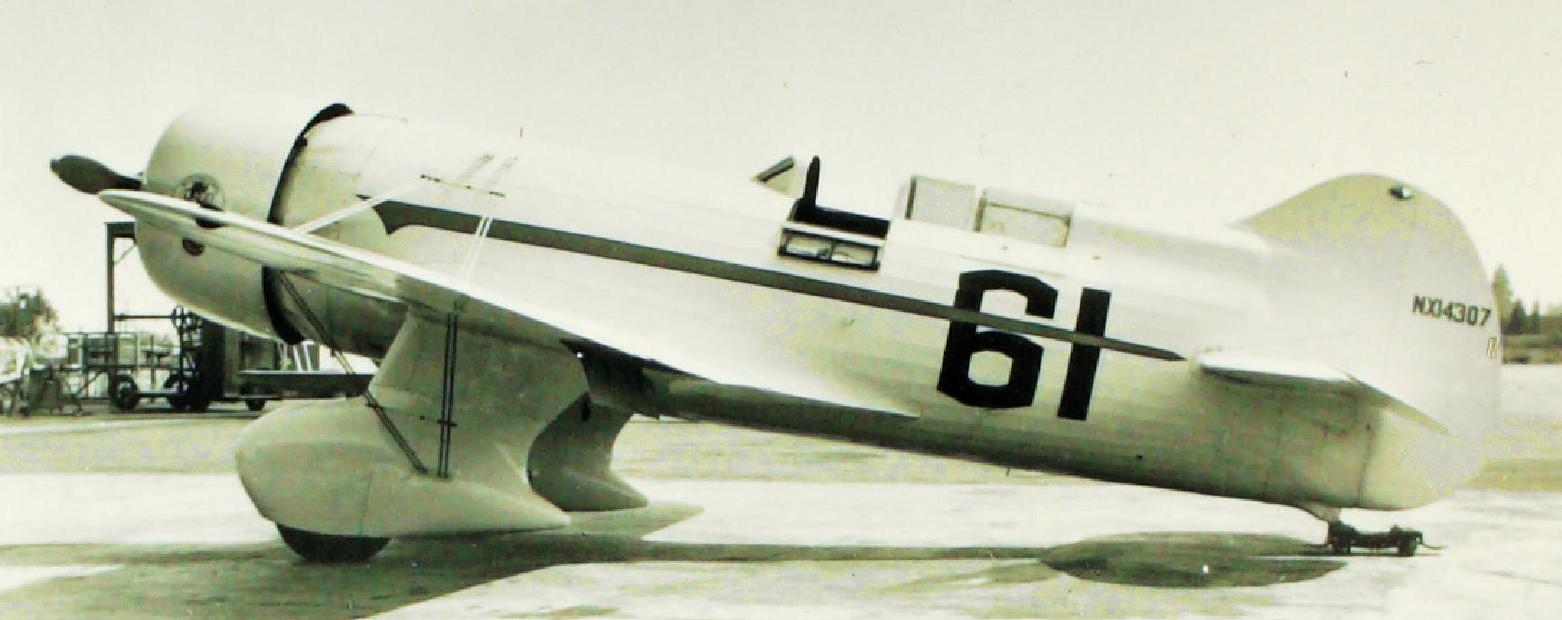
R-6H ready for 1938 Bendix Race with race number 61

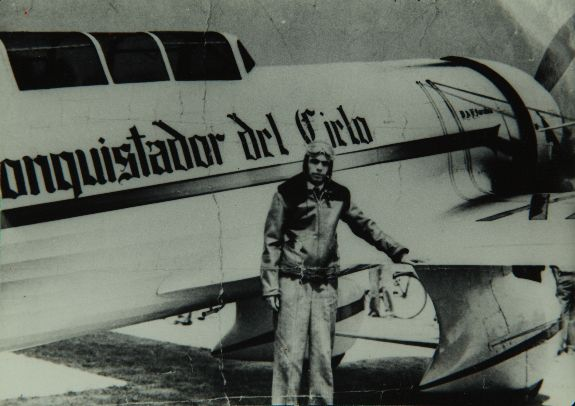
Francisco Sarabia with the Conquistador del Cielo

=== 1934 Bendix Race ===
While en route to the Bendix Race at Des Moines, Iowa Lee Gehlbach had the cowling come loose and it pulled into the prop. He continued without the cowling and a new modified one was dispatched but the replacement suffered the same fate during the race and he was forced to drop out.

=== 1934 MacRobertson Air Race ===
After having their entry delayed because the British authorities had trouble accepting the limited amount of testing the R-6H had undergone was adequate for a commercial aircraft, and enduring insults in the British press (who dubbed it the "HeeBee GeeBee"), Jacqueline Cochran and Wesley Smith made it as far as Bucharest, Romania, the end of their first leg in the bright green and orange Q.E.D., when a malfunctioning flap and a damaged stabilizer delayed them until they were forced to drop out.

=== 1935 Bendix Race ===
Royal Leonard was forced down with an engine failure and had to land in Wichita, Kansas, shortly after the Gee Bee R-1/R-2 Hybrid Intestinal Fortitude disintegrated in flight, killing its pilot.

=== 1936 Thompson Trophy race ===
In the 1936 Thompson Trophy despite most of the major contenders having dropped out before the race, Lee Miles was forced down with an engine failure on lap 11 of 15, after lagging behind Michel Détroyat's winning Caudron C.460. The aircraft was then stored in Tucson, Arizona.

=== 1938 Bendix Race ===
After being bought by aircraft dealer Charles Babb, the aircraft was repainted cream overall with a green stripe, and fitted with a more powerful 950 hp (710 kW) Pratt & Whitney Hornet with a 14:1 supercharger. While being flown by George Armisted to the race it suffered another engine failure but was relatively undamaged, However, his troubles were not over as during the race, oil temperatures soared, he lost oil pressure, was experiencing icing and his radio failed all of which ended his run in Winslow, Arizona.

=== 1939 Mexico City to New York City record flight ===
Francisco Sarabia Tinoco set a record for a non-stop flight from Mexico City to New York City in 10 hours and 47 minutes on 24 May. He had bought the R-6H from Babb in late September 1938 and repainted it bright white with a red fuselage stripe, with the Mexican registration XB-AKM, and renamed it the Conquistador del Cielo.

=== 1939 Return flight ===
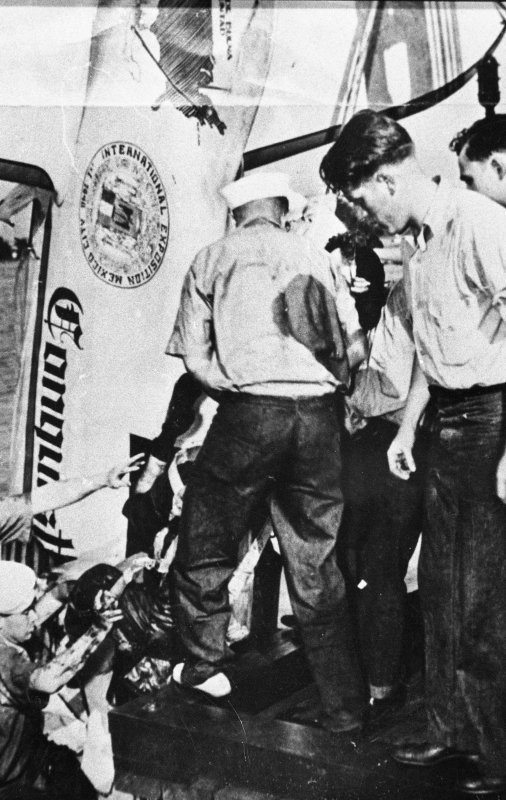
Recovery of the wreckage of the Gee Bee R-6H

While Francisco Sarabia was taking off with a full fuel load for the return flight to Mexico from Bolling Airfield in Washington D.C., and in full view of his family, his engine failed due to an oily rag having been sucked into the carburettor intake, and he plummeted into the Potomac River, where he was trapped by the collapsed cockpit structure and died before his aircraft could be extricated from the mud of the river bed. The wreckage of his aircraft was recovered and brought back to Mérida, Yucatán where it was placed in a museum. A Mexican postage stamp was issued in his honor in 2000, featuring a picture of Sarabia and the Conquistador del Cielo

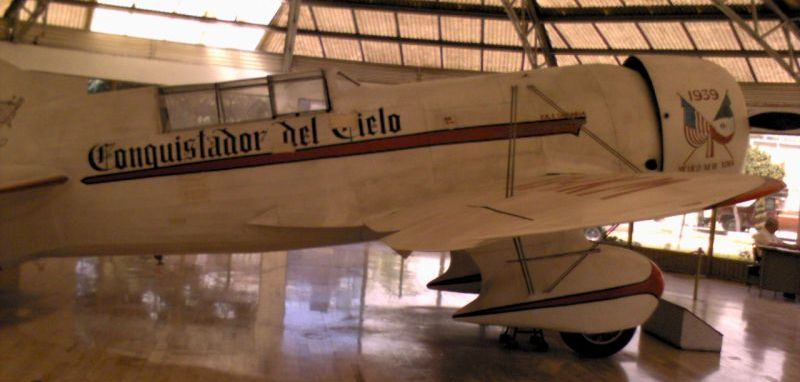
Conquistidor del Cielo at the Museo Francisco Sarabia

== Variants ==
Gee Bee R-5
Drawings were completed on 5 January 1934 of what would be an unbuilt precursor to the R-6, with a 850 hp (630 kW) Pratt & Whitney Hornet air-cooled radial engine. The R-5 differed primarily in being fitted with only a single seat, and drawings of the R-5 are frequently misidentified as that of the R-6. Span was 3 in (76 mm) smaller, while the length was 56 in (1,400 mm) shorter, most noticeably around the firewall. Like the R-6, the R-5 was to have been fitted with flaps, while access to the cockpit would have been through a large door on the fuselage side as on previous racers, rather than through the canopy.
Gee Bee R-6C (Conqueror)
Unbuilt version with a supercharged 700 hp (520 kW) Curtiss Conqueror V-12 inline water-cooled engine. The R-6C would have had a similar engine installation to the Northrop Gamma 2G also flown by Cochran. The installation of a pressurized cockpit was studied at Cochran's request but was not proceeded with.
Gee Bee R-6H (Hornet)
As built, initially powered by a 675 hp (503 kW) Pratt & Whitney Hornet air-cooled radial engine. Other versions of the Hornet were also installed, providing up to 950 hp (710 kW).

== Surviving aircraft ==
The sole surviving Gee Bee R-6H racer, the Conquistador del Cielo underwent a major restoration in Mexico City in 1972, and is on display at a museum built specifically to honor Francisco Sarabia, the Museo Francisco Sarabia, located in Ciudad Lerdo.

A replica of the R-6H with considerable modifications from the original, including using a 1,425 hp (1,063 kW) Wright R-1820 Cyclone was built and first flew on 26 September 2013.

== Specifications (Granville Gee Bee R-6H) ==
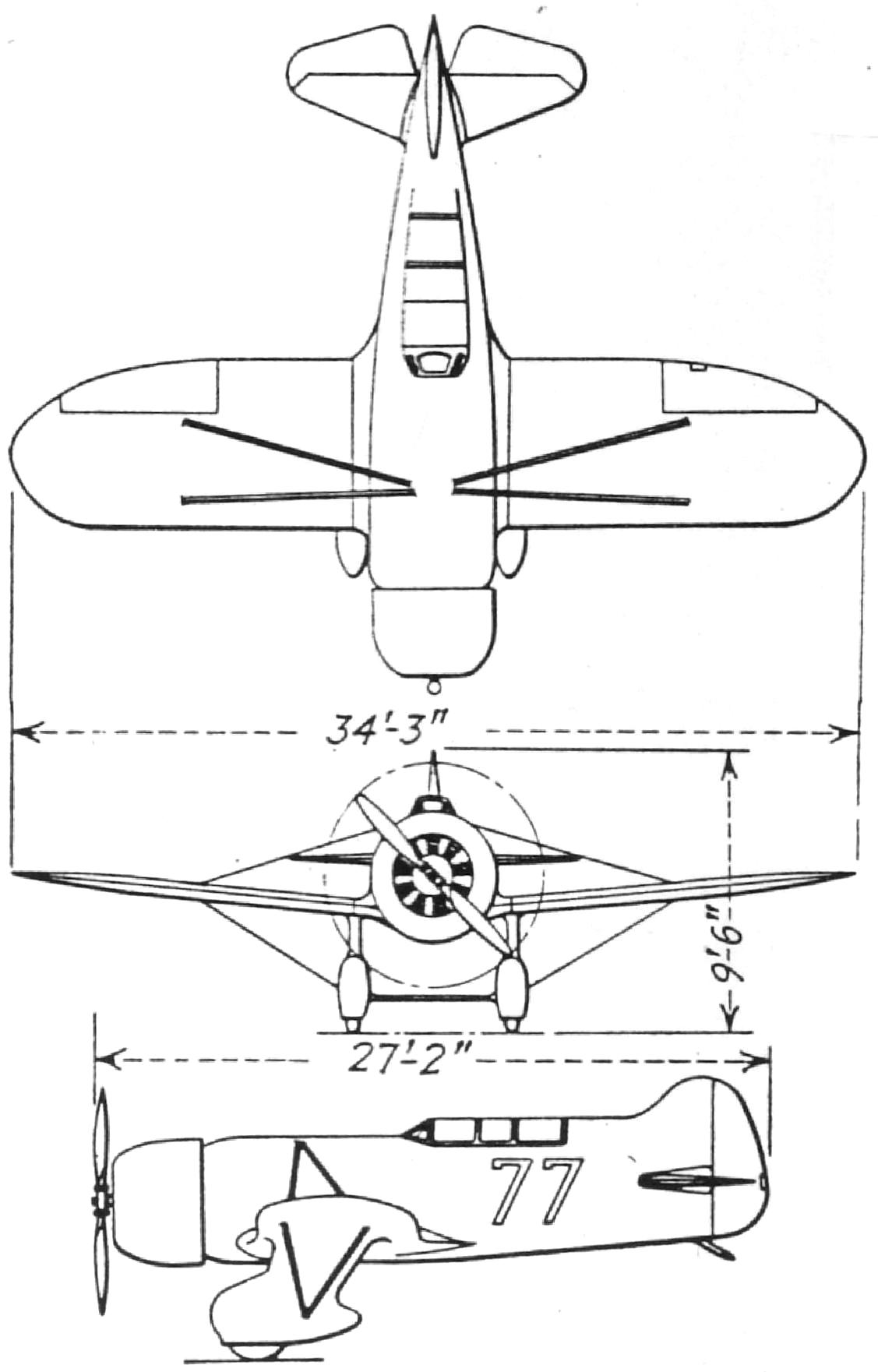
Granville Gee Bee R-6H 3-view drawing

Data from A legacy of speed - The Gee Bee Racers

General characteristics

- Crew: One
- Capacity: One passenger
- Length: 27 ft 2 in (8.28 m)
- Wingspan: 34 ft 3 in (10.44 m)
- Wing dihedral: 4.5°
- Height: 9 ft 6 in (2.90 m)
- Wing area: 212 sq ft (19.7 m^{2})
- Airfoil: modified NACA M-6 section
- Empty weight: 3,144 lb (1,426 kg)
- Gross weight: 6,500 lb (2,948 kg)
- Fuel capacity: 400 US gal (1,500 L; 330 imp gal)
- Oil capacity: 28 US gal (110 L; 23 imp gal)
- Undercarriage track: 90 in (2.3 m)
- Powerplant: 1 × Pratt & Whitney Hornet SD 1,690 cu in (27.7 L) 9-cylinder air-cooled radial engine, 675 hp (503 kW)
- Propellers: 2-bladed Hamilton Standard controllable pitch propeller

Performance

- Maximum speed: 295 mph (475 km/h, 256 kn)
- Cruise speed: 260 mph (420 km/h, 230 kn)
- Wing loading: 36 lb/sq ft (180 kg/m^{2}) at maximum weight

== See also ==
- 1934 in aviation

=== Aircraft of comparable role, configuration and era ===
- Bellanca 28-70
- Lockheed Model 8 Sirius
- Northrop Gamma

=== Related lists ===
- List of racing aircraft
