= Royal Leonard =

American aviator (1905–1962)

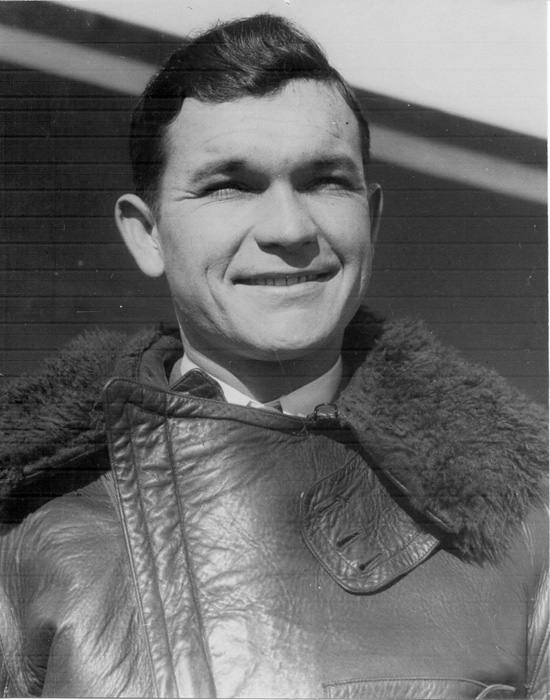
- Born: April 3, 1905; Wisconsin
- Died: June 21, 1962 (aged 57); Los Angeles, California
- Resting place: California
- Spouse: Maxine (d. 1990)
- Children: Royal S. Leonard (1945 - present)

Captain Royal Leonard (April 3, 1905 – June 21, 1962), was a Texan pilot who previously flew for TWA between 1935 and 1941. He was first the personal pilot of Zhang Xueliang, and then that of Chiang Kai-shek. He was born on April 3, 1905, in Wisconsin.

In 1935 Leonard was first to fly the new Gee Bee Q.E.D. in the Bendix Race. However, Leonard was forced to land in Wichita, Kansas, due to engine troubles.

In 1942, he published an autobiography called I Flew for China.

He died on June 21, 1962, in Los Angeles, California, at age 57.

== Legacy ==
In 2011, Barry S. Martin published a book titled Forgotten Aviator: The Adventures of Royal Leonard.
