= Robert Hall (aircraft designer) =

Robert L Hall
- Born: 1905; Taunton, Massachusetts
- Died: 1991 (aged 85–86)
- Education: University of Michigan
- Occupations: Aircraft designer, Aircraft Racing
- Known for: Designer of the Gee Bee Model Z

Robert L. Hall (1906–1991) was an American air racing pilot and aircraft designer.

== Career ==
Robert Leicester Hall was born in Taunton, Massachusetts 1905. After graduating in 1927 from the University of Michigan, with a degree in Mechanical Engineering, he joined the Granville Brothers Aircraft, where he was the chief engineer. He designed the Gee Bee Model Z racer, the "City of Springfield," which swept the competition in every contest in the National Air Races of 1931. On September 5, Hall flew the Gee Bee Z to victory in the General Tire and Rubber Trophy race. Lowell Bayles flew the aircraft the next day to victory in the free-for-all event.

== The Springfield Aircraft Co. ==
Hall left the Granville Brothers in 1927 to form The Springfield Aircraft Co and moved operations to the Bowles Agawam Airport. There he designed the Bulldog racing aircraft, which he went on to race at the 1932 National Air Races, finished sixth at a speed of 215.5 mph. Afterwards there was speculation that its experimental Hamilton Standard propeller prevented the Wasp engine from running at full power. Hall was so disappointed with its performance that he dismantled and scrapped the plane after that race. He also designed the Cicada racer, which was scheduled to race at the 1932 National Air Races by owner Frank Lynch but did not start the race due to engine problems.

== The Grumman years ==
Robert Hall later joined Grumman, where he helped design and test a series of planes that proved a major force during World War II. Serving as Chief Engineer and lead flight test pilot, he helped design and made the first flights of the F4F Wildcat, the G-21 Goose in 1937, the XP-50 in 1941, the F6F Hellcat in 1942, the F7F Tigercat in 1943 and the F8F Bearcat in 1944. On May 14, 1941 while flying the XP-50, it experienced an inflight turbocharger explosion while over Long Island Sound. Hall was forced to parachute to safety. As Grumman's chief engineer and vice president, he was instrumental in the design of the F9F Panther, F9F Cougar, F10F Jaguar and F11F Tiger jet fighters and the Gulfstream I executive aircraft. He retired from Grumman in 1970.

== Legacy ==
The Hall Bulldog Project is a project attempting to recreate the V-2 Bulldog.

His son Eric Hall is co-founder of Hall Spars, which manufacturers sailboat rigging.
