= Granville Gee Bee Model Y Senior Sportster =

Model Y Senior Sportster
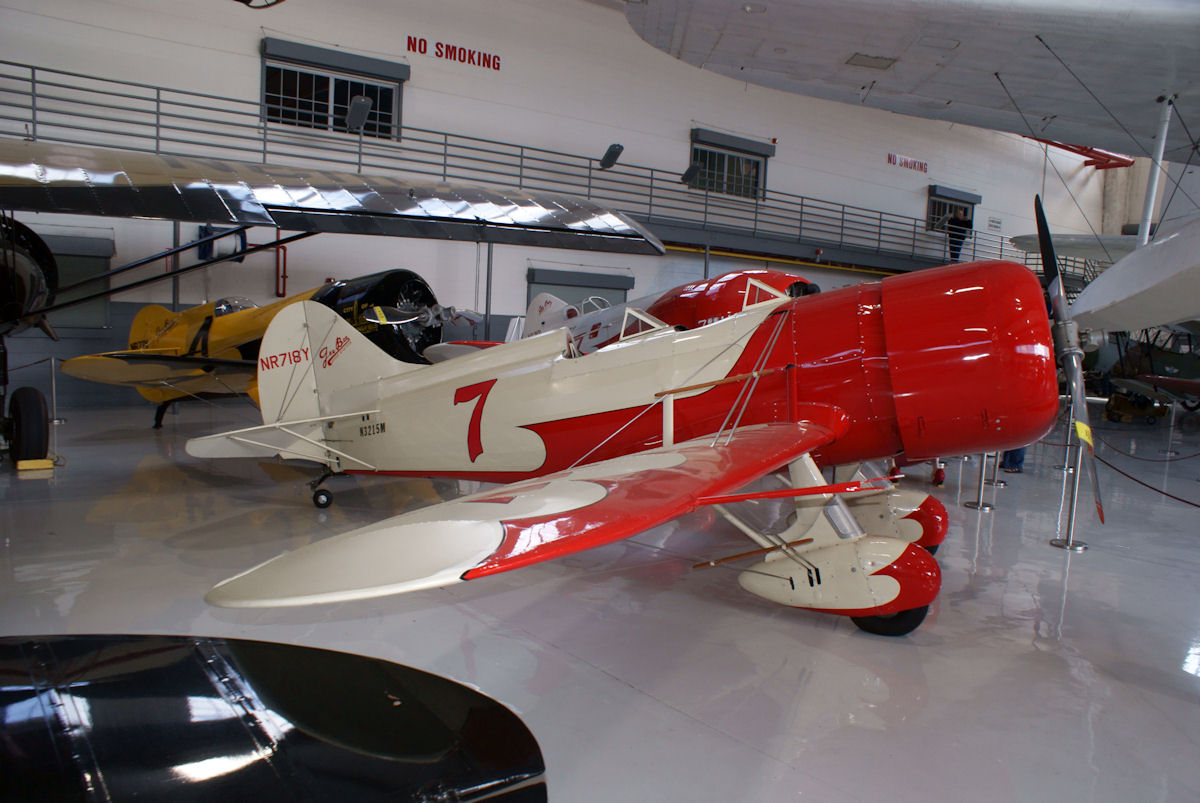

General information
- Type: Sports plane
- National origin: United States of America
- Manufacturer: Granville Brothers
- Designer: Robert Hall
- Number built: 2

History
- First flight: 1931

The Gee Bee Model Y Senior Sportster was a sport aircraft built in the United States in the early 1930s by the Granville Brothers. Essentially an enlarged two-seat version of the single-seat Sportster, it was a low-wing strut-and-wire-braced monoplane of conventional design with open cockpits and fixed tailskid undercarriage. The first of the two examples constructed (registration X 11049) remained with the Granville Brothers company and competed in many races, piloted by Maude Tait and Russell Boardman, among others. Later it also served as a support aircraft for the R-1 and R-2 racers. The second Model Y (registration NR718Y) was built to order for the Cord Auto Company to be used as an engine testbed for the Lycoming R-680 engine they produced. This aircraft was later refitted with a Wright Whirlwind of nearly double the power of its original powerplant. In this form, it was flown by Florence Klingensmith at the 1933 Chicago International Races, where she won second place in the Women's Free-For-All, then perished in the aircraft after fabric became detached from the upper right wing while contesting the Phillips Trophy.

== Specifications ==
General characteristics

- Crew: One pilot
- Capacity: 1 passenger
- Length: 21 ft 0 in (6.40 m)
- Wingspan: 30 ft 0 in (9.14 m)
- Height: 7 ft 5 in (2.25 m)
- Powerplant: 1 × Lycoming R-680 , 215 hp (160 kW)

Performance

- Maximum speed: 160 mph (260 km/h, 140 kn)
