= Lowell Bayles =

American air racer

Lowell Richard Bayles
- Born: January 24, 1900; Mason, Illinois, U.S.
- Died: December 5, 1931 (aged 31); Wayne County Airport, Detroit, Michigan, U.S.
- Cause of death: Airplane crash
- Awards: Thompson Trophy 1931
- Aviation career
- First flight: 1924
- Famous flights: Cirrus Derby; Shell Speed Dash

Lowell Richard Bayles (January 24, 1900 – December 5, 1931) was an American air race and stunt pilot from the "Golden Age of Air Racing." He was the winner of the 1931 Thompson Trophy flying the Gee Bee Model Z. He was killed during an attempt at the landplane speed record when the Model Z he was flying crashed at over 300 miles per hour (483 km/h) mph.

== Early life ==
Bayles was born in Mason, Illinois on January 24, 1900, the oldest child of Hattie and Rayford E. Bayles. He graduated from Newton, Illinois High School and attended the University of Illinois in mining engineering, but was forced to leave due to eye trouble. He was working as an electrician in various mines around Illinois when he began taking flying lessons.

== Flying ==
Bayles began taking flying lessons from a former World War I instructor pilot. He eventually bought a surplus Curtiss JN-4 Jenny The Jenny was lost when he stopped over in Herrin, Illinois during a gang war between Charlie Birger and the Shelton Brothers Gang. Birger had been bombed from the air and he mistook Bayles' plane for the bomber and had the plane dynamited.

After a stint back in the mines, Bayles began barnstorming around the country. In 1928 he partnered with H. Roscoe Brinton starting a flying service in Springfield, Massachusetts.

Due to the Great Depression, orders for aircraft had stopped and the Granville Brothers Aircraft Company saw the air racing circuit as a way to stay in business. To raise seed money for the air racing operation, the "Springfield Air Racing Association" (SARA) was formed. A group of local Springfield merchants and businessmen who sought to promote Springfield bought shares to fund creation of the racing planes. Bayles added $500 of his own money to be the pilot in the venture.

Bayles flew the Gee Bee Model X in the Cirrus Derby in 1930, coming in second and sharing the $7000 purse with the Granvilles.

In 1931, Bayles piloted a Gee Bee Model E Sportster in the Ford National Reliability Air Tour, coming in fourth in the point standing and winning the Great Lakes Trophy for a total of $2000 in prize money.

At the 1931 National Air Races, Bayles and the Gee Bee Model Z, christened the "City of Springfield," cleaned up, first winning the $7500 Thompson Trophy prize with an average speed of 236.239 miles per hour (380 km/h), then the Shell Speed dash with an average of 267.342 miles per hour (430 km/h), breaking the speed record for the course, then won the Goodyear Trophy race with an average of 206 miles per hour (332 km/h).

== Speed record and death ==
Bayles had failed to break the official 3 km World Landplane Speed Record at the 1931 National Air Races. Following the Thompson Trophy race, the Gee Bee Z was re-engined with a larger, 750-horsepower (560 kW) Wasp Senior radial, in preparation for an attempt at establishing another world speed record at Wayne County Airport in Detroit, Michigan.

On December 1, 1931, Lowell Bayles attempted the speed record again and made four passes at an average of 281.75 miles per hour (453 km/h), but did not surpass the old record by the required 4.97 miles per hour (8 km/h).

On December 5, Bayles tried again, diving into the course from 1,000 feet (305 m) and leveling off at 150 feet (46 m) as rules allowed. Travelling over 300 miles per hour (483 km/h), 75 feet (23 m) from the ground, the Model Z suddenly pitched up, the right wing folded beyond the flying wire attachment point, most likely due to aileron flutter stressing the wing spar and causing it to fail. The plane crashed alongside a railroad track in a huge ball of flame and smoke. Lowell Bayles' body was thrown 300 feet (91 m) from the disintegrated plane.

Analysis of the crash, based on motion picture film of the event examined frame-by-frame, showed that the aircraft's fuel cap had come loose and crashed through the Gee Bee Z's windscreen. It struck the pilot and incapacitated him, causing a sudden upset in pitch that led to the structural failure of the wing. In addition, tests of a reproduction aircraft have shown that the Gee Bee Z was susceptible to aerodynamic flutter at high speed.

His fiancée, Gertrude St. Marie of Springfield, traveled to his hometown of Mason, Illinois for his funeral, along with Mrs. Zantford Granville.
