= Boeing 80 =

1920s American airliner

Model 80
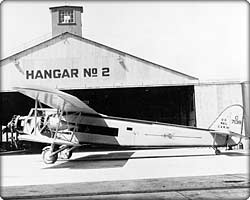

General information
- Type: Airliner
- Manufacturer: Boeing
- Status: Retired
- Primary user: Boeing Air Transport
- Number built: 16

History
- Introduction date: September 20, 1928, with Boeing Air Transport
- First flight: July 27, 1928
- Retired: 1934

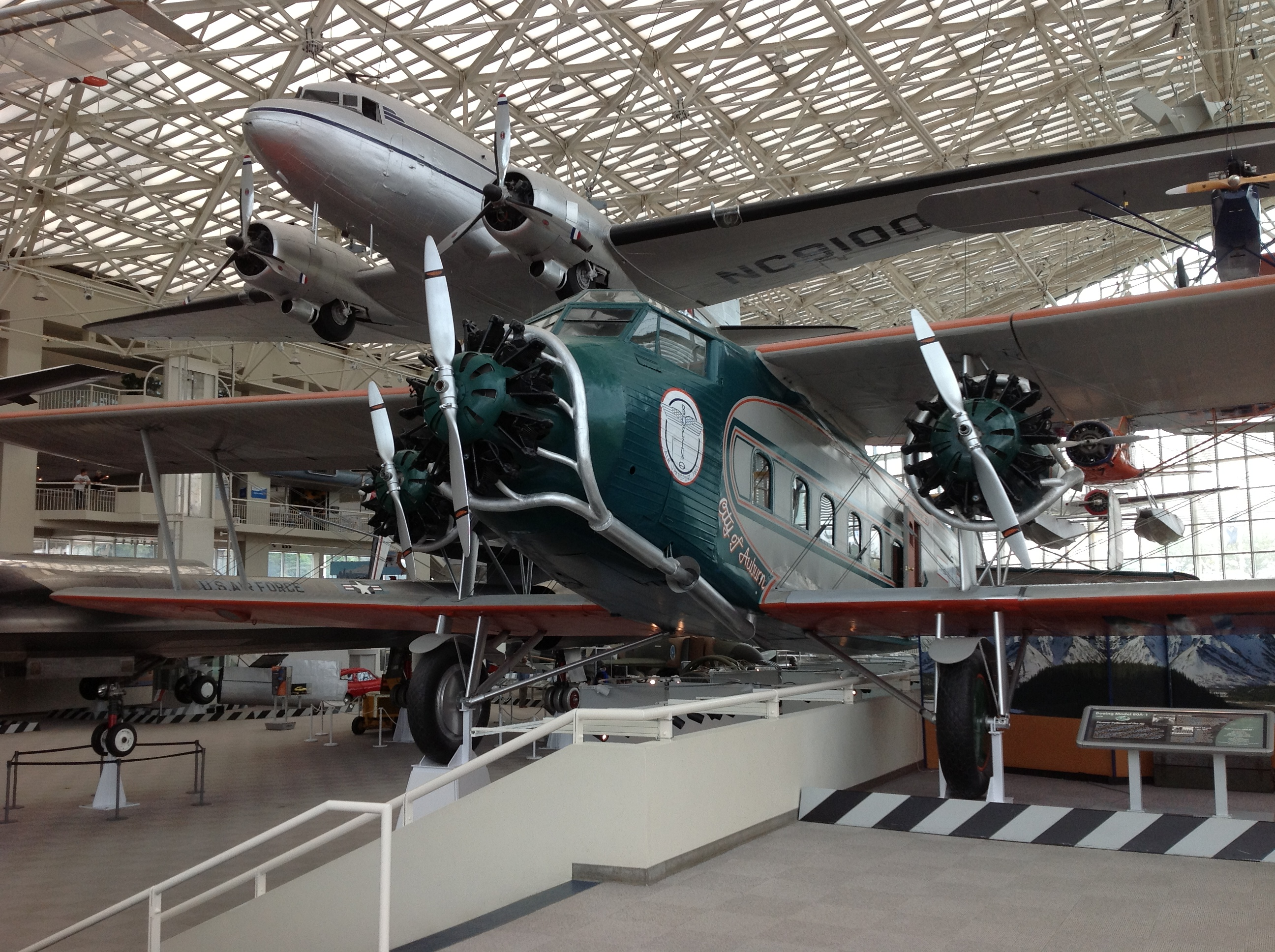
Boeing Model 80A-1 in Museum of Flight in Seattle

The Boeing 80 is an American airliner of the 1920s. A three-engined biplane, the Model 80 was built by the Boeing Airplane Company for Boeing's own airline, Boeing Air Transport, successfully carrying both airmail and passengers on scheduled services.

== Development and design ==
Boeing Air Transport was formed on February 17, 1927, by William Boeing to operate the Contract Air Mail (CAM) service between San Francisco and Chicago (CAM.18), taking over the route on July 1, 1927. The route was initially operated by single-engined Boeing 40A biplanes, which could carry four passengers, which provided a useful supplement to the subsidized revenue from carrying airmail.

In order to take better advantage of passenger traffic, Boeing decided that it needed a larger aircraft that was more suitable for passenger carrying, and in early 1928 designed a trimotor aircraft capable of carrying 12 passengers, the Model 80. Unlike the Fokker F-10 and Ford Trimotors operated by other U.S. airlines, the Model 80 was a biplane, chosen to give good takeoff and landing performance when operating from difficult airfields on its routes, many of which were at relatively high altitude. The fuselage was of fabric covered steel and aluminium tube construction, and carried its 12 passengers in three-abreast seating in a well-appointed cabin. The flight crew of two sat in an enclosed flight deck forward of the passenger cabin. The wings were of fabric covered steel and duralumin construction, with detachable wingtips to aid storage in hangars.

The first Model 80, powered by three Pratt & Whitney Wasp radial engines, flew on July 27, 1928. It was followed by three more Model 80s before production switched to the improved Model 80A, which was longer, allowing 18 passengers to be carried, and was powered by more powerful Pratt & Whitney Hornet engines, first flying on July 18, 1929, and receiving its airworthiness certificate on August 20, 1929.

== Operational history ==
The Model 80 carried out its first scheduled mail and passenger service for Boeing Air Transport on September 20, 1928, and soon proved successful. The improved Model 80A entered service in September 1929.

In May 1930, Boeing Air Transport introduced female flight attendants, hiring eight including chief stewardess Ellen Church; all were unmarried registered nurses. Flights carrying stewardesses began on May 15. The Model 80 and 80A remained in service with Boeing Air Transport (later renamed United Airlines) until replaced by the Boeing 247 twin-engined monoplane in 1934.

== Variants ==
- Model 80 – original production version with Pratt & Whitney Wasp engines (four built)
- Model 80A – improved aerodynamics and Pratt & Whitney Hornet engines (10 built)
  - Model 80A-1 – version with revised empennage with an added finlet on each tailplane; all 10 Model 80As converted to this standard
- Model 80B-1 – single Model 80A built with open flight deck. Later modified to Model 80A-1 standard
- Model 226 – one-off Model 80A converted to executive transport for Standard Oil. Modified tail surfaces later adopted on all Model 80As (see Model 80A-1)

== Operators ==
United States

- Boeing Air Transport
- Monterey Peninsula Airways
- Morrison-Knudsen Company
- National Parks Airways
- Robert Campbell Reeve
- Standard Oil, California
- United Airlines

== Surviving aircraft ==
A single Model 80A-1, modified as a freighter for use in Alaska, was salvaged from a dump at Anchorage Airport in 1960, and following restoration is now on display at the Museum of Flight in Seattle.

== Specifications (Model 80A) ==
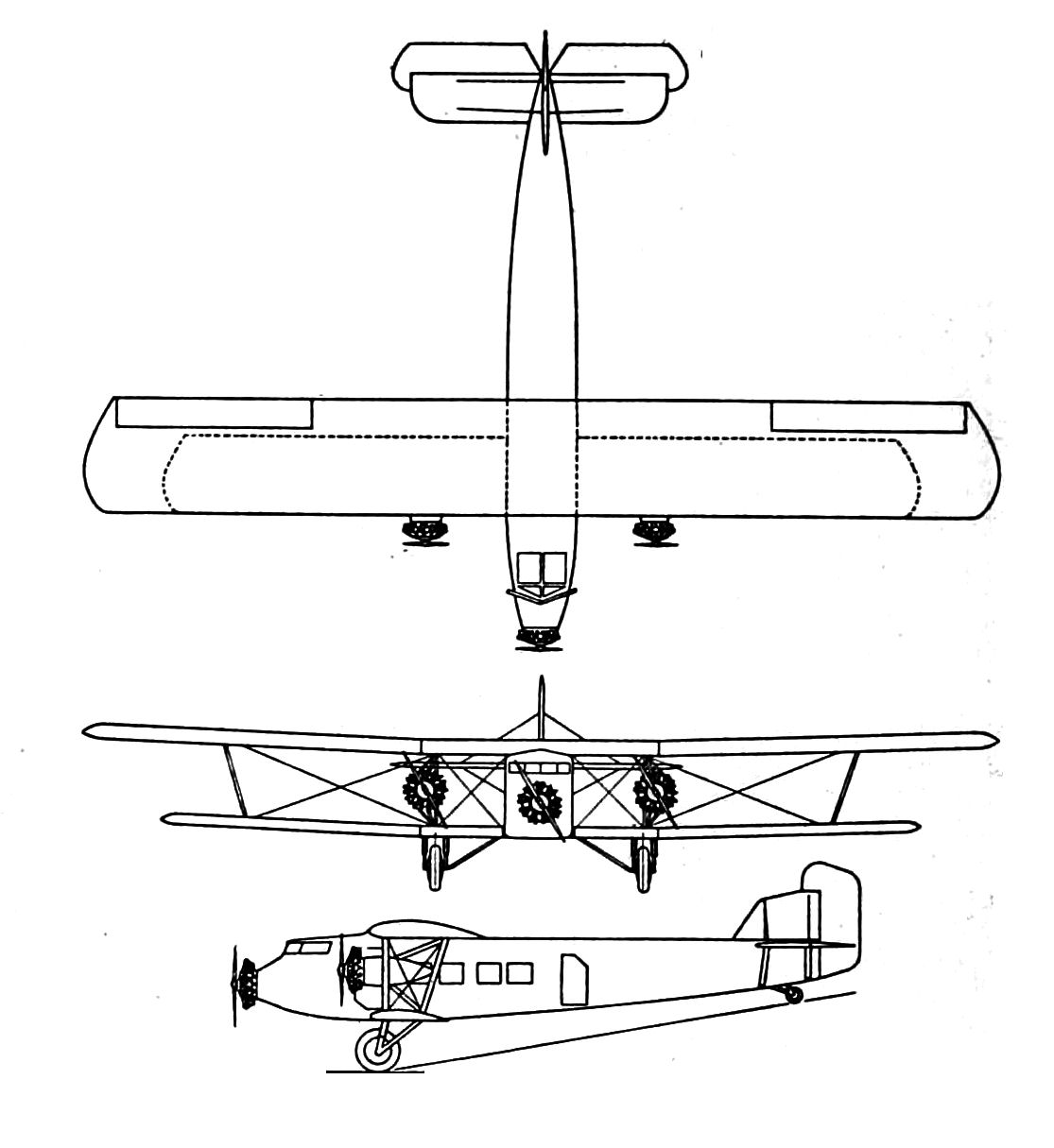
Boeing Model 80 3-view drawing from Aero Digest September 1928

Data from Boeing Aircraft since 1916

General characteristics

- Crew: Three
- Capacity: 18 passengers and 898 lb (408 kg) cargo
- Length: 56 ft 6 in (17.22 m)
- Wingspan: 80 ft 0 in (24.39 m)
- Height: 15 ft 3 in (4.65 m)
- Wing area: 1,220 sq ft (113.4 m^{2})
- Airfoil: Boeing N-22
- Empty weight: 10,582 lb (4,810 kg)
- Max takeoff weight: 17,500 lb (7,940 kg)
- Powerplant: 3 × Pratt & Whitney R-1690 Hornet air-cooled radials, 525 hp (392 kW) each

Performance

- Maximum speed: 138 mph (222 km/h, 120 kn)
- Cruise speed: 125 mph (201 km/h, 109 kn)
- Stall speed: 55 mph (89 km/h, 48 kn)
- Range: 460 mi (741 km, 400 nmi)
- Service ceiling: 14,000 ft (4,270 m)
- Rate of climb: 900 ft/min (4.6 m/s)

== See also ==
Aircraft of comparable role, configuration, and era

- Fokker F.VIII
- Ford Trimotor
- Junkers Ju 52/3m

Related lists

- List of civil aircraft
