= Granville Gee Bee Model Z Super Sportster =

Racing aircraft, United States, 1931

Gee Bee Model Z
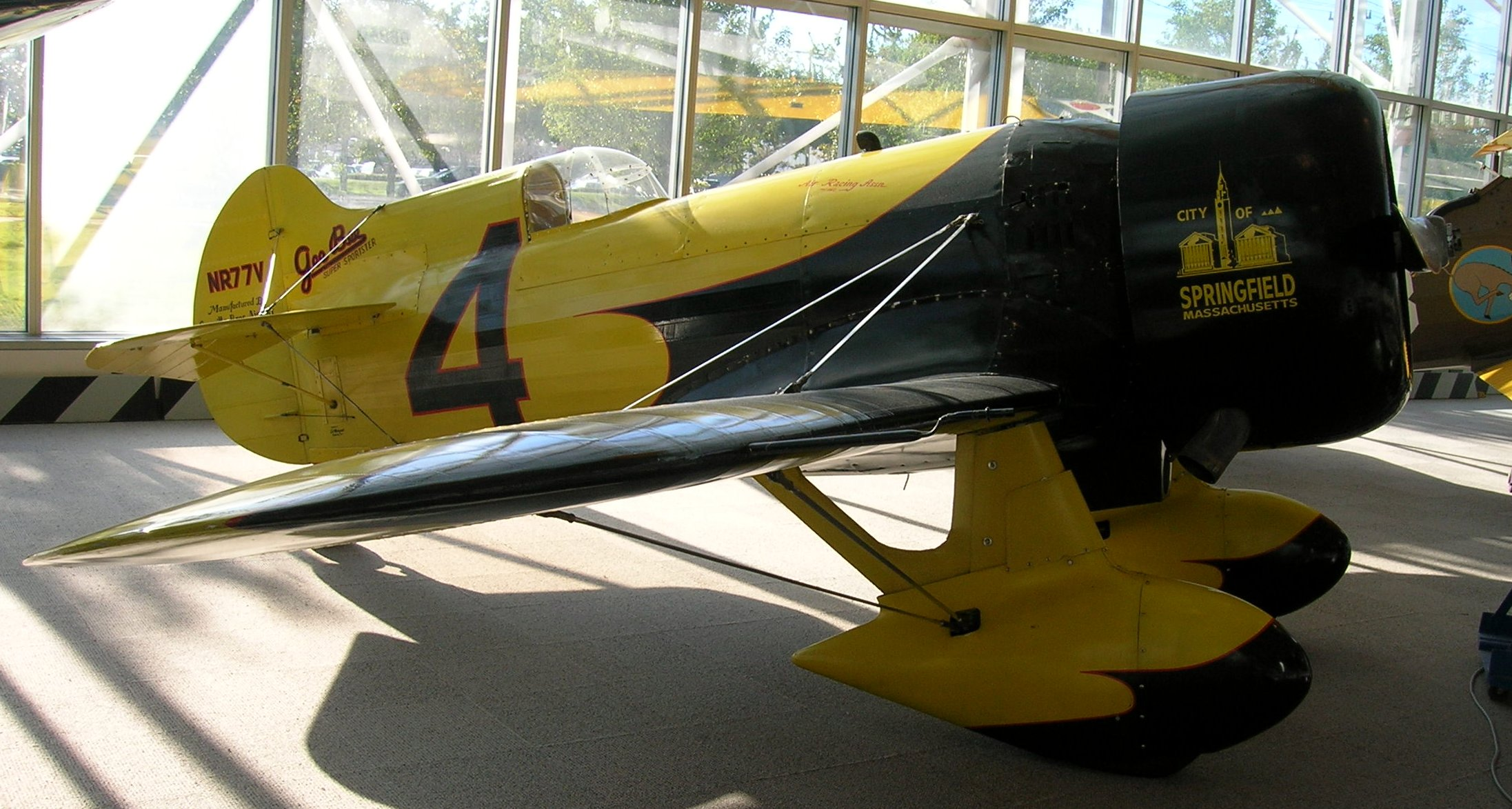
- Replica of the Gee Bee Model Z

General information
- Type: Racing aircraft
- National origin: United States of America
- Manufacturer: Granville Brothers Aircraft
- Designer: Bob Hall
- Number built: 1

History
- Manufactured: 1931
- Introduction date: September 1931
- First flight: August 22, 1931
- Retired: December 5, 1931
- Developed into: Gee Bee Model R

The Granville Gee Bee Model Z was an American racing aircraft that was built, successfully raced, then destroyed in a fatal crash in 1931. It was the first of the Super Sportster aircraft built by Granville Brothers Aircraft of Springfield, Massachusetts, with the sole intent of winning the Thompson Trophy, which it did in September 1931. Its fatal crash that December started the reputation of subsequent Gee Bee aircraft as killers.

== Design and development ==
Suffering from the effects of the Great Depression, the Granville Brothers decided in July 1931 to build an aircraft to compete in that fall's Thompson Trophy competition at the National Air Races in Cleveland, Ohio. They hoped that a victory in the prestigious race would lead to additional orders for their line of sporting aircraft.

Constructed in less than five weeks at a cost of under $5,000 USD, the Gee Bee (for "Granville Brothers") Model Z, named City of Springfield, was a small, tubby airplane. It was essentially the smallest possible airframe constructed around the most powerful available engine of a suitable size, a supercharged Pratt & Whitney Wasp Junior (R-985) radial engine, producing 535 horsepower (399 kW).

== Operational history ==
First flying on August 22, 1931, the Gee Bee Z quickly proved to be tricky to fly, but fulfilled every expectation with regards to its speed. Flown by pilot Lowell Bayles, the Gee Bee Z attained the speed of 267.342 miles per hour (430.245 km/h) at the National Air Races during the Shell Speed Dash qualifying on September 1, then went on to win the Goodyear Trophy race, run over a course of 50 miles (80 km), the next day at an average speed of 205 miles per hour (330 km/h). On September 5, the aircraft's engineer, Bob Hall, flew the Gee Bee Z to victory in the General Tire and Rubber Trophy race, then won again the next day in a free-for-all event.

In the Thompson Trophy Race on September 7, Bayles was triumphant, winning with an average speed of 236.24 miles per hour (380.19 km/h), beating competitors including Jimmy Doolittle, James "Jimmy" Wedell, Ben Howard, Dale Jackson, Bill Ong, Ira Eaker, and Hall, who finished fourth in a Gee Bee Model Y.

Shortly after the Thompson Trophy race, the Gee Bee Z was fitted with a larger, 750-horsepower (560 kW) Wasp R-1340 radial engine for an attempt at establishing a world speed record for land planes. On its trial speed run, the Gee Bee Z was unofficially clocked at 314 miles per hour (505 km/h). On December 1, 1931, the Gee Bee Z was officially clocked at 281.75 miles per hour (453.43 km/h), surpassing the previous record of 278 miles per hour (447 km/h), but the margin was too small for the record to be officially registered. Four days later, on December 5, 1931, a second speed record attempt was made, but the Gee Bee Z's right wing failed catastrophically, causing the air racer to suddenly roll uncontrollably and crash. Bayles was killed instantly.

The exact cause of the Model Z's crash during the December 1931 speed run has not been determined, and frame-by-frame analysis of the filmed crash has been inconclusive. One theory is the fuel tank cap retaining clip failed, then the loose cap hit the windscreen and struck the pilot, incapacitating him. The sudden upset in pitch caused uncontrolled flutter in the right aileron, and the right wing failed from the sudden high-vibration stress. Subsequent tests of reproduction Gee Bees have shown the aircraft was susceptible to aerodynamic flutter at high speeds. The 1932 R-1 and its sister ship, the R-2, were the successors to the previous year's Thompson Trophy-winning Model Z.

=== Legacy ===
Film of the crash of the Gee Bee Z has become some of the most well known footage from the era of air racing. The crash also helped to establish the reputation of Gee Bee racing aircraft as killers. The Super Sportster design was incorporated into the Gee Bee Model R for the 1932 air race season.

Two reproductions of the Gee Bee Z have been constructed. One faithful reproduction of the original aircraft was built by Jeff Eicher and Kevin Kimball of Mount Dora, Florida, and is housed in the Fantasy of Flight museum in Lakeland, Florida. The other reproduction was constructed by Bill Turner in 1978, and features extended wings and fuselage for improved flight characteristics. Turner's reproduction appeared in 1991 as both a static and flying prop in the Disney film The Rocketeer, and is now on display at the Museum of Flight in Tukwila, Washington.

== Specifications (Gee Bee Model Z Super Sportster) ==
Data from

General characteristics

- Crew: 1 (pilot)
- Length: 15 ft 1 in (4.60 m)
- Wingspan: 23 ft 6 in (7.16 m)
- Height: 7 ft (2.1 m)
- Wing area: 75 sq ft (7.0 m^{2})
- Airfoil: M-6
- Empty weight: 1,400 lb (635 kg)
- Gross weight: 2,280 lb (1,034 kg)
- Fuel capacity: 103 US gallons (390 L; 86 imp gal)
- Powerplant: 1 × Pratt & Whitney Wasp Junior radial, 535 hp (399 kW) supercharged
- Propellers: 2-bladed Curtiss Reed fixed pitch, 8 ft 2 in (2.49 m) diameter

Performance

- Maximum speed: 232.314 kn (267.342 mph, 430.245 km/h)
- Cruise speed: 200 kn (230 mph, 370 km/h)
- Range: 780 nmi (900 mi, 1,400 km)

== Popular culture ==
Kermit Weeks, founder of Fantasy of Flight, used a Gee Bee Model Z as his main character "Zee" in a series of children's books set around the interwar period.

A modified, flying replica of the Gee Bee Model Z appeared in several scenes in the 1991 Walt Disney feature film, The Rocketeer.

== See also ==
Related development

- Gee Bee Model R

Aircraft of comparable role, configuration, and era

- Hughes H-1 Racer
