= Springfield Airport (Massachusetts) =

Former airport in Springfield, Massachusetts, US

- IATA: none; ICAO: none

Summary
- Operator: Private
- Location: Springfield, Massachusetts
- Built: Unknown
- In use: Before 1929-Before 1954
- Occupants: Private
- Elevation AMSL: 208 ft / 63 m
- Coordinates: 42°8′16.43″N 72°34′44.37″W
- Interactive map of Springfield Airport

Springfield Airport was an airfield operational during the first half of the 20th century in Springfield, Massachusetts, United States.

== Overview ==
Granville Brothers Aircraft was based at the airfield. The land now features Springfield Plaza, a shopping center.

With the completion of Interstate 91, Bradley International Airport in Windsor Locks, Connecticut serves as a shared-city commercial airport with Hartford. Westover Metropolitan Airport now serves most of the local air travel formerly fulfilled by Springfield Airport.

== See also ==
- Rentschler Field
