= Thompson Trophy =

Airplane race

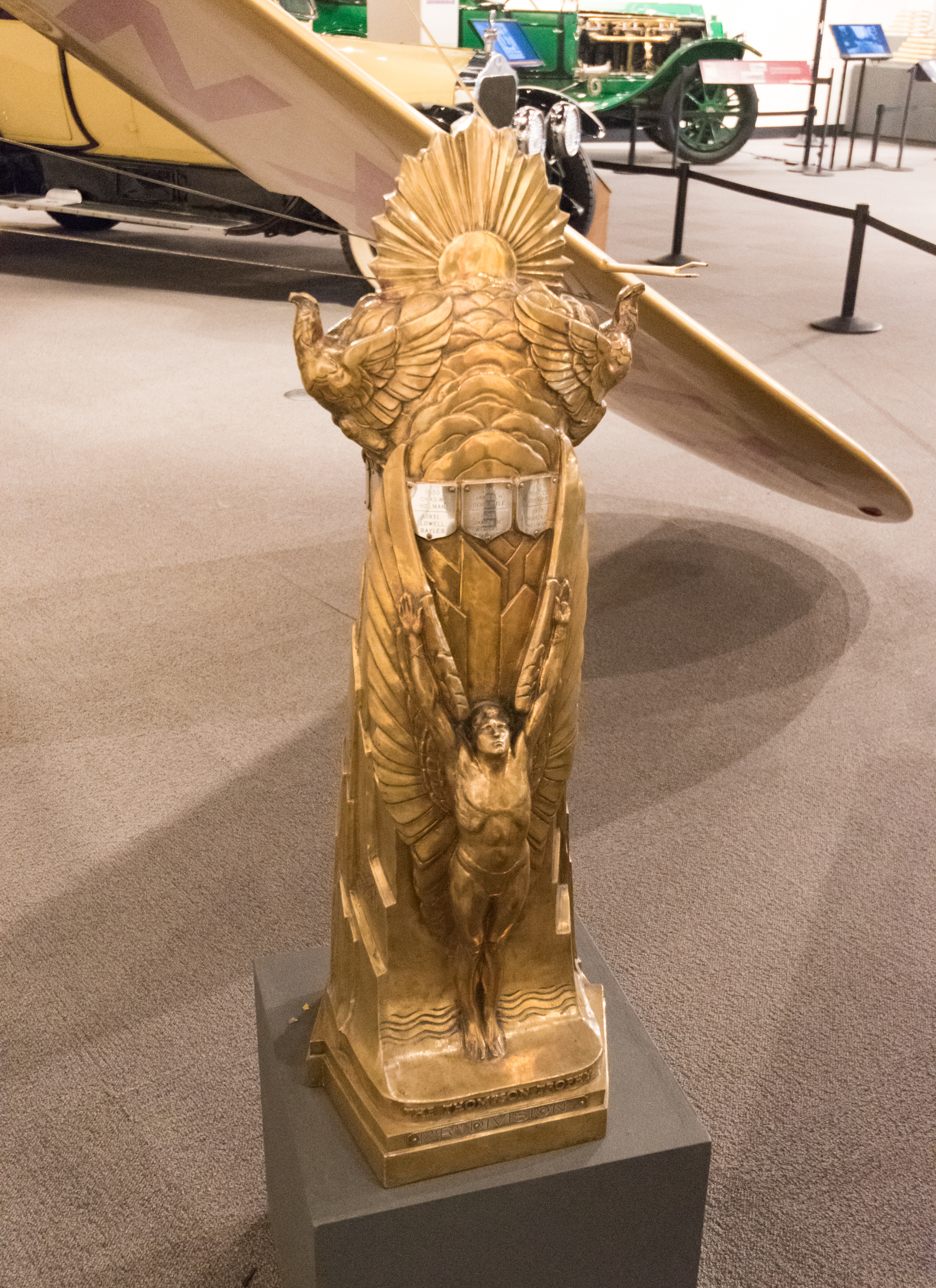
One of the Thompson Trophies, at the Cleveland History Center

The Thompson Trophy race was one of the National Air Races of the heyday of early airplane racing in the 1930s. Established in 1929, the last race was held in 1961. The race was 10 miles (16 km) long with 50-foot-high (15 m) pylons marking the turns, and emphasized low altitude flying and maneuverability at high speeds. As the race was flown around a closed course, crowds in the grandstands could easily see much of the spectacle.

There were two series of Thompson races. The first series followed the award of a "Thompson Cup" in the 1929 National Air Races to the winner of the "International Land Plane Free-For-All" (that is, the unlimited class race). Thompson Products (a predecessor to TRW) decided to sponsor a trophy to be awarded for the next ten years for unlimited class racing (though a stipulation was eventually added excluding women pilots). The trophy was designed by Walter Sinz and is now at Air and Space Museum. Sinz also made a pair of 10-foot-tall (3.0 m) models of the trophy for promotional purposes. Races were held for the next ten years, ending in September 1939. Further races in this series were precluded by the onset of war.

After World War II the original trophy was (according to stipulation) retired. Also, advances in airplane technology, especially the advent of the turbojet, complicated matters. It was decided to establish a new series, with "R" (reciprocating piston engine) and "J" (jet engine) divisions. The "R" class was for civilian competition; the "J" division was for military pilots and was administered by the United States Air Force. Roscoe Turner, the last winner of the pre-war trophy, refused to relinquish it, but the original molds were located, and two additional casts were made, differing only in the legend engraved at the base and by placards identifying the division. Division "R" races were held from 1946 to 1949; Division "J" races (also known as "Military Speed Dashes") were held from 1951 to 1961, except 1952 and 1960.

== Winners ==
Year	Location	Pilot	Plane	Speed mph	Speed km/h	Prize
1929	Cleveland	Doug Davis	Travel Air Type R Mystery Ship	194.5	313	
1930	Chicago	Charles W. Holman	Laird LC-DW300 Solution	201.91	325	
1931	Cleveland	Lowell Bayles	Granville Gee Bee Model Z Super Sportster (replica)	236.239	380	$7,500.00
1932	Cleveland	Jimmy Doolittle	Granville Gee Bee Model R-1 Super Sportster (replica)	252.686	407	$4,500.00
1933	Los Angeles	James R. Wedell	Wedell-Williams Model 44 (replica)	237.952	383	$3,375.00
1934	Cleveland	Roscoe Turner	Wedell-Williams Model 44 (replica)	248.129	399	$4,500.00
1935	Cleveland	Harold Neumann	Howard DGA-6 "Mr. Mulligan" " (replica)	220.194	354	$ 6,750.00
1936	Los Angeles	Michel Detroyat	Caudron C.460 (replica)	264.261	425	$ 9,500.00
1937	Cleveland	R. A. "Rudy" Kling	Folkerts SK-3	256.910	413	$9,000.00
1938	Cleveland	Roscoe Turner	Laird-Turner Meteor LTR-14	283.419	456	$22,000.00
1939	Cleveland	Roscoe Turner	Laird-Turner Meteor LTR-14	282.536	455	$16,000.00
1940	No races during this period due to World War II					
1941	No races during this period due to World War II					
1942	No races during this period due to World War II					
1943	No races during this period due to World War II					
1944	No races during this period due to World War II					
1945	No races during this period due to World War II					
1946	Cleveland	Alvin "Tex" Johnston	Bell P-39Q Airacobra (type example)	373	600	?
1947	Cleveland	Cook Cleland	Goodyear F2G Corsair	396	637	?
1948	Cleveland	Anson Johnson	North American P-51D	396	637	?
1949	Cleveland	Cook Cleland	Goodyear F2G Corsair	397	639	?
1951	Detroit	Colonel Ascani	North American F-86E Sabre (type example)	635	1,022	?
1953	Dayton	Brig. General Holtoner	North American F-86D Sabre (type example)	690	1,110	?
1954	Dayton	Captain Sonnenberg	North American F-86H Sabre (type example)	692	1,114	?
1955	Edwards Air Force Base	Colonel Hanes	North American F-100C Super Sabre (type example)	822	1,323	?
1956	NAS China Lake	Commander Windsor	Vought F8U-1 Crusader	1,015	1,633	?
1957	Edwards Air Force Base	Major Drew	McDonnell F-101A Voodoo (type example)	1,207	1,942	?
1958	Edwards Air Force Base	Captain Irwin	Lockheed F-104A Starfighter (type example)	1,404	2,260	?
1959	Edwards Air Force Base	Major Rogers	Convair F-106A Delta Dart (type example)	1,525	2,454	?
1961	Edwards Air Force Base	Major Harold E. Confer	Convair B-58A Hustler (type example)	1,302	2,095	?

== See also ==
- List of aviation awards
