= Pratt & Whitney R-1690 Hornet =

9-cylinder radial engine family

R-1690 Hornet
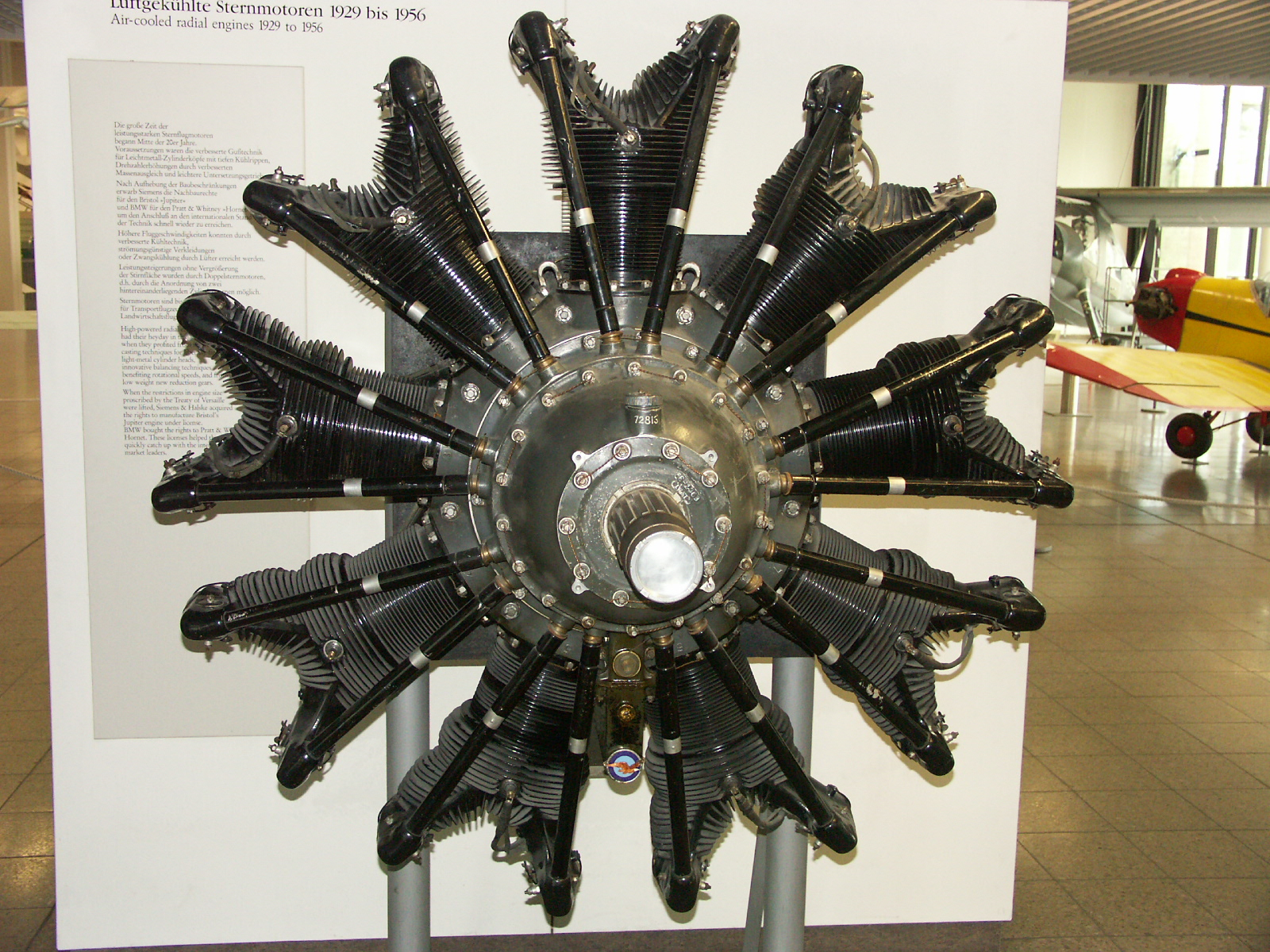
- Pratt & Whitney Hornet, at the Deutsches Museum, Munich.
- Type: Radial engine
- National origin: United States
- Manufacturer: Pratt & Whitney
- First run: June 1926
- Major applications: Boeing 80; Lockheed Lodestar; Sikorsky S-42; Vought O2U Corsair
- Number built: 2,944
- Developed into: Pratt & Whitney R-1860; BMW 132; Mitsubishi Kinsei

The Pratt & Whitney R-1690 Hornet was a widely used American aircraft engine. Developed by Pratt & Whitney, 2,944 were produced from 1926 through 1942. It first flew in 1927. It was a single-row, 9-cylinder air-cooled radial design. Displacement was 1,690 cubic inches (27.7 L). It was built under license in Italy as the Fiat A.59. In Germany, the BMW 132 was a developed version of this engine. The R-1860 Hornet B was an enlarged version produced from 1929.

== Variants ==
R-1690-3
525 hp (391 kW)
R-1690-5
525 hp (391 kW)
R-1690-11
775 hp (578 kW)
R-1690-13
625 hp (466 kW)
R-1690-S5D1G
700 hp (520 kW)
R-1690-52
750 hp (560 kW)
R-1690-SDG
R-1690-S1EG
750 hp (560 kW)
R-1690-S2EG
R-1690-25
850 hp (630 kW)
R-1690-S1C3G
1,050 hp (780 kW)
Fiat A.59 R.
License built in Italy with reduction gearing.
Fiat A.59 R.C.
License built in Italy with reduction gearing and supercharger.
BMW Hornet
License production of the Hornet in Germany, independently developed as the BMW 132.

== Applications ==
- Bach Air Yacht
- Bellanca 31-40
- Boeing 80
- Boeing Model 95
- Boeing Model 299
- Burnelli UB-14
- Douglas O-38
- Focke-Wulf Fw 200 V1
- Gee Bee Model R-2 (1933)
- Gee Bee R 1/2 Super Sportster
- Granville-Miller-de Lackner R-6H "Q.E.D."
- Junkers Ju 52
- Junkers Ju 86
- Junkers W 34
- Keystone B-3
- Lockheed Model 14 Super Electra (L-14H)
- Lockheed Lodestar (C-56A, C-56B, C-56C, C-56D, C-56E, C-59/Mk 1a)
- Martin BM
- Martin XB-14
- Vought O2U Corsair
- Sikorsky S-40A
- Sikorsky S-42
- Sikorsky S-43
- Wedell-Williams Model 44

== Engines on display ==
- There is a R-1690 on display at the New England Air Museum, Bradley International Airport, Windsor Locks, CT.

== Specifications (R-1690 S1E-G) ==
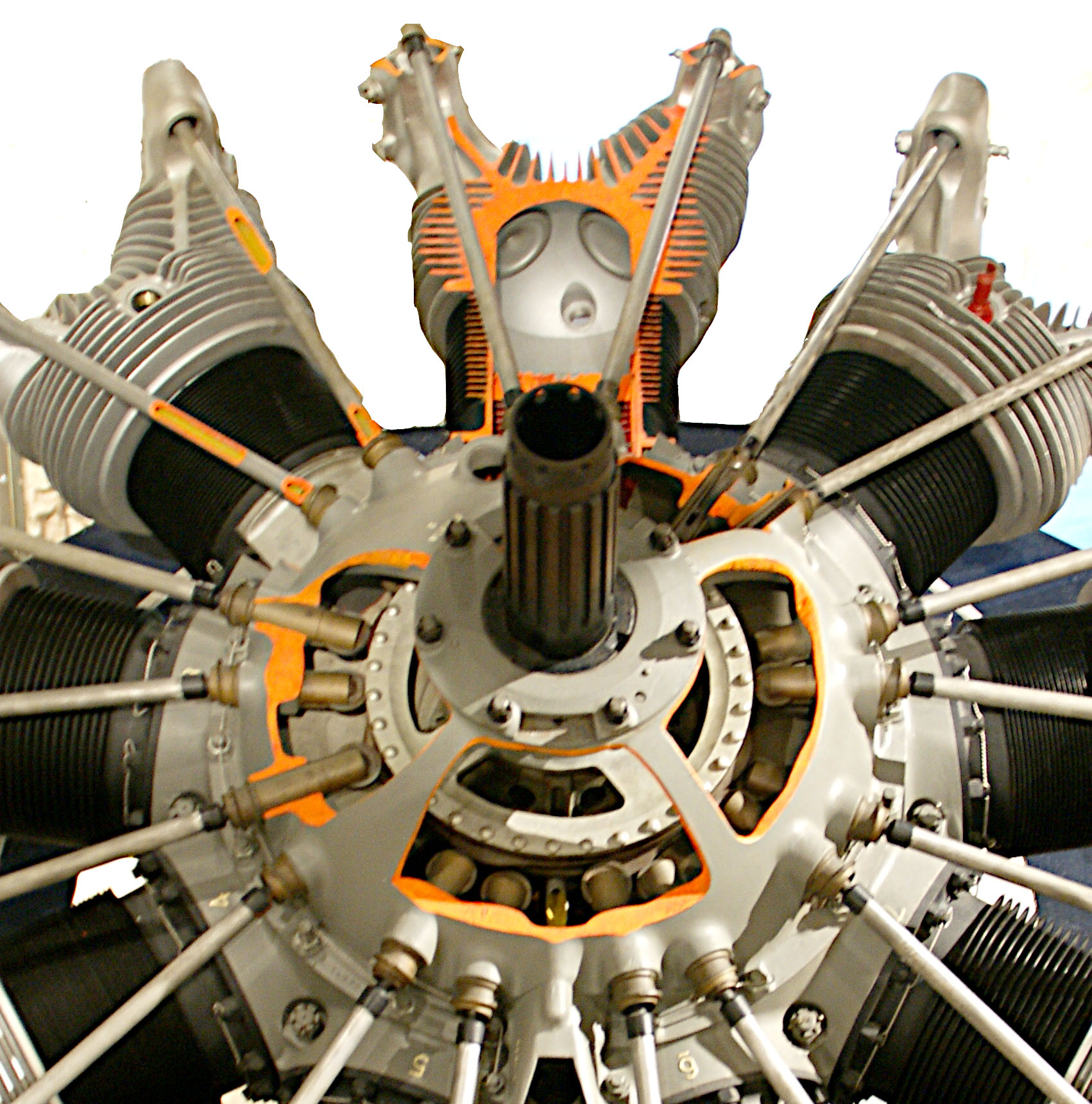
R-1690 with chamber walls cut away to show internal workings

Data from

=== General characteristics ===
- Type: Nine-cylinder single-row supercharged air-cooled radial engine
- Bore: 6 1/8 in (155.6 mm)
- Stroke: 6 3/8 in (161.9 mm)
- Displacement: 1,690.5 cu in (27.7 L)
- Length: 50.98 in (1,295 mm)
- Diameter: 54.41 in (1,382 mm)
- Dry weight: 1,014 lb (460 kg)

=== Components ===
- Valvetrain: Pushrod-actuated
- Supercharger: Single-speed centrifugal type supercharger, 12.0:1 gear ratio
- Fuel system: Two-barrel Stromberg carburetor
- Fuel type: 87 octane rating gasoline
- Cooling system: Air-cooled
- Reduction gear: Epicyclic gearing, 2:3

=== Performance ===
- Power output:
- 789 hp (588 kW) at 2,300 rpm for takeoff
- 740 hp (550 kW) at 2,250 rpm at 7,000 ft (2,100 m)
- Specific power: 0.47 hp/cu in (21.39 kW/L)
- Compression ratio: 6.0:1
- Specific fuel consumption: 0.6 lb/(hp•h) (362 g/(kW•h))
- Oil consumption: 0.42 oz/(hp•h) (16 g/(kW•h))
- Power-to-weight ratio: 0.78 hp/lb (1.28 kW/kg)

== See also ==
Related development

- BMW 132
- Mitsubishi Kinsei
- Pratt & Whitney R-1860 Hornet B
- Pratt & Whitney R-2180-A Twin Hornet

Comparable engines

- Bristol Pegasus
- Wright R-1750

Related lists

- List of aircraft engines
