= Granville Gee Bee Model R Super Sportster =

American 1930s monoplane racer

Gee Bee Model R
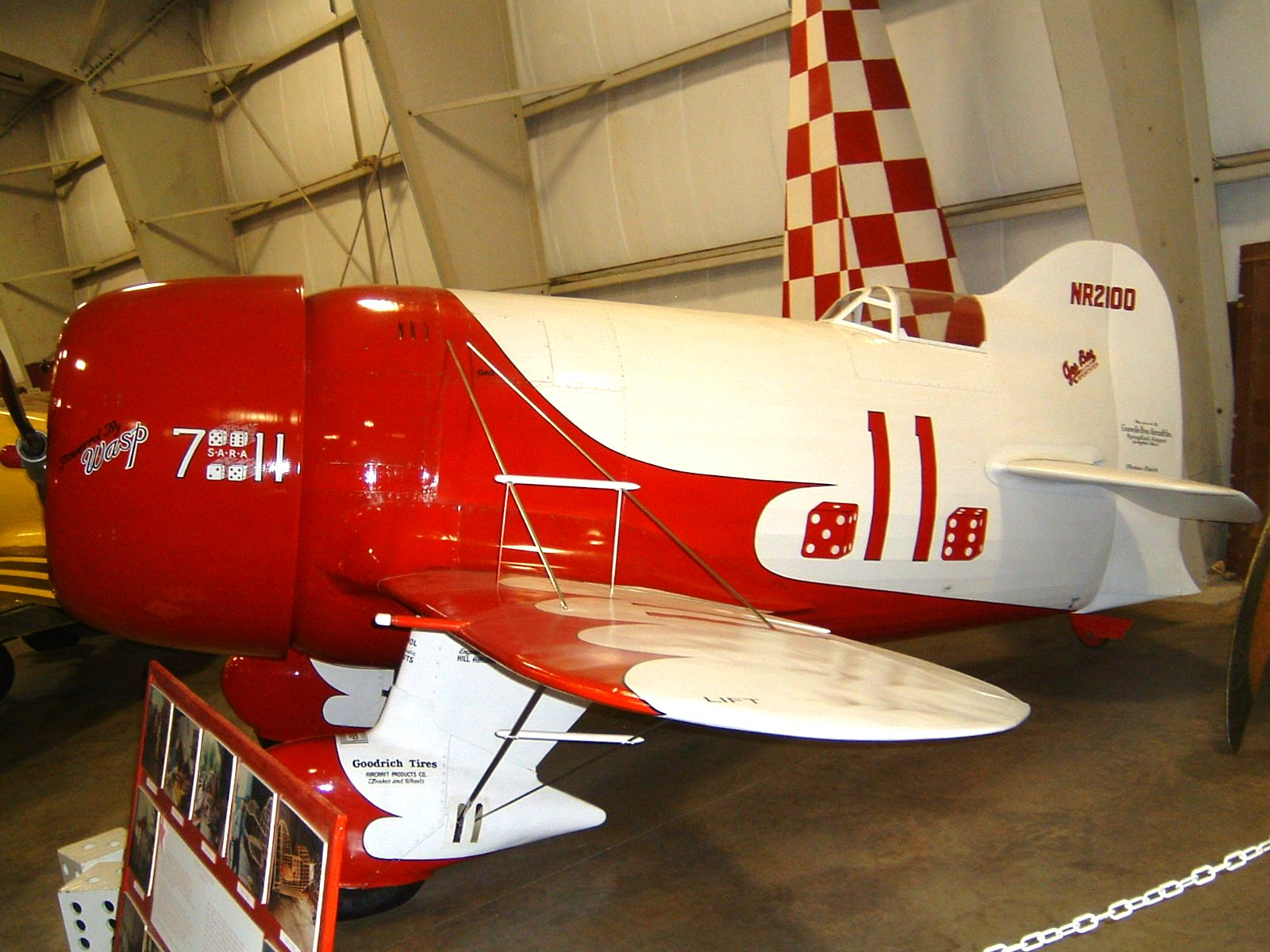
- Reproduction of the Gee Bee R-1 at the New England Air Museum.

General information
- Type: Air racing
- National origin: United States
- Manufacturer: Granville Brothers Aircraft
- Designer: Howell W. "Pete" Miller, Zantford Granville

History
- Manufactured: 1932-1933
- Introduction date: 1932
- First flight: 13 August 1932
- Developed from: Gee Bee Model Z

The Gee Bee Model R Super Sportster was a special-purpose racing aircraft made by Granville Brothers Aircraft of Springfield, Massachusetts, at the since-abandoned Springfield Airport. Gee Bee stands for Granville Brothers.

== Design and development ==
The 1932 R-1 and its sister aircraft, the R-2, were the successors of the previous year's Thompson Trophy-winning Model Z.

Assistant Chief Engineer Howell "Pete" Miller and Zantford "Granny" Granville spent three days of wind tunnel testing at NYU with aeronautical engineering professor Alexander Klemin. Granville reasoned that a teardrop-shaped fuselage would have lower drag than a straight-tapered one, so the fuselage was wider than the engine at its widest point (at the wing attachment point[s], within the length of the wing chord). The cockpit was located very far aft, just in front of the vertical stabilizer, in order to give the racing pilot better vision while making crowded pylon turns.

== Operational history ==
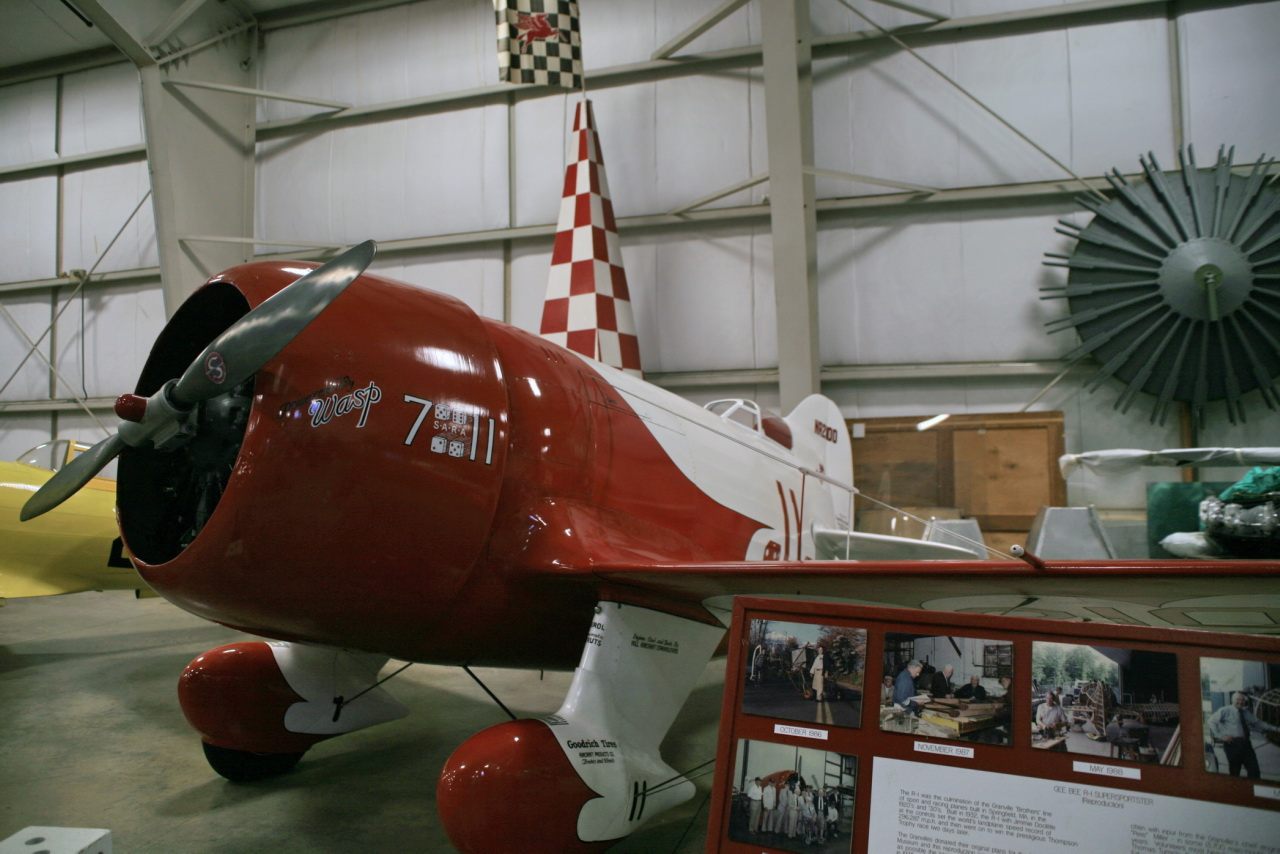
Reproduction of the Thompson Trophy Race-winning R-1

The R-1, piloted by Jimmy Doolittle, won the 1932 Thompson Trophy race. He lapped all but one of the competing aircraft, made easy turns and never had to come down and make a tight pylon turn. He also set a new F.A.I. world landplane speed record of 294.418 mph (473.820 km/h) in the Shell Speed Dash.

The Springfield Union newspaper of September 6, 1932 quoted Doolittle as saying, "She is the sweetest ship I've ever flown. She is perfect in every respect and the motor is just as good as it was a week ago. It never missed a beat and has lots of stuff in it yet. I think this proves that the Granville brothers up in Springfield build the very best speed ships in America today." Another Springfield paper of the same date quoted Doolittle as saying, "The ship performed admirably. She was so fast that there was no need of my taking sharp turns although if the competition had been stiffer I would have. I just hope Russell Boardman can take her out soon and bring her in for a new record. There were lots of things we might have adjusted more properly if we had had time to run tests with the ship, and they would have meant more speed. I am sure Russell Boardman can take her around at quite a bit more than 300 miles an hour so you see my record may not last long after all."

He also personally wrote Zantford "Grannie" Granville a letter dated September 7, 1932, on Shell Petroleum stationery and addressed to Granville Brothers Aircraft, which reads as follows:

Dear Grannie:

Just a note to tell you that the big G. B. functioned perfectly in both the Thompson Trophy and the Shell Speed Dash.

With sincere best wishes for your continued success, I am as ever.

Jim

Privately, however, Doolittle was more concerned than he let on about the Super Sportster’s stability. “I could tell from the first moment that it was a touchy and probably unpredictable airplane. ... I didn’t trust this little monster. It was fast, but flying it was like balancing a pencil or an ice cream cone on the tip of your finger. You couldn’t let your hand off the stick for an instant, and I didn’t know how much angle of bank would be safe when making pylon turns.”

The R-1 rapidly acquired a reputation as a dangerous aircraft. This shortcoming was common to most racing machines of any kind. During the 1933 Bendix Trophy race, racing pilot Russell Boardman was killed, flying Number 11. During takeoff from a refueling stop in Indianapolis, Indiana, Boardman pulled up too soon, stalled the R-1 and crashed.

The R-1 was repaired but with an 18 in (460 mm) fuselage extension, creating the "Long Tail Racer". It was painted with "I.F." on the cowl (standing for "intestinal fortitude") and the same cartoon "Filaloola Bird" was painted on the side of the fuselage as it was on their successful Model YW. It was decided to save time by not repairing the R-1 wings, but to use the original wings from the R-2, which had been removed in February 1933 when new wings with flaps were built and installed. The R-1/2, or "Longtail" aircraft carried race number 11 because the R-2's original wings were already painted as Number 11 and the repaired fuselage had to be painted regardless. This aircraft crashed in a landing overrun incident soon after it was built, but Roy Minor, the pilot, was not severely injured. The damage was not severe but there was no money left for repairs.

The unrepaired Long Tail Racer was sold to Cecil Allen before the sheriff's bankruptcy auction ended the Granville Brothers company. Allen renamed the ship Spirit of Right, built an entirely new wing with a different airfoil and added a new rear fuel tank for the long distance Bendix race. Former Granville Bros. chief engineer "Pete" Miller wrote to Allen warning him never to put fuel in the rear tank as it would move the center of gravity too far to the rear and make the aircraft too tail heavy to be flown.

It is unlikely that Allen ever attempted a fully fueled takeoff before the start of the race. In 1935 he started the 2,043 mi (3,288 km) Burbank to Cleveland Bendix Trophy race with all tanks full, wallowed off into the morning fog, crashed in a field just beyond the runway and was killed instantly. In spite of all the fuel, there was no fire. After this final crash, the aircraft was never rebuilt.

== Replicas ==
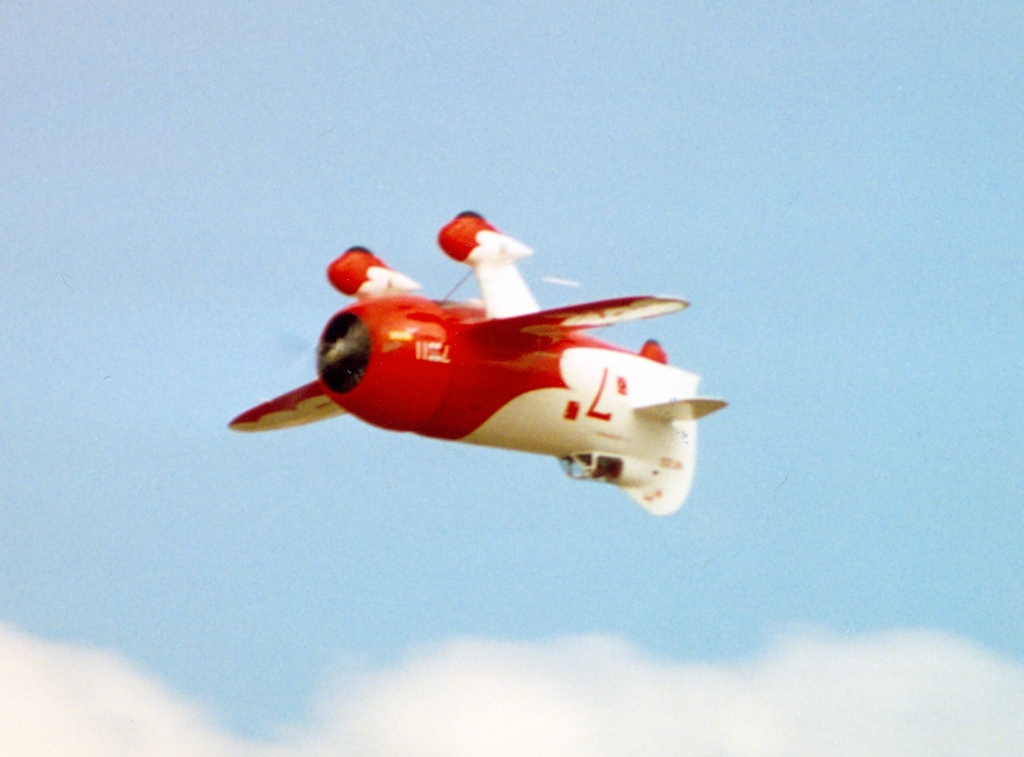
Gee Bee R2 replica flown by Delmar Benjamin at Oshkosh 2001

Non-flying replicas of the R-1 have been built at the New England Air Museum and the San Diego Air & Space Museum using original plans for the aircraft. Another is displayed at the Lyman and Merrie Wood Museum of Springfield History at the Springfield Museums. A flying replica of the R-2 was built by Steve Wolf and Delmar Benjamin that first flew in 1991. Benjamin flew an aerobatic routine in this aircraft at numerous airshows until he retired the aircraft in 2002. This aircraft was sold to Fantasy of Flight in 2004 and is on display in OrLampa, Florida.

== Specifications (Gee Bee Super Sportster R-1) ==
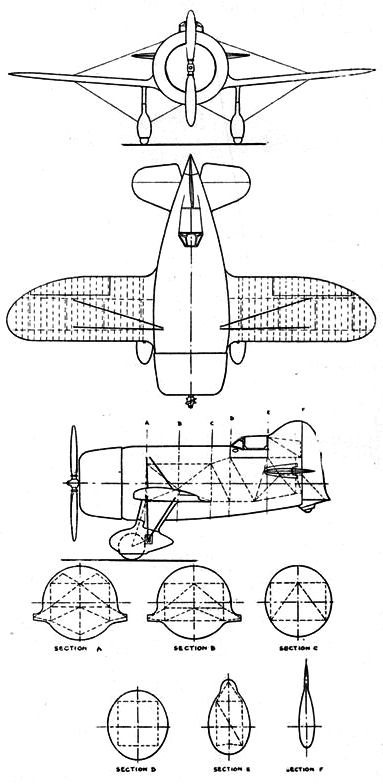
Gee Bee Super Sportster 3-view drawing from L'Aerophile Salon 1932

Data from The Influence of Racing Types on Commercial Aircraft Design.

General characteristics

- Crew: 1
- Length: 17 ft 8 in (5.38 m)
- Wingspan: 25 ft 0 in (7.62 m)
- Height: 8 ft 2 in (2.48 m)
- Wing area: 75 sq ft (6.97 m^{2})
- Airfoil: NACA M6 (modified)
- Empty weight: 1,840 lb (834 kg)
- Gross weight: 2,415 lb (1,095 kg)
- Max takeoff weight: 3,075 lb (1,394.8 kg)
- Fuel capacity: 160 US gal (610 L)
- Aspect ratio: 6.1
- Incidence: 2.5 Degrees
- Powerplant: 1 × Pratt & Whitney R-1340 Wasp 1,344 cubic inch (22 L) displacement air-cooled 9 cylinder radial, 800 hp (596.5 kW)

Performance

- Maximum speed: 294.38 mph (473.8 km/h, 255.81 kn)
- Cruise speed: 260 mph (418.4 km/h, 230 kn)
- Stall speed: 90 mph (144 km/h, 78 kn)
- Range: 925 mi (1,488 km, 804 nmi) 630 miles, full throttle
- full throttle: 2.14 hours
- cruising: 3.65 hours

The 1932 R-2 was identical to the 1932 R-1 except that it used a smaller 550 hp (410 kW) Pratt & Whitney Wasp Junior (R-985) nine cylinder radial powerplant, with a narrower engine cowling, as the aircraft was intended primarily as a cross-country racer with a larger fuel capacity of 302 US gal (1,140 L; 251 imp gal) to increase the distance between fuel stops. The gross weight of the R-2 with full tanks was 3,883 lb (1,761 kg). In 1933, the R-2 was modified with the more powerful Pratt & Whitney Wasp and its cowling from the 1932 R-1 which was uprated in 1933 with the bigger, more powerful Pratt & Whitney R-1690 Hornet. Other 1933 R-2 modifications included a new thicker wing with a longer span of 27.8 ft (8.5 m) and an area of 104 sq ft (9.7 m^{2}), and Granville's 2-piece, double hinged flaps to aid in getting in and out of very short runways with a full fuel load. The landing speed of the R-2 was cut from 100 to 65 mph (161 to 105 km/h). Both racers also got an aluminum extension to their rudder.
