= Granville Brothers Aircraft =

American aircraft manufacturer

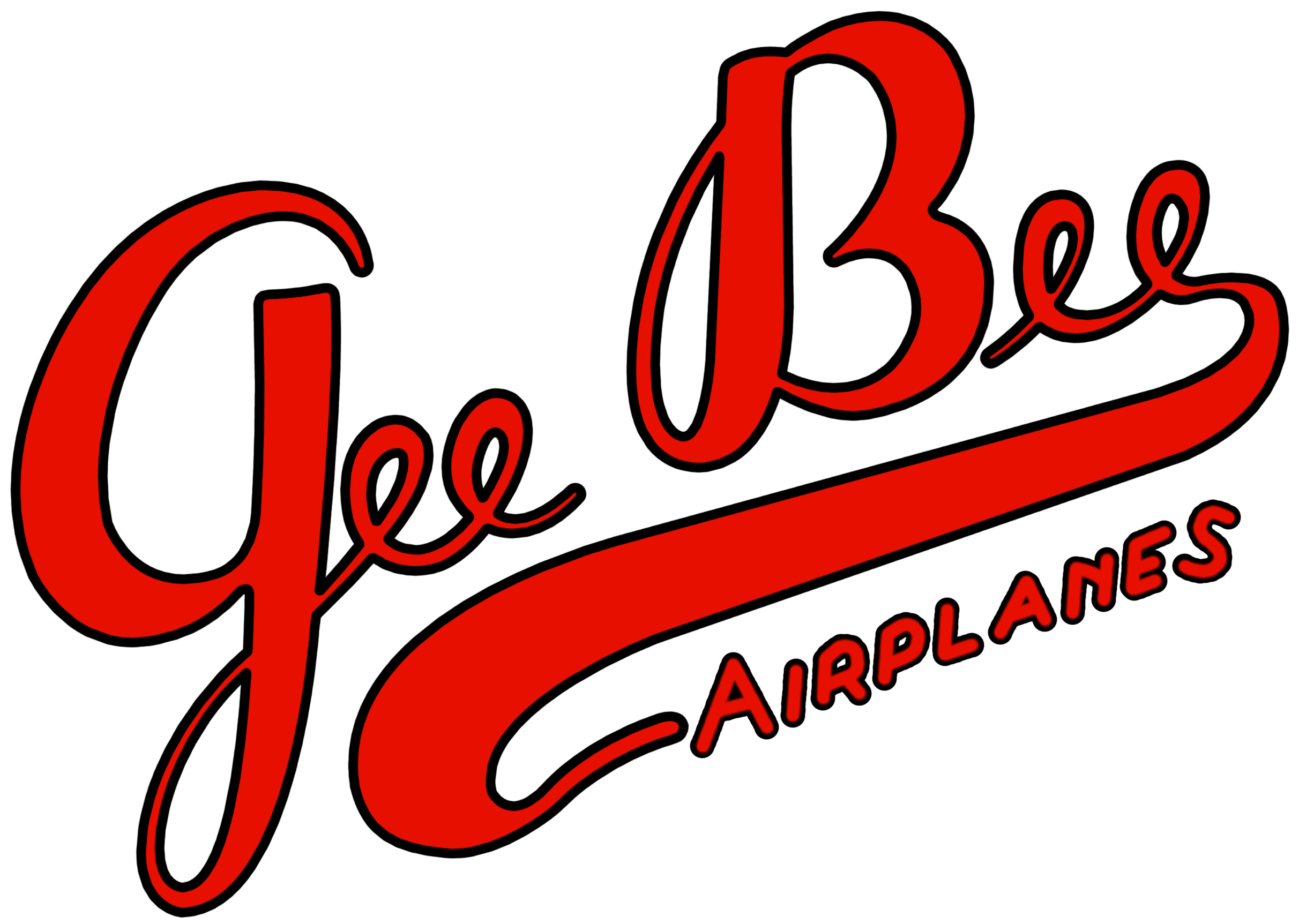
- Type: Aircraft Manufacturer
- Industry: Aviation
- Founded: 1929
- Defunct: 1934
- Fate: Bankrupt
- Successor: Granville, Miller & De Lackner
- Headquarters: Springfield, Massachusetts
- Key people: Zantford, Thomas, Robert, Mark, and Edward Granville
- Products: Aircraft
- Number of employees: 12

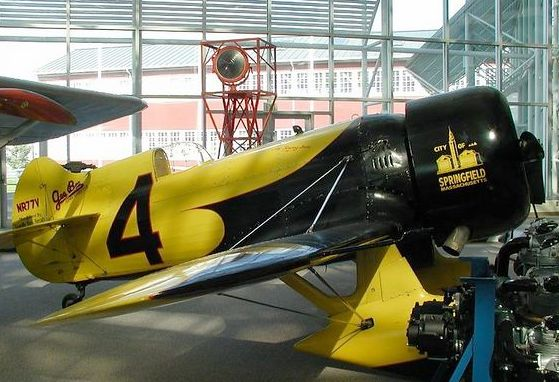
Airworthy reproduction of the Gee Bee Model Z "City of Springfield" at the Museum of Flight in Seattle

Granville Brothers Aircraft was an aircraft manufacturer from 1929 until its bankruptcy in 1934 that was located at the Springfield Airport in Springfield, Massachusetts. The Granville Brothers (Zantford, Thomas, Robert, Mark, Edward) are best known for the three Gee Bee Super Sportster racers, the Models Z and R-1/-2. Prior to building aircraft, Zantford ran a mobile aircraft repair service.

== Aircraft ==
Data from:Aerofiles The Granville Brothers completed 25 aircraft of which only two original aircraft are known to still exist.

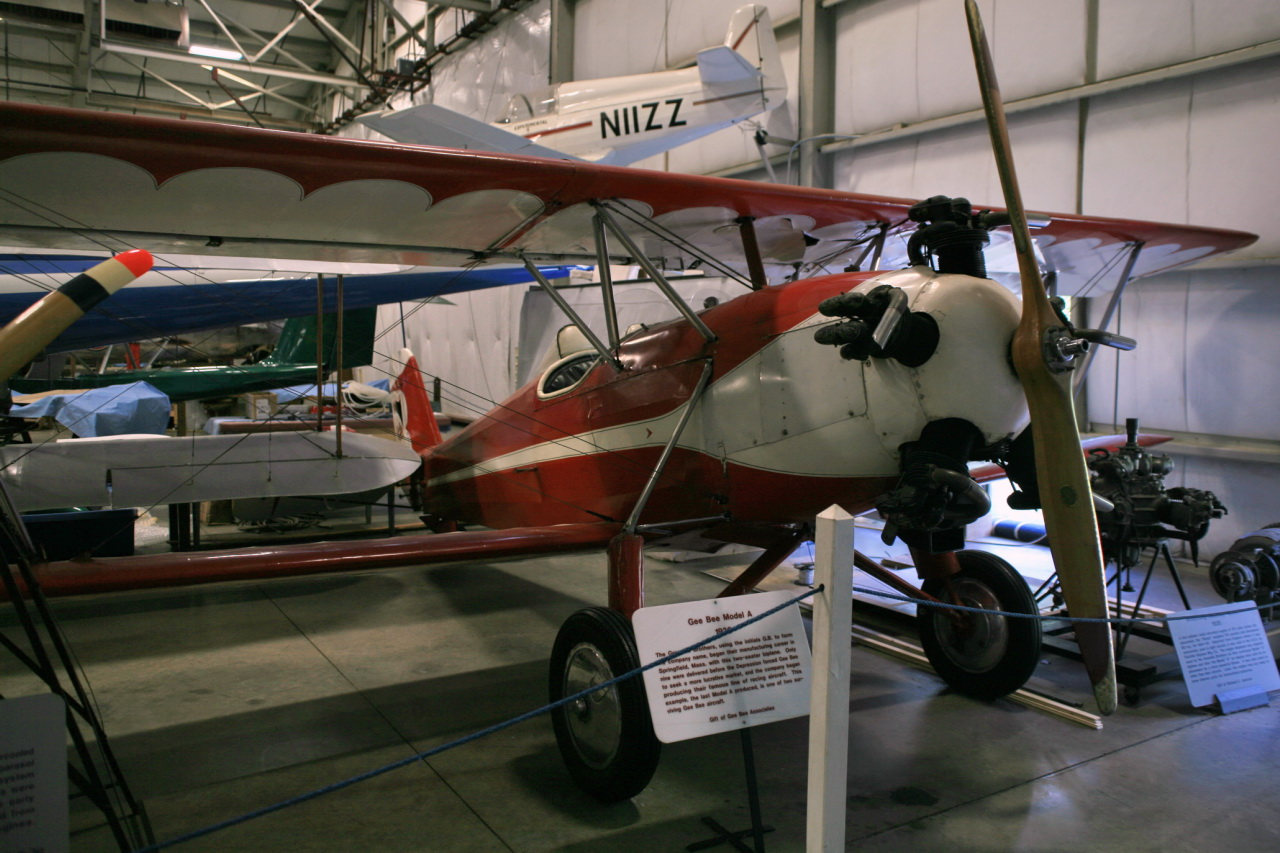
Granville Brothers Model A

Model name	Engine	Date	No.	Notes
Model A (biplane)	various	1929	9	Survivor at New England Air Museum
Model X Sportster	95 hp ADC Cirrus inline	1930	1	Entered the 5,000 mile Cirrus Derby, finished 2nd overall, later converted to Model F with 135 hp Fairchild 6-390 engine
Model B Sportster	95 hp Cirrus Hi-Drive inline	1930	1	rumored to have been sent to Spain for Spanish Civil War
Model C Sportster	95 hp Menasco B-4 inline	1930	1	
Model D Sportster	125 hp Menasco C-4 inline	1931	1	
Model E Sportster	110 hp Scarab radial	1931	4	One wing survives at the EAA AirVenture Museum
Model YW Senior Sportster	Pratt and Whiney Wasp Jr./Wasp C radial	1931	1	Won more races and more prize money than any other Gee Bee, Maude Tait won the 1931 Aerol trophy, set the closed course speed record for women and won the Shell Oil speed trophy for women. It competed in the 1931 and 1933 Thompson trophy races finishing 4th and 5th
Model YL Senior Sportster	Lycoming R-680/Whirlwind	1931	1	Lycoming test bed, later fitted with 575 hp Wright Whirlwind
Model Z Super Sportster	525 hp Pratt and Whitney Wasp Jr./Wasp Sr. radial	1931	1	1931 Thompson Trophy winner
Model Q Ascender	Aeronca twin	1931	1	Canard
Model R-1 Super Sportster	P&W Wasp T3D1/Hornet radial	1931	1	1932 Thompson Trophy winner Set world speed record, Shell Speed Dash winner
Model R-2 Super Sportster	525 hp Pratt and Witney Wasp Jr./Wasp T3D1	1931	1	Cracked an oil line and did not finish in the 1932 Bendix, pilot Russell Thaw withdrew from the 1933 Bendix
Tiger/Mickey Mouse	Armstrong Siddeley Genet radial	1932	1	Designed by Ed Granville; Dismantled after a few flights
"Long Tail"	Hornet radial	1933	1	R-1/R-2 Hybrid rebuilt from R-1 and 1932 R-2 wings Named "Intestinal Fortitude" sold to Cecil Allen 1933
Aeromobile	Menasco Pirate inline	(1933)	0	Roadable airplane
Model C-4 Fourster	Wasp Jr. radial	(1933)	0	plans only, 4-seat airliner
Model C-6 Sixster	unk.	(1933)	0	plans only, 6-seat airliner
Model C-8 Eightster	Hornet radial	(1933)	0	uncompleted, 8-seat airliner
Model R-5	Hornet radial	(1933)	0	plans only, Basis for R-6
Model R-6C	Curtiss Conqueror V-12	(1934)	0	plans only, engine unavailable, Completed as R-6H
Model R-6H	Hornet radial	1934	1	"Q.E.D." built for MacRobertson Race; Set Mexico City to Washington D.C. record as "Conquistador del Cielo". Survivor in a museum in, Ciudad Lerdo, Mexico

== Replica and reproduction Gee Bee aircraft ==
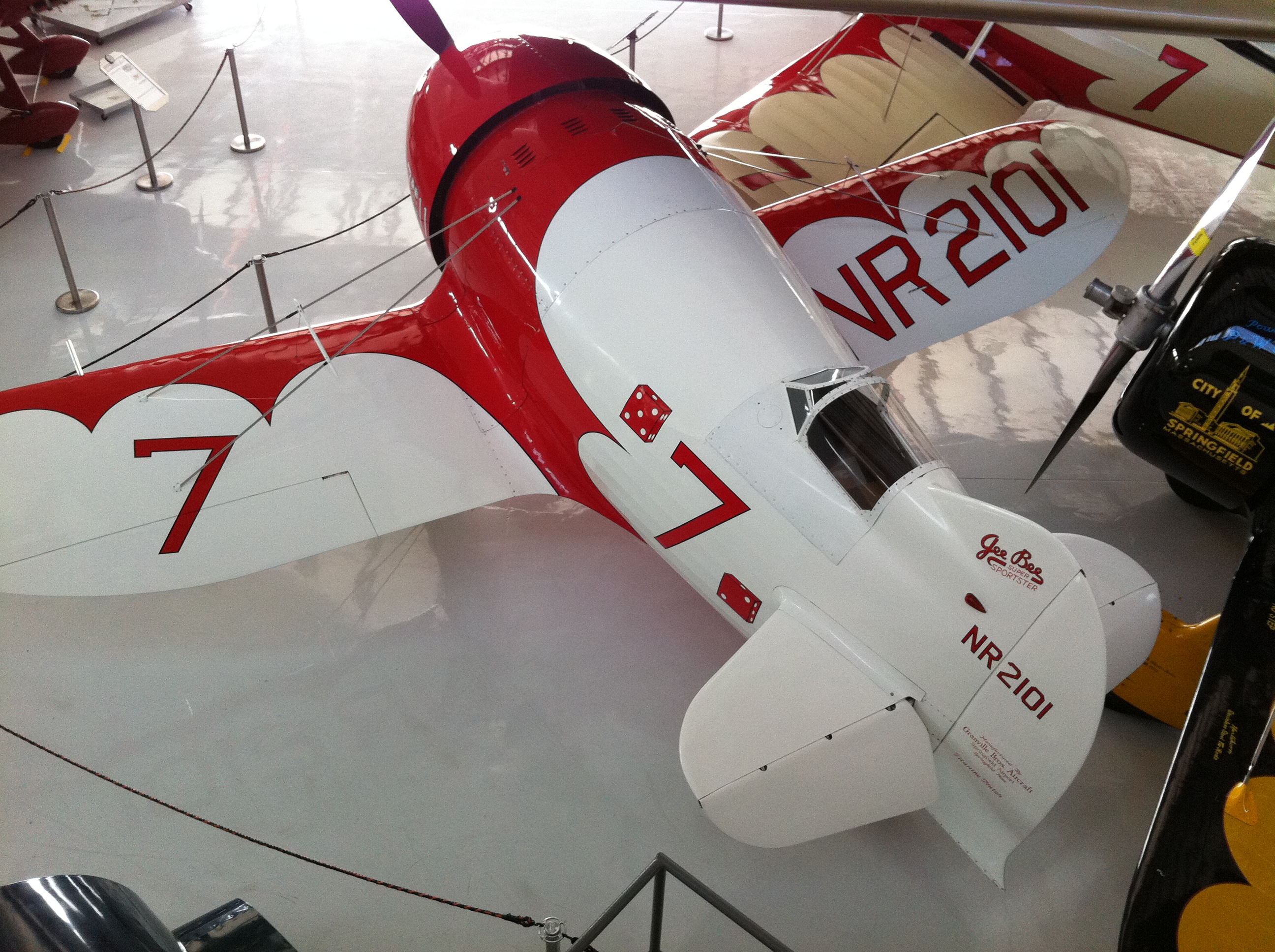
Airworthy Gee Bee R-2 Super Sportster replica at Fantasy of Flight

A Model E replica was flown and wrecked before being donated to the Evergreen Aviation & Space Museum in McMinnville, Oregon. Another Model E replica was being built in Australia.

A replica of Florence Klingensmith's Model YL was completed in 1984 powered by a 300 hp (220 kW) Lycoming R-680.

A Model Z replica first flown in 1978 was used by the Walt Disney Company in the film The Rocketeer (1991), which is now on display at the Seattle Museum of Flight. A second Gee Bee Z replica was sold to Fantasy of Flight.

The New England Air Museum and the San Diego Air & Space Museum have each completed replica R-1s with help from the Granvilles under the agreement that the aircraft will never be flown. The Crawford Auto-Aviation Museum in Cleveland, Ohio also has an R-1 replica on display as of June 2018. The Springfield, Massachusetts Museum of Springfield History has a full size static fiberglass replica of the R-1 hanging in the atrium. A Gee Bee R-2 Super Sportster replica flown extensively since 1991 is now at Fantasy of Flight.

A highly modified replica of the Gee Bee R-6 powered by a 1,425 hp (1,063 kW) Wright R-1820 Cyclone was first flown on 26 September 2013.

== See also ==
- New Hampshire Historical Marker No. 207: Granville Homestead
