= Granville Gee Bee Sportster =

American racing aircraft

Sportster
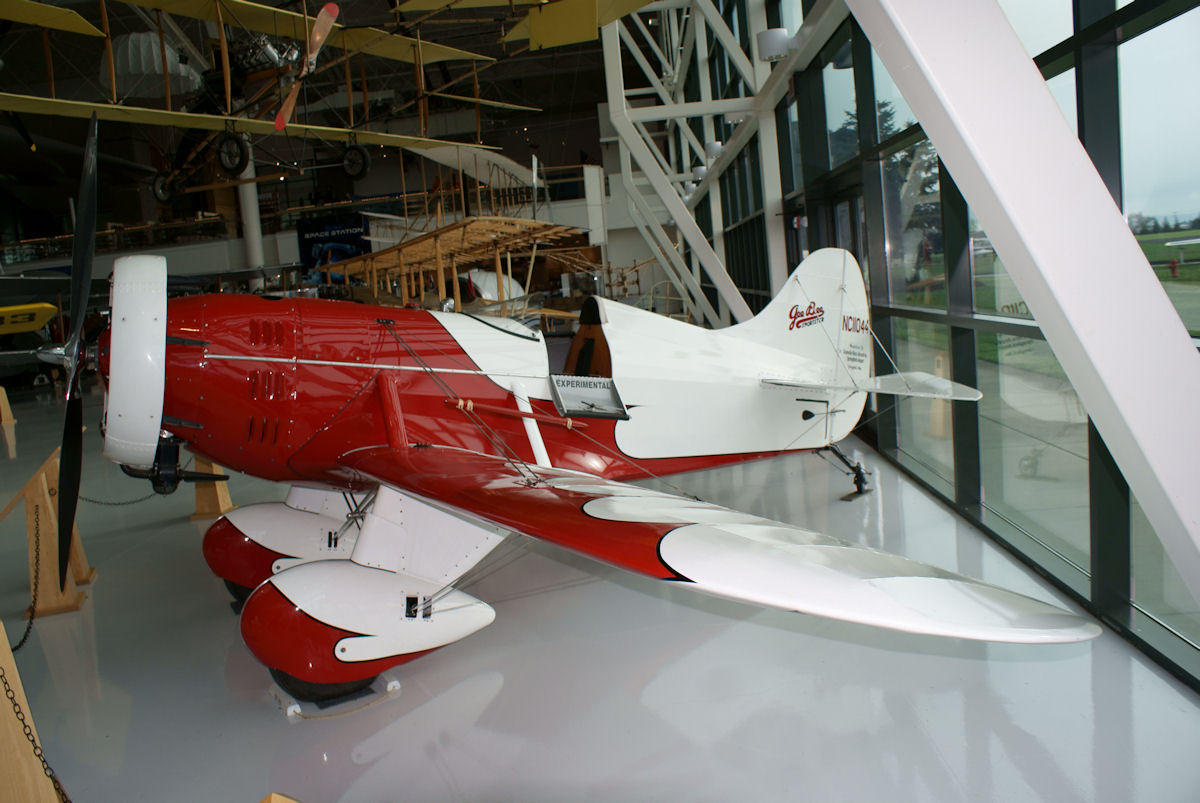
- Gee Bee Model E Sportster replica

General information
- Type: Sports plane
- National origin: United States of America
- Manufacturer: Granville Brothers
- Designer: Robert Hall
- Number built: 8

History
- First flight: 1930

The Gee Bee Sportster was a family of sports aircraft built in the United States in the early 1930s by the Granville Brothers. They were low-wing strut- and wire-braced monoplanes of conventional, if short-coupled, design, with open cockpits and fixed, tailskid undercarriage.

== History ==
The prototype of the small series, designated Model X was built to compete in the 1930 All-American Flying Derby sponsored by the Cirrus Engine Company. The Model X, piloted by Lowell Bayles placed second in the race from Detroit to San Francisco and back, averaging 116.4 mph (186.7 km/h) over the 5,541 mile (8,887 km) distance. Bayles used his share of the $7,000 prize money to purchase the aircraft. The same year, two generally similar aircraft were built, one Model B and one Model C. These differed from the Model X by having landing gear that incorporated shock absorbers, as opposed to the Model X's rigid landing gear that relied on its tires for shock absorption; but while the Model B had a similar Cirrus engine to the Model X, the Model C was fitted with a Menasco B-4.

The Models X, A, and B were granted only restricted registrations by the Department of Commerce, meaning that they could be flown under very specific conditions and only in specific places. In order to obtain unrestricted certification, Granville Brothers produced a revised version called the Model D, the most significant difference being a redesigned and larger tail fin. A similar fin was later fitted to the Model C, enabling it to also gain an unrestricted registration. The sole example of the Model D built was flown in competition at the Cleveland air races of 1931, where Bob Hall won the Williams Trophy with it, and Mary Haizlip placed second in two of the women's events.

The definitive member of the Sportster family was the Model E, which was fitted with a Warner Scarab radial engine in place of the inline engines used on the previous models. Four of these aircraft were built, and it was in one of them that Zantford Granville was killed in February 1934, attempting to land after an engine failure while avoiding people working on the runway below.

== Variants ==
- Model X - ACE Ensign engine, rigid main undercarriage (one built)
- Model B - ACE Ensign engine, shock absorbers (one built)
- Model C - Menasco B-4 engine (one built)
- Model D - Menasco C-4 engine, larger fin (one built)
- Model E - Warner Scarab engine (four built)
- Model F - Model X re-engined with a Fairchild 6-390 (one converted)

== Specifications (Model E) ==
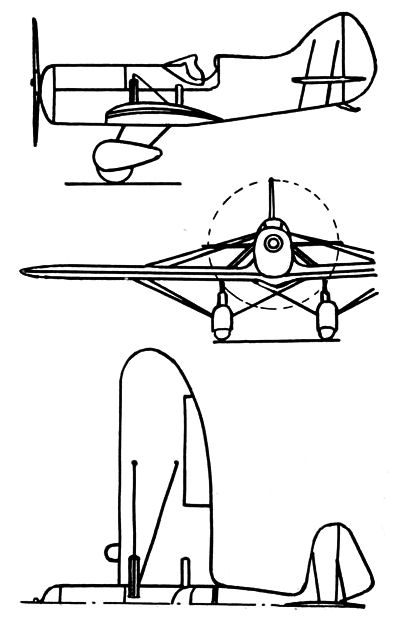
Gee Bee Sportster 3-view drawing from L'Aerophile Salon 1932

General characteristics

- Crew: one pilot
- Length: 17 ft 3 in (5.26 m)
- Wingspan: 25 ft 0 in (7.62 m)
- Height: 6 ft 0 in (1.83 m)
- Wing area: 95 sq ft (8.8 m^{2})
- Empty weight: 912 lb (414 kg)
- Powerplant: 1 × Warner Scarab , 110 hp (82 kW)

Performance

- Maximum speed: 189 mph (305 km/h, 164 kn)
- Rate of climb: 1,100 ft/min (5.6 m/s)
