= List of civil aircraft (A–M) =

List of civil aircraft is a list of articles on civilian aircraft with descriptions, which excludes aircraft operated by military organizations in civil markings, warbirds, warbirds used for racing, replica warbirds and research aircraft.

== A ==
=== ABC Motors ===
- ABC Robin single-seat cabin monoplane

=== Abraham ===
- Abraham Iris I and II two-seat parasol monoplane

=== Abrams ===
- Abrams P-1 Explorer pusher survey aircraft

=== Ace Aircraft Manufacturing Company ===
- Ace Baby Ace single-seat parasol monoplane ultralight homebuilt
- Ace Junior Ace single-seat parasol monoplane ultralight homebuilt
- Ace Scooter single-seat parasol monoplane ultralight homebuilt

=== Acro Sport ===
- Acro Sport I single-seat aerobatic biplane
- Acro Sport II two-seat aerobatic biplane
- Pober Pixie single-seat parasol monoplane
- Pober Super Ace single-seat parasol monoplane

=== Adam Aircraft Industries ===
- Adam A500 twin piston engined executive passenger aircraft
- Adam A700 executive jet

=== Adcox ===
- Adcox Student Prince two-seat open biplane

=== Advanced Aerodynamics and Structures Inc. ===
- AASI Jetcruzer turboprop canard pusher

=== Advanced Vehicle Engineers ===
- AVE Mizar flying car based on Ford Pinto

=== Aerial Distributors ===
- Distributor Wing DWI-1 low-wing twin-engine turboprop crop duster

=== Aero Engineers Australia ===
- AEA Explorer single-engine utility aircraft
- AEA Maverick single-seat sportsplane

=== Aero-Flight ===
- Aero-Flight Streak two-seat low wing monoplane

=== Aermacchi ===
(for earlier types see Macchi)

- Aermacchi AL-60 utility aircraft
- Aermacchi SF.260 two-seat trainer and aerobatics aircraft

=== Aero AT ===
- Aero AT-1 two-seat low-wing ultralight
- Aero AT-2, 3 & 4 two-seat low-wing ultralight

=== Aero Boero ===
- Aero Boero AB-95/115 three-seat high-wing utility aircraft
- Aero Boero AB-150 and AB-180 three-seat high-wing utility aircraft
- Aero Boero AB-210 high-wing utility aircraft prototype
- Aero Boero 260AG low-wing agricultural aircraft

=== Aéro Club du Bas Armagnac ===
- ACBA Midour monoplane glider tugs

=== Aero Commander ===
- Aero Commander 100 four-seat light aircraft
- Aero Commander 500/600 series twin-engine business aircraft
- Aero Commander Jet Commander business jet

=== Aero Vodochody ===
- Aero A.10 biplane five-passenger airliner
- Aero A.22 biplane two-passenger airliner
- Aero A.23 biplane seven-passenger airliner
- Aero A.34 Kos two-seat light aircraft
- Aero A.35 five-passenger airliner
- Aero A.38 eight-passenger airliner
- Aero A.200 single-engine low-wing monoplane
- Aero A.204 twin-engine monoplane airliner prototype
- Aero Ae 45 & Ae 145 twin-engine light aircraft

=== Aerokopter ===
- Aerokopter AK1-3 Sanka two-seat helicopter

=== Aeromarine/Aeromarine-Klemm ===
- Aeromarine 50 single-engine biplane flying-boat airliner developed from bomber
- Aeromarine 75 twin-engine biplane flying-boat airliner developed from bomber
- Aeromarine AM-1 & 2 single-engine biplane mailplane
- Aeromarine-Klemm 70 two-seat monoplane

=== Aeromot ===
- Aeromot AMT-100 Ximango two-seat motor glider
- Aeromot AMT-200 Super Ximango two-seat motor glider

=== Aeronca ===
- Aeronca 6 two-seat high-wing monoplane
- Aeronca 7 Champion two-seat high-wing monoplane
- Aeronca 9 Arrow two-seat low-wing monoplane
- Aeronca 11 Chief two-seat high-wing monoplane
- Aeronca 12 Chum two-seat low-wing monoplane (licence-built Ercoupe)
- Aeronca 15 Sedan four-seat high-wing monoplane
- Aeronca 50 Chief two-seat high-wing monoplane
- Aeronca 65 Super Chief two-seat high-wing monoplane
- Aeronca C-1 Cadet single-seat monoplane
- Aeronca C-2 single-seat monoplane
- Aeronca C-3 single-seat monoplane
- Aeronca K two-seat high-wing monoplane
- Aeronca L low-wing monoplane

=== Aero Spacelines ===
- Aero Spacelines Pregnant Guppy piston engined oversize-cargo aircraft
- Aero Spacelines Super Guppy turboprop oversize-cargo
- Aero Spacelines Mini Guppy piston engined oversize-cargo
- Aero Spacelines Mini Guppy Turbine turboprop oversize-cargo

=== Aérospatiale ===
(see also Eurocopter & SOCATA)

- Aérospatiale Alouette II & Lama light utility helicopters
- Aérospatiale Alouette III light utility helicopter
- Aérospatiale N 262 & Mohawk 298 turboprop airliner
- Aérospatiale Puma twin-engine medium-lift helicopter
- Aérospatiale Gazelle utility helicopter
- Aérospatiale Écureuil & Écureuil 2 light utility helicopter
- Aérospatiale Dauphin mid-size utility helicopter
- Aérospatiale Corvette business jet
- Aérospatiale-British Aerospace Concorde supersonic airliner

=== Aerostar ===
- Aerostar Festival light sport aircraft

=== Aetna ===
- Aetna Aerocraft S-2 two-seat open low-wing monoplane

=== Agusta and AgustaWestland ===
- Agusta A109 utility/corporate helicopter
- Agusta A119 Koala utility helicopter
- AgustaWestland AW139 medium lift utility helicopter
- AgustaWestland AW169 utility helicopter
- AgustaWestland AW189 medium-lift helicopter

=== Ahrens ===
- Ahrens AR 404 four-engine turboprop utility aircraft

=== Air Tractor ===
- Air Tractor AT-300, 301 and 302 piston & turboprop crop dusters
- Air Tractor AT-400, 401 and 402 piston & turboprop crop dusters
- Air Tractor AT-500, 501, 502, 503 and 504 piston & turboprop crop dusters
- Air Tractor AT-602 turboprop crop duster
- Air Tractor AT-802 turboprop crop duster
- Air Tractor AT-1002 turboprop crop duster

=== Aichi ===
- Aichi AB-4 transport/airliner flying boat

=== Airbus ===
- Airbus A220 short haul jetliner (formerly Bombardier CSeries)
- Airbus A300 widebody jetliner
- Airbus A310 widebody jetliner
- Airbus A318 twin-engine jetliner
- Airbus A319 twin-engine jetliner and large corporate jet
- Airbus A320 twin-engine jetliner
- Airbus A320neo twin-engine jetliner
- Airbus A321 twin-engine jetliner
- Airbus A321neo twin-engine jetliner
- Airbus A330 widebody jetliner
- Airbus A330neo widebody jetliner
- Airbus A340 widebody four-engine jetliner
- Airbus A350 widebody jetliner
- Airbus A380 four-engine high-capacity widebody jetliner
- Airbus Beluga oversize cargo aircraft
- Airbus BelugaXL oversize cargo aircraft

=== Airco ===
(for later designs see de Havilland)

- Airco DH.9C passenger biplane converted from bomber
- Airco DH.16 biplane airliner

=== Aircraft Designs ===
- ADI Bumble Bee ultralight homebuilt autogyro
- ADI Condor pusher homebuilt motorglider
- ADI Sportster two-seat autogyro
- ADI Stallion six-seat homebuilt high-wing monoplane

=== Airspeed ===
- Airspeed Ambassador twin-engine airliner
- Airspeed Consul twin-engine monoplane airliner
- Airspeed Courier single-engine cabin monoplane
- Airspeed Envoy twin-engine monoplane airliner
- Airspeed Ferry trimotor biplane airliner
- Airspeed Viceroy twin-engine monoplane racer

=== Air Creation ===
- Air Creation Racer ultralight
- Air Creation GT ultralight
- Air Creation Clipper ultralight
- Air Creation Tanarg ultralight
- Air Creation Trek ultralight
- Air Creation Twin ultralight
- Air Creation Skypper ultralight

=== Albatros ===
- Albatros L 58 single-engine monoplane airliner
- Albatros L 59 single-seat monoplane sportsplane
- Albatros L 60 two-seat monoplane utility/sportsplane
- Albatros L 72 single-engine newspaper delivery biplane
- Albatros L 73 twin-engined biplane airliner
- Albatros L 79 Kobold single-seat aerobatic biplane

=== Alcor ===
- Alcor C-6-1 Junior twin-engine low-wing airliner
- Alcor Duo-4 twin-engine high-wing airliner
- Alcor Duo-6 twin-engine high-wing airliner

=== Aleksandrov-Kalinin ===
- Aleksandrov-Kalinin AK-1 single-engine monoplane airliner

=== Alexander Aircraft Company ===
- Alexander Bullet four-seat low-wing monoplane
- Alexander Eaglerock three-seat utility biplane
- Alexander Flyabout D two-seat monoplane

=== All American ===
- All American Ensign two-seat low wing monoplane

=== Allegro LSA ===
- Allegro 2007 two-seat light sport

=== Alliance ===
- Alliance A-1 Argo two-seat open biplane

=== Alon ===
- Alon A-2 Aircoupe two-seat monoplane, updated Erco Ercoupe

=== Alpha ===
- Alpha 2000 Robin R2000 manufactured in New Zealand

=== American Aviation ===
- American Aviation AA-1 Yankee & Trainer two-seat light aircraft
- American Aviation AA-2 Patriot four-seat light aircraft prototype

=== American Champion ===
- American Champion & Bellanca two-seat utility/aerobatic light aircraft

=== American Eagle ===
- American Eagle A-101 three-seat open-cockpit sports/utility biplane
- American Eagle A-129 three-seat open-cockpit sports/utility biplane
- American Eagle Eaglet two-seat high-wing ultralight

=== American Gyro ===
- American Gyro AG-4 Crusader small twin-engine cabin sportsplane

=== Anderson ===
- Anderson Kingfisher high-wing monoplane amphibious homebuilt

=== Anderson Greenwood ===
- Anderson Greenwood AG-14 two-seat pusher utility monoplane

=== ANEC ===
- ANEC I single-seat ultralight monoplane
- ANEC III single engine mailplane and airliner

=== Angel Aircraft Corporation ===
- AAC Angel twin-engine utility aircraft

=== Ansaldo ===
- Ansaldo A.300C & T single-engine biplane airliner

=== Antonov ===
- Antonov An-2 biplane utility transport
- Antonov An-10 turboprop transport
- Antonov An-12 turboprop cargo aircraft
- Antonov An-14 utility transport aircraft
- Antonov An-22 Large capacity turboprop cargo aircraft
- Antonov An-24 airliner and utility aircraft
- Antonov An-28 Regional airliner and utility transport
- Antonov An-30 aerial survey aircraft
- Antonov An-38 Regional airliner and utility transport
- Antonov An-70 heavylift propfan cargo aircraft
- Antonov An-72 STOL utility transport
- Antonov An-74 STOL utility transport
- Antonov An-124 Ruslan heavylift freighter
- Antonov An-140 turboprop airliner
- Antonov An-148 regional airliner
- Antonov An-225 Mriya large cargo aircraft

=== Antoinette ===
- Antoinette VII sporting monoplane

=== APM ===
- APM 20 Lionceau light utility aircraft
- APM 30 Lion light utility aircraft

=== Arado ===
- Arado S I & S III two-seat trainers
- Arado SC I two-seat trainer
- Arado SC II two-seat trainer
- Arado L I two-seat light aircraft
- Arado L II two-seat light aircraft
- Arado V I prototype four passenger airliner and air mail carrier
- Arado W 2 two-seat seaplane trainer
- Arado Ar 79 two-seat aerobatic trainer and touring monoplane

=== Arctic Aircraft ===
- Arctic Aircraft Arctic Tern light sportsplane

=== Argonaut ===
- Argonaut Pirate amphibious monoplane

=== Armstrong Whitworth ===
- Armstrong Whitworth Argosy three-engine biplane airliner
- Armstrong Whitworth Atalanta four-engine monoplane airliner
- Armstrong Whitworth Ensign four-engine monoplane airliner
- Armstrong Whitworth Apollo four-engine turboprop airliner prototype
- Armstrong Whitworth Argosy four-engine turboprop cargo aircraft

=== Arrow ===
- Arrow Sport two-seat light aircraft
- Arrow Model F two-seat low-wing monoplane

=== Arup ===
- Arup S-2 single-seat flying wing
- Arup S-4 two-seat flying wing

=== Atlantic Aircraft ===
(Fokker America, for Dutch aircraft see Fokker)

- Fokker Universal single-engine monoplane transport
- Fokker Super Universal single-engine monoplane transport
- Fokker F.10 trimotor high-wing monoplane airliner
- Fokker F.11 utility flying boat
- Fokker F.14 single-engine parasol monoplane transport
- Fokker F.32 four-engine high-wing monoplane airliner

=== Atlas ===
- Atlas H-10 four-seat twin-engine low wing monoplane

=== ATR ===
- ATR 42 turboprop regional airliner
- ATR 72 turboprop regional airliner

=== Auster ===
- Auster J-1 Autocrat three-seat light aircraft
- Auster J-1U Workmaster agricultural aircraft
- Auster J-2 Arrow two-seat light aircraft
- Auster J-3 Atom two-seat light aircraft
- Auster J-4 two-seat light aircraft
- Auster Avis prototype light utility aircraft
- Auster Autocar four-seat light aircraft
- Auster Aiglet Trainer aerobatic four-seat light aircraft
- Auster Alpine four-seat light aircraft
- Auster B.4 prototype light cargo aircraft
- Auster Agricola agricultural aircraft
- Auster D.4 two-seat light aircraft

=== Austin ===
- Austin Whippet single-seat sports biplane

=== Avia ===
- Avia BH-1 two-seat light aircraft
- Avia BH-5 two-seat light aircraft
- Avia BH-9 two-seat light aircraft
- Avia BH-10 single-seat aerobatic aircraft
- Avia BH-12 two-seat light aircraft
- Avia BH-16 single-seat light aircraft
- Avia BH-20 two-seat trainer
- Avia BH-25 biplane airliner
- Avia 14 turboprop airliner

=== Aviamilano ===
- Aviamilano A2 Standard sailplane
- Aviamilano CPV1 competition sailplane
- Aviamilano F.250 two-seat aerobatic monoplane
- Aviamilano F.260 two-seat aerobatic monoplane
- Aviamilano Falco two-seat aerobatic monoplane
- Aviamilano Nibbio four-seat cabin monoplane
- Aviamilano Scricciolo two-seat monoplane trainer

=== Aviat ===
- Aviat Husky two-seat utility light aircraft
- Aviat Pitts Special competition aerobatic biplane

=== Aviation Traders ===
- Aviation Traders Accountant prototype turboprop airliner
- Aviation Traders Carvair roll-on roll-off car freighter

=== Avid ===
- Avid Flyer high-wing monoplane kitplane

=== Aviméta ===
- Aviméta 132 monoplane trimotor airliner

=== Avro ===
- Avro G single-engine cabin biplane
- Avro 500 sporting biplane
- Avro 504 training biplane used for barnstorming
- Avro 534 Baby single-seat light aircraft
- Avro Avian two-seat light aircraft
- Avro 547 single-engine triplane airliner
- Avro 560 single-seat ultralight for Lympne trials
- Avro 618 Ten ten-passenger trimotor airliner (Fokker F.VII built under licence)
- Avro 619 Five five-passenger trimotor airliner
- Avro 624 Six six-passenger trimotor airliner
- Avro 627 Mailplane single-engine biplane mailplane
- Avro 631 Cadet two-seat open sports and training biplane
- Avro 638 Club Cadet two-seat open sports and training biplane
- Avro 641 Commodore single-engine cabin biplane
- Avro 642 Eighteen two or four-engine monoplane airliner
- Avro 652 twin-engine airliner
- Avro Anson twin-engine airliner
- Avro Lancastrian transport converted from Lancaster bomber
- Avro York four-engine airliner developed from Lancaster
- Avro Tudor four-engine airliner
- Avro 748 turboprop airliner a.k.a. HS 748 and BAe 748
- Avro RJ Series turbofan airliner, was BAe 146

=== Avro Canada ===
- Avro Canada Jetliner jet airliner

=== Avtek ===
- Avtek 400 twin-turboprop canard utility airliner

=== Ayres ===
- Ayres Let L 610 regional airliner
- Ayres Thrush & Rockwell Thrush Commander agricultural aircraft

== B ==
=== BAC (British Aircraft Company) ===
- British Aircraft Company Drone single-seat ultralight

=== BAC (British Aircraft Corporation) ===
- Concorde supersonic airliner
- BAC One-Eleven jetliner

=== Bach ===
- Bach Air Yacht high-wing monoplane trimotor airliner

=== BAe ===
- BAe 125 business jet
- BAe 146 four-engine regional airliner
- BAe ATP twin-engine turboprop airliner
- BAe Jetstream twin-turboprop airliner
- BAe Jetstream 41 twin-turboprop airliner

=== Barkley-Grow ===
- Barkley-Grow T8P-1 twin-engine airliner

=== Barnhart ===
- Barnhart Twin 15 Wampus Kat twin-engine biplane airliner

=== BAT ===
- BAT F.K.26 single-engine biplane cabin airliner

=== Bäumer ===
- Bäumer Sausewind open-cockpit two-seat sport monoplane

=== Beagle Aircraft ===
- Beagle Airedale four-seat high-wing light aircraft
- Beagle Husky high-wing light aircraft
- Beagle Pup low-wing light aircraft
- Beagle Terrier high-wing three-seat light aircraft
- Beagle Basset light twin-engine utility aircraft

=== Beardmore ===
- Beardmore Wee Bee ultralight

=== Bede ===
- Bede BD-1 two-seat prototype design
- Bede BD-4 four-seat homebuilt monoplane
- Bede BD-5 single-seat jet or piston-powered sport aircraft

=== Beechcraft ===
- Beechcraft Model 17 Staggerwing cabin biplane
- Beechcraft Model 18 twin-engine utility transport
- Beechcraft Model 19 Musketeer four-seat light aircraft
- Beechcraft Model 23 Sundowner four-seat light aircraft
- Beechcraft Model 24 Sierra four-seat light aircraft
- Beechcraft Model 33 Bonanza four/six-seat light aircraft
- Beechcraft Model 34 Twin Quad four-engine airliner
- Beechcraft Model 35 Bonanza four/six-seat light aircraft
- Beechcraft Model 36 Bonanza four/six-seat light aircraft
- Beechcraft Model 50 Twin Bonanza six-seat light twin
- Beechcraft Model 55 Baron four or six-seat light twin
- Beechcraft Model 56 Baron four or six-seat light twin
- Beechcraft Model 58 Baron four or six-seat light twin
- Beechcraft Model 60 Duke four or six-seat high-performance twin
- Beechcraft Model 65 Queen Air
- Beechcraft Model 70 Queen Air
- Beechcraft Model 76 Duchess four-seat light twin
- Beechcraft Model 77 Skipper two-seat trainer
- Beechcraft Model 80 Queen Air
- Beechcraft Model 85 Queen Air
- Beechcraft Model 88 Queen Air utility transport
- Beechcraft Model 90 King Air utility transport
- Beechcraft Model 95 Travel Air four-seat light twin
- Beechcraft Model 99 Airliner commuter airliner
- Beechcraft Model 100 King Air utility transport
- Beechcraft Model 200 Super King Air utility transport
- Beechcraft Model 300 Super King Air utility transport
- Beechcraft Model 1300 Airliner commuter airliner
- Beechcraft Model 1900 Airliner regional airliner/executive transport
- Beechcraft Starship 2000 corporate transport
- Hawker 400 Beechjet light corporate jet
- Beechcraft 220 Denali Single-turboprop high-performance utility aircraft
- Beechcraft Premier Twin-turbofan-engined utility aircraft (entry level jet)

=== Beecraft ===
- Beecraft Honey Bee single-seat high-wing cabin monoplane
- Beecraft Queen Bee four-seat low-wing monoplane
- Beecraft Wee Bee monoplane flown from prone position on top of fuselage

=== Bell Helicopter ===
- Bell 47 three-seat utility helicopter
- Bell 204 and 205 (Huey) utility helicopter
- Bell 206 JetRanger, LongRanger & Twinranger light utility helicopter
- Bell 212 medium lift utility helicopter
- Bell 214 medium transport helicopter
- Bell 222 & 230 utility helicopters
- Bell 407 seven-seat utility helicopter
- Bell 412 medium-lift utility helicopter
- Bell 427 light utility helicopter
- Bell 429 utility helicopter
- Bell 430 helicopter
- Bell BA 609 corporate/utility tiltrotor

=== Bellanca ===
- Bellanca CF single-engine four-seat cabin monoplane
- Wright-Bellanca WB-2 single-engine cabin transport and distance record aircraft
- Bellanca CH-300 Pacemaker single-engine cabin transport
- Bellanca CH-400 Skyrocket single-engine cabin transport
- Bellanca Aircruiser large single-engine cabin transport
- Bellanca 28-70 single-engine racing monoplane
- Bellanca 28-92 trimotor racing monoplane
- Bellanca 31-40 Senior Pacemaker single-engine cabin transport
- Bellanca 31-50 Senior Skyrocket single-engine cabin transport
- Bellanca 14-7 single-engine cabin sports monoplane
- Bellanca 14-13 single-engine cabin sports monoplane
- Bellanca 17-30 Viking single-engine cabin sports monoplane
- Bellanca Skyrocket II single-engine 6-seat monoplane

=== Beneš-Mráz ===
- Beneš-Mráz Be-50 Beta-Minor two-seat open-cockpit sporting monoplane
- Beneš-Mráz Be-60 Bestiola two-seat cabin sporting high-wing monoplane
- Beneš-Mráz Be-550 Bibi two-seat cabin sporting low-wing monoplane

=== Beriev ===
- Beriev MP-1 flying boat airliner
- Beriev Be-30/Be-32 regional airliner/utility transport
- Beriev Be-103 utility amphibian
- Beriev Be-200 firefighting and utility amphibian

=== Bernard ===
- Bernard 18 single-engine monoplane airliner
- Bernard 190 single-engine monoplane airliner
- Bernard 60 trimotor monoplane airliner
- Bernard 200 touring monoplane

=== BFW ===
(for later designs see Messerschmitt)

- BFW M.17 two-seat ultralight sportsplane
- BFW M.18 single-engine high-wing monoplane airliner
- BFW M.19 low-wing single-seat sportsplane
- BFW M.20 single-engine high-wing monoplane airliner
- BFW M.23 two-seat sports monoplane
- BFW M.24 single-engine high-wing monoplane airliner
- BFW M.27 two-seat sports monoplane
- BFW M.29 two-seat sports/racing monoplane
- BFW M.35 two-seat sports monoplane

=== Blackburn ===
- Blackburn Bluebird two-seat open sports utility biplane
- Blackburn Kangaroo twin-engine biplane converted into airliner
- Blackburn Segrave four-seat twin-engine cabin monoplane
- Blackburn Sidecar two-seat 1920s ultralight

=== Blériot ===
- Blériot XI sportsplane and racing monoplane
- Blériot XII passenger airplane
- Blériot XXIII racing monoplane
- Blériot XXIV Limousine passenger airplane
- Blériot 75 Aerobus four-engine biplane airliner
- Blériot 110 single-engine distance record aircraft
- Blériot 111 single-engine airliner monoplane
- Blériot 115 four-engine biplane airliner
- Blériot 125 twin-engine twin fuselage airliner
- Blériot 135 four-engine biplane airliner
- Blériot 155 four-engine biplane airliner
- Blériot 290 single-engine touring amphibian
- Blériot 5190 monoplane flying boat mailplane

=== Blériot-SPAD ===
- Blériot-SPAD S.27 single-engine three-seat airliner
- Blériot-SPAD S.29 single-engine sports/trainer biplane
- Blériot-SPAD S.33 single-engine biplane airliner
- Blériot-SPAD S.45 twin-engine biplane airliner
- Blériot-SPAD S.46 single-engine biplane airliner
- Blériot-SPAD S.50 single-engine biplane airliner
- Blériot-SPAD S.56 single-engine biplane airliner

=== Bloch ===
- Bloch MB.60 single-engine monoplane airliner
- Bloch MB.90 two-seat light aircraft
- Bloch MB.120 trimotor monoplane airliner
- Bloch MB.160 four-engine airliner developed into the SNCASE Languedoc
- Bloch MB.220 twin-engine monoplane airliner
- Bloch MB.300 Pacifique twin-engine monoplane airliner

=== Blohm + Voss ===
- Blohm & Voss Ha 139 four-engine monoplane floatplane mailplane
- Blohm & Voss BV 142 four-engine monoplane transatlantic mailplane

=== Boeing ===
- Boeing B-1 biplane flying boat mailplane
- Boeing Model 40 biplane air mail carrier/airliner
- Boeing Model 80 biplane airliner
- Boeing Model 221 Monomail single-engine monoplane mailplane
- Boeing 247 twin-engine low-wing monoplane airliner
- Boeing 307 Stratoliner four-engine low-wing monoplane airliner
- Boeing 314 Clipper Flying boat airliner
- Boeing 367-80 jet airliner development aircraft
- Boeing 377 Stratocruiser propeller airliner
- Boeing 707 four-jet airliner and freighter
- Boeing 717 short- to medium-range airliner
- Boeing 720 medium-range four-jet airliner
- Boeing 727 short- to medium-range airliner
- Boeing 737 short- to medium-range airliner
- Boeing 747 long-range high-capacity widebody airliner
- Boeing 757 twin-jet airliner
- Boeing 767 twin-jet airliner
- Boeing 777 long-range widebody airliners
- Boeing 787 Dreamliner widebody airliner
- Boeing Business Jet long-range large corporate jet
- Boeing 2707 Supersonic airliner project
- Boeing Vertol V.107 heavylift utility helicopter
- Boeing Commercial Chinook heavylift utility and airliner helicopter
- Boeing Stearman two-seat utility and agricultural biplane

=== Boeing Canada ===
- Boeing-Canada C-204 Thunderbird 4-seat utility biplane flying boat
- Boeing-Canada A-213 Totem monoplane utility flying boat

=== Boisavia ===
- Boisavia Mercurey four-seat cabin monoplane
- Boisavia Chablis two-seat open-cockpit monoplane kitplane

=== Bölkow ===
- Bölkow Bo 207 four-seat light aircraft
- Bölkow Bo 208 two-seat light aircraft
- Bölkow Phoebus single-seat competition sailplane
- Bölkow Phönix single-seat competition sailplane

=== Bombardier ===
- Bombardier Challenger 300 corporate jet
- Bombardier Challenger 600/601/604/605 long-range corporate jets
- Bombardier Challenger 850 large long-range corporate jet
- Bombardier CSeries CS100/CS300 narrowbody airliner
- Bombardier CRJ100/200 CRJ100/CRJ200/CRJ400/CRJ550/ regional jet/business jet
- Bombardier CRJ700 series CRJ700/CRJ900/CRJ1000 regional jet
- Bombardier Global 5000 long-range high-capacity corporate jet
- Bombardier Global 7500 long-range high-capacity corporate jet
- Bombardier Global 8000 long-range high-capacity corporate jet
- Bombardier Global Express long range, high-capacity corporate jet
- Bombardier Learjet 40 corporate jet
- Bombardier Learjet 45 corporate jet
- Bombardier Learjet 55 & 60 corporate jets
- Bombardier Learjet 70/75 corporate jet
- Bombardier Learjet 85 corporate jet
- Bombardier Dash Q400 Turboprop airliner
- Bombardier Dash Q300 Turboprop airliner

=== Bonomi ===
- Bonomi BS.19 Alca single-seat motor glider
- Bonomi BS.22 Alzavola single-seat motor glider

=== Boom Supersonic ===
- XB-1 one-third-scale trijet supersonic demonstrator
- Boom Overture planned supersonic airliner

=== Boulton & Paul ===
- Boulton Paul P.6 two-seat open biplane
- Boulton & Paul P.64 Mailplane twin-engine biplane mailplane
- Boulton & Paul P.71A twin-engine biplane mailplane
- Boulton Paul Phoenix single-engined two-seat parasol monoplane ultralight

=== Brantly ===
- Brantly B-2 & 305 Light piston-powered utility helicopters

=== Breese ===
- Breese-Dallas Model 1 single-engine monoplane airliner
- Breese-Wilde Model 5 single-engine monoplane racer

=== Breda ===
- Breda Ba.15 two-seat light sportsplane
- Breda Ba.32 trimotor airliner
- Breda Ba.33 two-seat light sportsplane
- Breda Ba.39 two-seat touring monoplane
- Breda Ba.44 twin-engine biplane airliner
- Breda-Zappata BZ.308 four-engine airliner

=== Breguet ===
- Breguet 14T biplane bombers converted into mailplanes and airliners
- Breguet 22T single-engine biplane airliner
- Breguet 26T single-engine biplane airliner
- Breguet 280T single-engine biplane airliner
- Breguet 393T trimotor sesquiplane airliner
- Bréguet 470 Fulgur twin-engine monoplane airliner
- Bréguet 500 Colmar twin-engine monoplane airliner
- Breguet 530 Saigon trimotor biplane flying boat airliner
- Breguet 670 twin-engine monoplane airliner
- Breguet 760 Provence/Sahara four-engine double deck airliner/transport nicknamed Deux-Ponts
- Breguet 890 Mercure twin-engine transport
- Bréguet 900 Louisette sailplane
- Bréguet 941 4-engine airliner/transport

=== Bristol ===
- Bristol Badminton single-seat racing biplane
- Bristol Brownie 1920s monoplane ultralight
- Bristol Coupé & Bristol Tourer modified fighter as small airliner
- Bristol Pullman biplane airliner
- Bristol Type 62 Ten-seater biplane airliner
- Bristol Type 72 Racer racing monoplane
- Bristol Type 143 twin-engine airliner
- Bristol 167 Brabazon luxury long-range airliner
- Bristol 170 Freighter Short-range freighter/utility transport
- Bristol 175 Britannia long-range turboprop airliner

=== Brown-Young ===
- Brown-Young BY-1

=== British Aircraft Manufacturing ===
- British Aircraft Swallow two-seat ultralight monoplane
- British Aircraft Eagle two-seat cabin monoplane
- British Aircraft Double Eagle twin-engine 6-seat cabin monoplane

=== Britten-Norman ===
- Britten-Norman BN-1 single-seat ultralight
- Britten-Norman Islander Commuter airliner and light utility transport
- Britten-Norman Trislander Commuter airliner
- Britten-Norman Nymph 4-seat private aircraft

=== Brochet ===
- Brochet MB.50 single-seat open-cockpit ultralight
- Brochet MB.70 two-seat cabin monoplane
- Brochet MB.80 two-seat cabin monoplane
- Brochet MB.100 three-seat cabin monoplane

=== Brunner-Winkle ===
- Brunner-Winkle Bird three-seat open-cockpit passenger biplane

=== Buhl ===
- Buhl CA-1 Airster monoplane racer and mailplane
- Buhl-Verville CA-3 Airster three-seat utility biplane
- Buhl Airsedan single-engine utility cabin sesquiplane
- Buhl Bull Pup single-seat monoplane sportsplane

=== Burnelli ===
- Burnelli RB-1 biplane lifting body airliner
- Burnelli UB-14 monoplane lifting body airliner
- Burnelli UB-20 monoplane lifting body airliner
- Burnelli UB-22/GX-3 monoplane lifting body transport

== C ==
=== CAB ===
- CAB GY-20 Cab two-seat cabin monoplane
- CAB GY-30 Supercab two-seat cabin monoplane

=== CAMS ===
- CAMS 37 single-engine airmail flying boat
- CAMS 51 twin-engine airmail and passenger flying boat
- CAMS 53 twin-engine airmail and passenger flying boat
- CAMS 56 twin-engine airmail and passenger flying boat
- CAMS 58 twin-engine airmail and passenger flying boat
- CAMS 161 four-engine airliner flying boat

=== Canadair ===
- Canadair North Star four-engine airliner
- Canadair CL-44 Yukon airliner and freighter
- Canadair CL-215 waterbomber and utility amphibian
- Canadair CL-415 waterbomber and utility amphibian
- Canadair Challenger widebody corporate jet
- Canadair CRJ200 Regional Jet feederliner
- Canadair CRJ-700 Regional Jet feederliner

=== Canadian Vickers ===
- Canadian Vickers Vedette amphibious biplane forestry patrol flying boat

=== CAP Aviation (now Apex Aircraft) ===
- Mudry CAP 10 two-seat aerobatics aircraft and trainer
- Mudry CAP 20 competition aerobatics monoplane
- Mudry CAP 222 two-seat competition aerobatics monoplane
- Mudry CAP 230 single-seat aerobatic monoplane

=== Capelis ===
- Capelis XC-12 12 passenger twin-engine low-wing monoplane

=== Caproni ===
- Caproni Ca.48 airliner converted from bomber
- Caproni Ca.60 tandem triplane flying boat
- Caproni Ca.100 two-seat open sports/training biplane
- Caproni Ca.101 trimotor monoplane airliner
- Caproni Ca.123 twin engine monoplane airliner
- Caproni Ca.132 trimotor monoplane airliner
- Caproni Ca.133 trimotor monoplane airliner
- Caproni Ca.308 Borea twin-engine monoplane airliner
- Caproni Ca.309 twin-engine airliner

=== CASA ===
- CASA C-212 Aviocar STOL turboprop regional airliner and utility transport
- CASA CN-235 Utility transport and 45-seat regional airliner

=== Caudron ===
- Caudron C.21 twin-engine 3-seat touring biplane
- Caudron C.23bis twin-engine biplane airliner
- Caudron C.33 Landaulet Monsieur-Madame twin-engine biplane airliner
- Caudron C.37 twin-engine biplane airliner
- Caudron C.39 trimotor biplane airliner
- Caudron C.43 five-engine biplane airliner
- Caudron C.60 two-seat biplane trainer/sport aircraft
- Caudron C.61 trimotor airliner
- Caudron C.67 aerobatics biplane
- Caudron C.68 single-engine touring biplane
- Caudron C.74 four-engine airliner
- Caudron C.109 two-seat utility/sport parasol monoplane
- Caudron C.180 trimotor airliner
- Caudron C.190 two-seat sport monoplane
- Caudron C.230 sport biplane
- Caudron C.270 Luciole two-seat biplane trainer and touring aircraft
- Caudron C.280 Phalène utility monoplane
- Caudron C.440 Goéland twin-engine airliner
- Caudron C.480 Frégate three seat touring monoplane
- Caudron C.510 Pélican touring monoplane
- Caudron C.600 Aiglon two-seat sport monoplane
- Caudron C.630 Simoun single-engine transport
- Caudron C.640 Typhon twin-engine racing and mail monoplane

=== Central Aircraft ===
- Central Centaur IIA twin-engine passenger biplane
- Central Centaur IV single-engine passenger biplane

=== Cessna ===
- Cessna Model A
- Cessna CR-2 racing monoplane
- Cessna CR-3 racing monoplane
- Cessna C-34, C-37, C-38, C-145 & C-165 Airmaster series of light utility aircraft
- Cessna T-50 Bobcat/Crane
- Cessna 120 two-seat light aircraft, economy version of the Cessna 140
- Cessna 140 two-seat light aircraft.
- Cessna 150 & 152 two-seat primary and aerobatic trainers
- Cessna 162 Skycatcher two-seat light-sport aircraft
- Cessna 170 four-seat light aircraft
- Cessna 172 Skyhawk
- Cessna 175 Skylark four-seat light aircraft
- Cessna 177 Cardinal and Cardinal RG four-seat light aircraft
- Cessna 180 & 185 Skywagon utility aircraft
- Cessna 182 four-seat light aircraft
- Cessna 188 AGwagon, AGpickup, AGtruck, and AGhusky crop dusters
- Cessna 190 & 195 five-seat light aircraft with radial engine.
- Cessna 205, 206 & 207 six-seat utility aircraft.
- Cessna 208 Caravan I, Grand Caravan & Cargomaster turboprop utility transport
- Cessna 210 Centurion four- to six-seat light aircraft
- Cessna T303 Crusader six-seat corporate and utility transport
- Cessna 310 four- to six-seat light piston twin
- Cessna 320 Skyknight four- to six-seat light piston twin
- Cessna 336 & 337 Skymaster six-seat light piston twins
- Cessna 335 & 340 six-seat twin-engine airliner
- Cessna 350 & 400 four-seat light aircraft
- Cessna 401 & 402 twin-engine light transport
- Cessna 404 Titan ten-seat utility aircraft
- Cessna 406 Bushplane
- Cessna 408 SkyCourier turboprop utility transport
- Cessna 411 six- to eight-seat business twin
- Cessna 414 Chancellor pressurized cabin twin
- Cessna 421 Golden Eagle pressurized cabin twin
- Cessna 425 Corsair/Conquest I pressurized turboprop cabin twin
- Cessna 441 Conquest II pressurized turboprop cabin twin feederliner
- Cessna 500 & 501 Citation, Citation I & Citation I/SP light corporate jets
- Cessna 510 Citation Mustang light corporate jet
- Cessna 525 CJ1, CJ2, CJ3 & CJ4 CitationJet series light corporate jets
- Cessna 550 Citation II & 551 Citation II & Bravo light corporate jets
- Cessna 560 Citation V, Ultra & Ultra Encore small to midsize corporate jets
- Cessna 560XL Citation Excel corporate jet
- Cessna 650 Citation III, VI & VII corporate jets
- Cessna 680 Citation Sovereign corporate jet
- Cessna 750 Citation X long-range corporate jet
- Cessna 850 Citation Columbus intercontinental corporate jet
- Cessna Citation Longitude intercontinental corporate jet

=== Champion ===
- Champion Citabria two-seat high-wing aerobatic utility aircraft

=== Chester ===
- Chester Jeep racing monoplane
- Chester Goon racing monoplane

=== Chichester-Miles ===
- Chichester-Miles Leopard four-seat light jet

=== Chilton ===
- Chilton D.W.1 single-seat sportsplane

=== Chrislea ===
- Chrislea Ace four-seat light utility aircraft
- Chrislea Super Ace four-seat light utility aircraft
- Chrislea Skyjeep four-seat light utility aircraft

=== Christen ===
- Christen Eagle aerobatic homebuilt biplane

=== Cierva ===
- Cierva C.19 two-seat open-cockpit autogyro
- Cierva C.24 two-seat cabin autogyro
- Cierva C.30 two-seat open-cockpit autogyro
- Cierva C.29 5-seat cabin autogyro

=== Cirrus ===
- Cirrus SR20 & SR22 four- to five-seat light aircraft
- Cirrus Vision SF50 five to seven-seat light jet
- Cirrus VK-30 & ST-50 five-seat pusher homebuilt developed into a turboprop
- Cirrus SRS two-seat light-sport aircraft

=== Civilian ===
- Civilian Coupé single-engined two-seat private monoplane

=== COMAC ===
- Comac C909 twin-engined regional jet
- Comac C919 twin-engined narrow-body airliner

=== Command-Aire ===
- Command-Aire 3C3 three-seat open cockpit utility biplane
- Command-Aire 4C3 three-seat open cockpit utility biplane
- Command-Aire 5C3 three-seat open cockpit utility biplane

=== Commercial ===
- Commercial C-1 Sunbeam single-engine biplane airliner and record aircraft

=== Commonwealth (US) ===
- Commonwealth Skyranger two-seat utility monoplane

=== Commonwealth Aircraft Corporation (Australia) ===
- CAC Ceres crop duster developed from Wirraway trainer

=== Comper ===
- Comper Swift single-engine single-seat parasol-wing sports biplane
- Comper Mouse three-seat low-wing cabin monoplane
- Comper Streak single-engined, single-seat low-wing racing monoplane
- Comper Kite single-engined, two-seat touring monoplane

=== Conroy ===
- Conroy Skymonster oversized freighter derived from Canadair CL-44

=== Consolidated ===
- Consolidated Commodore twin-engine flying boat airliner
- Consolidated Fleetster single-engine monoplane airliner
- Consolidated Model 39 Liberator Liner four-engine monoplane airliner
- Consolidated PBY Catalina twin-engine flying boat waterbomber and transport
- Consolidated PB4Y-2 Privateer bomber repurposed as water bomber

=== Convair ===
- Convair 240/340/440 short-haul airliners
- Convair CV-540/580/600/640/5800 short-haul turboprop airliners
- Convair CV-880 four-jet airliner
- Convair CV-990 four-jet airliner

=== Couzinet ===
- Couzinet 70 Arc en Ciel trimotor airliner and mailplane

=== Cranwell ===
- Cranwell CLA.4 1920s single-engined two-seat sesquiplane ultralight

=== Crawford ===
- Crawford CLM all-metal high-wing cabin monoplane

=== C.R.D.A. CANT (Cantieri Aeronautici e Navali Triestini) ===
- CANT 6 trimotor biplane flying boat airliner
- CANT 10 single-engine biplane flying boat airliner
- CANT 18 single-engine flying boat trainer
- CANT 22 trimotor flying boat airliner
- CANT Z.506A trimotor transport floatplane
- CANT Z.509 trimotor floatplane mailplane
- CANT Z.1010 single-engine airliner
- CANT Z.1012 3-passenger trimotor airliner

=== Culver ===
- Culver Dart two-seat sports monoplane
- Culver Cadet two-seat sports monoplane
- Culver Model V two-seat cabin monoplane

=== Cunliffe-Owen ===
- Cunliffe-Owen Concordia twin-engine airliner
- Clyde Clipper twin-engine lifting-body airliner

=== Cunningham-Hall ===
- Cunningham-Hall GA-21M low-wing open-cockpit monoplane
- Cunningham-Hall PT-6 cabin monoplane

=== Curtiss ===
- Curtiss Autoplane roadable airplane
- Curtiss Carrier Pigeon biplane mailplane
- Curtiss Condor 18 twin-engine biplane airliner
- Curtiss Cox Racer monoplane/biplane/triplane racing aircraft
- Curtiss Eagle biplane airliner
- Curtiss F sport biplane flying boat
- Curtiss Falcon biplane mailplane
- Curtiss Fledgling training and sport biplane
- Curtiss HS forestry patrol biplane flying boat
- Curtiss JN-4 "Jenny" two-seat open-cockpit training biplane used for barnstorming
- Curtiss Kingbird twin-engine monoplane airliner
- Curtiss Lark biplane mailplane and bushplane
- Curtiss MF biplane sport flying boat
- Curtiss Night Mail biplane mailplane
- Curtiss Oriole training biplane
- Curtiss Robin three-seat sport/touring monoplane
- Curtiss Thrush five-seat cabin monoplane

=== Curtiss Canada ===
- Curtiss JN-4 (Canadian) "Canuck" two-seat open-cockpit training biplane used for barnstorming

=== Curtiss-Reid ===
- Curtiss-Reid Courier single-seat mailplane and sport monoplane
- Curtiss-Reid Rambler two-seat open sport biplane

=== Curtiss-Wright ===
(absorbed Travel Air)

- Curtiss-Wright CW-1 Junior two-seat sports monoplane
- Curtiss-Wright CW-3 Duckling two-seat amphibious flying boat
- Curtiss CW-4/T-32 Condor II biplane airliner
- Curtiss-Wright CW-6 6-seat cabin utility monoplane
- Curtiss-Wright CW-12 open-cockpit sports biplane
- Curtiss-Wright CW-14 Travel Air/Sportsman Deluxe open-cockpit sports biplane
- Curtiss-Wright CW-19 light cabin transport
- Curtiss CW-20/C-46 Commando twin-engine airliner/freighter

== D ==
=== Dassault ===
- Dassault Falcon 10 & 100 light corporate jet
- Dassault Falcon 20, 30 & 200 corporate jet and utility transport
- Dassault Falcon 2000 transcontinental-range midsize to large corporate jet
- Dassault Falcon 50 long-range midsize corporate jet
- Dassault Falcon 5X midsize corporate jet
- Dassault Falcon 7X long-range corporate jet
- Dassault Falcon 900 long-range corporate jet
- Dassault Mercure narrowbody jet

=== Davis ===
- Davis D-1 light open-cockpit two-seat parasol monoplane

=== de Havilland ===
(see also Airco)

- de Havilland DH.18 biplane airliner
- de Havilland DH.34 biplane airliner
- de Havilland DH.37 touring biplane
- de Havilland DH.50 biplane airliner
- de Havilland DH.53 Humming Bird ultralight monoplane
- de Havilland DH.54 Highclere biplane airliner
- de Havilland DH.60 Moth two-seat sport biplane
- de Havilland DH.61 Giant Moth single-engine biplane airliner
- de Havilland DH.66 Hercules trimotor biplane airliner
- de Havilland DH.71 Tiger Moth racing monoplane
- de Havilland DH.75 Hawk Moth single-engine cabin monoplane
- de Havilland DH.80 Puss Moth three-seat cabin monoplane
- de Havilland DH.82 Tiger Moth two-seat training biplane
- de Havilland DH.83 Fox Moth single-engine cabin biplane airliner
- de Havilland DH.84 Dragon twin-engine biplane airliner
- de Havilland DH.85 Leopard Moth small cabin monoplane
- de Havilland DH.86 Express 4-engine biplane airliner
- de Havilland DH.87 Hornet Moth two-seat cabin biplane
- de Havilland DH.88 Comet two-seat twin-engine racer
- de Havilland DH.89 Dragon Rapide twin-engine biplane airliner
- de Havilland DH.90 Dragonfly twin-engine cabin biplane
- de Havilland DH.91 Albatross four-engine monoplane airliner and mailplane
- de Havilland DH.95 Flamingo twin-engine monoplane airliner
- de Havilland DH.104 Dove twin-engine commuter airliner and executive transport
- de Havilland DH.106 Comet jet airliner
- de Havilland DH.114 Heron four-engine commuter airliner

=== de Havilland Australia ===
- de Havilland Australia DHA-3 Drover trimotor monoplane used for flying doctor service

=== de Havilland Canada ===
- de Havilland Canada DHC-1 Chipmunk two-seat light training and sport aircraft
- de Havilland Canada DHC-2 Beaver single-engine STOL utility transport
- de Havilland Canada DHC-3 Otter single-engine STOL utility transport
- de Havilland Canada DHC-4 Caribou twin-engine STOL utility transport
- de Havilland Canada DHC-5 Buffalo twin-engine STOL utility transport
- de Havilland Canada DHC-6 Twin Otter twin-engine STOL turboprop regional airliner and utility transport
- de Havilland Canada DHC-7 Dash 7 four-engine turboprop STOL regional airliner
- de Havilland Canada DHC-8 Dash 8 twin turboprop regional airliner

=== Dean-Wilson Aviation ===
- Whitney Boomerang two-seat sport/training aircraft

=== Denney ===
- Denney Kitfox two-seat light utility monoplane

=== Deperdussin (Société Pour L'Aviation et ses Dérivés) ===
- Deperdussin 1910 monoplane sport monoplane
- Deperdussin 1912 Racing Monoplane
- Deperdussin Monocoque racing monoplane

=== Desoutter ===
- Desoutter three-seat cabin monoplane air taxi

=== Dewoitine ===
- Dewoitine D.7 single-seat sportsplane
- Dewoitine D.14 single-engine monoplane airliner
- Dewoitine D.30 single-engine monoplane airliner
- Dewoitine D.33 single-engine monoplane distance record aircraft
- Dewoitine D.35 single-engine monoplane airliner
- Dewoitine D.332 trimotor monoplane airliner
- Dewoitine D.338 trimotor monoplane airliner
- Dewoitine D.342 trimotor monoplane airliner
- Dewoitine D.620 trimotor monoplane airliner
- Dewoitine P-2 glider
- Dewoitine P-3 glider
- Dewoitine P-4 glider

=== Diamond ===
- Diamond DA20 Katana two-seat single-engine light aircraft
- Diamond DA40 Diamond Star four-seat, single engine light aircraft
- Diamond DA42 Twin Star twin-engined light aircraft
- Diamond DA50five-seat, single-engine light aircraft
- Diamond DA52 five to seven seat twin-engined light aircraft
- Diamond DA62 five to seven seat twin-engined light aircraft
- Diamond D-Jet five-seat single-engined light jet aircraft
- Diamond HK36 Super Dimona two-seat motorglider

=== Dornier ===
- Dornier Delphin I single-engine transport flying boat
- Dornier Delphin II single-engine transport flying boat
- Dornier Delphin III single-engine transport flying boat
- Dornier Do C III Komet I single-engine parasol monoplane airliner
- Dornier Do Komet II single-engine parasol monoplane airliner
- Dornier Do Komet III single-engine parasol monoplane airliner
- Dornier Do A Libelle single-engine monoplane flying boat
- Dornier Do B Merkur single-engine parasol monoplane airliner
- Dornier Spatz single-engine monoplane landplane derived from Libelle
- Dornier Do R Superwal four-engine parasol monoplane flying boat
- Dornier Do J Wal twin-engine transport flying boat
- Dornier Do K1 & K2 four-engine high-wing monoplane airliner
- Dornier Do K3 four-engine high-wing monoplane airliner
- Dornier Do S four-engine monoplane flying boat
- Dornier Do X twelve-engine monoplane transatlantic flying boat
- Dornier Do 18 twin-engine flying boat mailplane
- Dornier Do 26 four-engine gull-wing monoplane catapult-launched mailplane flying boat
- Dornier Do 27 STOL utility light aircraft
- Dornier Do 28 utility transport
- Dornier Do 128 utility transport
- Dornier 228 turboprop utility aircraft
- Dornier 328 turboprop feederliner
- Dornier 328JET jet powered feederliner

=== Douglas ===
(for later types see McDonnell Douglas)

- Douglas DB-7/A-20 Havoc twin-engine bombers converted into executive aircraft
- Douglas DC-1 twin-engine monoplane airliner
- Douglas DC-2 twin-engine monoplane airliner
- Douglas DST (Sleeper Transport) twin-engine monoplane airliner
- Douglas DC-3 twin-engine monoplane airliner and freighter
- Douglas DC-4E experimental four-engine monoplane airliner and freighter
- Douglas DC-4 four-engine monoplane airliner and freighter
- Douglas DC-5 twin-engine monoplane airliner
- Douglas DC-6 four-engine monoplane airliner and freighter
- Douglas DC-7 four-engine monoplane airliner and freighter
- Douglas DC-8 jet airliner and freighter
- Douglas DC-9 jet airliner
- Douglas DC-10 widebody tri-jet airliner
- Douglas DF commercial twin-engine monoplane flying boat
- Douglas Dolphin executive transport and small airliner
- Douglas M-1, 2, 3 & 4 single-engine biplane mailplanes
- Douglas Sinbad executive transport and small airliner

=== Driggs ===
- Driggs Dart open-cockpit sports biplane
- Driggs Skylark two-seat sport biplane

=== Druine ===
- Druine Turbulent single-seat monoplane ultralight homebuilt
- Druine Turbi two-seat open-cockpit monoplane homebuilt
- Druine Condor two-seat sport/training monoplane

=== Dyle et Bacalan ===
- Dyle et Bacalan DB-70 trimotor lifting-body airliner

== E ==
=== Eagle Aircraft (US) ===
- Eagle Aircraft Eagle

=== Eagle Aircraft (Australia) ===
- Eagle Aircraft Eagle 150

=== Eastman ===
- Eastman E-2 Sea Rover two-three-seat utility flying boat

=== Eclipse Aviation/Aerospace ===
- Eclipse 400 light jet
- Eclipse 500 light jet
- Eclipse 550 & 700 light jets

=== Edge ===
- Edge 540 aerobatic and racing aircraft

=== Edgley ===
- Edgley Optica light aircraft

=== EH Industries ===
- EH Industries EH 101 utility/VIP helicopter

=== English Electric ===
- English Electric Wren single-seat monoplane ultralight

=== Embraer ===
- Embraer EMB 110 Bandeirante turboprop multi-purpose aircraft
- Embraer EMB 120 Brasilia 30-seat turboprop regional airliner
- Embraer EMB 121 Xingu turboprop utility aircraft
- Embraer/FMA CBA 123 Vector turboprop regional airliner
- Embraer ERJ 135 regional jet airliner
- Embraer ERJ 140 regional jet airliner
- Embraer ERJ 145 regional jet airliner
- Embraer 170 medium-range jet airliner
- Embraer 175 medium-range jet airliner
- Embraer 190 medium-range jet airliner
- Embraer 195 medium-range jet airliner
- Embraer Lineage 1000 corporate jet
- Embraer Legacy 450 mid-light corporate jet
- Embraer Legacy 500 mid-size corporate jet
- Embraer Legacy 600 corporate jet
- Embraer Legacy 650 evolution of Legacy 600
- Embraer Phenom 100 light corporate jet
- Embraer Phenom 300 light corporate jet
- Embraer Praetor 500 mid-size corporate jet
- Embraer Praetor 600 mid-size corporate jet

=== Emigh ===
- Emigh A-2 Trojan single-engine two-seat monoplane

=== Enstrom ===
- Enstrom F-28 and 280 light helicopter
- Enstrom TH180 light helicopter
- Enstrom 480 light helicopter

=== ERCO ===
- ERCO Ercoupe two-seat light aircraft

=== Europa ===
- Europa XS two-seat kitplane

=== Eurocopter ===
(see also Aérospatiale)

- Eurocopter Super Puma medium lift utility helicopter
- Eurocopter Ecureuil light utility helicopter
- Eurocopter Ecureuil 2 twin-engined light utility helicopter
- Eurocopter Dauphin 2 & EC-155 twin-engine utility helicopter
- Eurocopter BO 105 & EC Super Five light utility helicopter
- Eurocopter Colibri light utility helicopter
- Eurocopter EC-135/635 twin-turbine utility helicopter
- MBB/Kawasaki BK117 twin-engine utility helicopter

=== Evangel ===
- Evangel 4500 twin-engine utility transport

=== Extra Aircraft ===
- Extra 200 aerobatic aircraft
- Extra 230 aerobatic aircraft
- Extra 300 aerobatic aircraft
- Extra 400 six-seat utility transport
- Extra 500 six-seat utility transport

== F ==
=== Fairchild ===
- Fairchild 21 two-seat sport biplane
- Fairchild 22 two-seat parasol monoplane
- Fairchild 24 Argus single-engine cabin monoplane
- Fairchild 42 single-engine monoplane airliner and transport
- Fairchild 45 single-engine low wing transport
- Fairchild F-46 single-engine low wing transport
- Fairchild 51 single-engine monoplane airliner and transport
- Fairchild 71 single-engine monoplane airliner and transport
- Fairchild 91 single-engine amphibious flying boat
- Fairchild 100 single-engine monoplane airliner and transport
- Fairchild 150 single-engine airliner
- Fairchild FC-2 single-engine monoplane airliner and transport
- Fairchild KR-31 two-seat sport biplane
- Fairchild KR-34 two-seat sport biplane

=== Fairchild Canada ===
- Fairchild Super 71 single-engine utility monoplane
- Fairchild 82 single-engine utility monoplane
- Fairchild 45-80 Sekani twin-engine utility monoplane
- Fairchild F-11 Husky single-engine utility monoplane

=== Fairchild Dornier/Swearingen ===
- Fairchild (Swearingen) Merlin turboprop corporate transport
- Fairchild Dornier 228 regional airliner and utility transport
- Fairchild Dornier 328 regional turboprop airliner
- Fairchild Dornier 328JET & 428JET regional jet airliner
- Fairchild Aerospace SA226 Metro II & SA227 Metro III & 23 regional airliner

=== Farman ===
- Farman F.60 Goliath twin-engine biplane airliner
- Farman F.65 David/Sport ultralight sport biplane
- Farman F.70 single-engine biplane airliner
- Farman F.90 single-engine biplane airliner
- Farman F.120 multi-engine monoplane airliner
- Farman F.161/162/163/169 twin-engine biplane airliner
- Farman F.170 Jabiru single-engine airliner
- Farman F.180 Oiseau Bleu twin-engine airliner
- Farman F.190 single-engine monoplane transport
- Farman F.200 two-seat touring aircraft
- Farman F.200 single-engine utility transport
- Farman F.220/223/224 four-engine mailplane/airliner
- Farman F.230 two-seat trainer/utility/sport monoplane
- Farman F.280 trimotor mailplane
- Farman F.300 trimotor monoplane airliner
- Farman F.310 trimotor monoplane airliner
- Farman F.370 racing monoplane
- Farman F.380 racing monoplane
- Farman F.390 single-engine monoplane transport
- Farman Moustique ultralight sport monoplane

=== FFA ===
- FFA AS-202 Bravo two-seat basic trainer and aerobatic light aircraft

=== Fiat ===
- Fiat AS.1 two-seat touring and sport monoplane
- Fiat G.5 two-seat aerobatic tourer/trainer
- Fiat G.12 trimotor airliner
- Fiat G.18 twin engined airliner
- Fiat G.212 trimotor airliner

=== Fleet ===
- Fleet 50 Freighter twin-engine utility biplane
- Fleet 80 Canuck two-seat utility sport monoplane

=== Fleetwings ===
- Fleetwings Seabird single-engine utility amphibian

=== Focke-Wulf ===
- Focke-Wulf A 16 single-engine cabin monoplane airliner
- Focke-Wulf A 17 Möwe single-engine monoplane airliner
- Focke-Wulf GL 18 twin-engine cabin monoplane airliner
- Focke-Wulf A 32 Bussard single-engine monoplane airliner
- Focke-Wulf A 33 Sperber single-engine monoplane airliner
- Focke-Wulf A 38 Möwe single-engine monoplane airliner
- Focke-Wulf Fw 43 Falke single-engine utility monoplane
- Focke-Wulf Fw 47 Höhengeier single-engine meteorological parasol monoplane
- Focke-Wulf Fw 200 Condor four-engine monoplane airliner

=== Fokker ===
(for US aircraft see Atlantic Aircraft)

- Fokker C.II single-engine biplane transport
- Fokker C.IV single-engine biplane airliner
- Fokker F.II single-engine monoplane airliner
- Fokker F.III single-engine monoplane airliner
- Fokker F.V convertible biplane/monoplane airliner
- Fokker F.VII single-engine and trimotor monoplane airliner/transport
- Fokker F.VIII twin-engine monoplane airliner
- Fokker F.IX trimotor monoplane airliner
- Fokker F.XII trimotor monoplane airliner
- Fokker F.XVIII trimotor monoplane airliner
- Fokker F.XX trimotor airliner
- Fokker F.XXII four-engine high-wing monoplane airliner
- Fokker F.XXXVI four-engine high-wing monoplane airliner
- Fokker F27 Friendship regional airliner
- Fokker F28 Fellowship regional jet airliner
- Fokker 50 turboprop regional airliner
- Fokker 70 regional jetliner
- Fokker 100 regional jetliner

=== Foster, Wikner ===
- Foster Wikner Wicko two-seat cabin monoplane

=== Found Brothers ===
- Found FBA-1 four-seat cabin utility monoplane
- Found FBA-2 five-seat cabin utility monoplane
- Found Centennial 100 five-seat cabin utility monoplane

=== Fournier ===
- Fournier RF-1 two-seat motorglider
- Fournier RF-2 two-seat motorglider
- Fournier RF-3 two-seat motorglider
- Fournier RF-4 single-seat motorglider
- Fournier RF-5 two-seat motorglider
- Fournier RF-6 two-seat low-wing monoplane sport trainer
- Fournier RF-7 single-seat motorglider
- Fournier RF-9 two-seat motorglider
- Fournier RF-10 two-seat motorglider

=== Ford ===
3-AT 1924

- Ford 4-AT Trimotor airliner
- Ford 5-AT Trimotor airliner
- Ford 6-AT Trimotor airliner
- Ford 7-AT Trimotor airliner
- Ford 8-AT Trimotor Freighter freighter
- Ford 9-AT Trimotor airliner
- Ford 11-AT Trimotor airliner
- Ford 14-AT airliner
- Ford Model 15-P two-seat sport monoplane
- Ford Flivver single-seat sport monoplane

=== Four Winds ===
- Four Winds FX-210 four-seat light aircraft

=== Friedrichshafen ===
- Friedrichshafen FF.45 cargo and passenger biplane converted from bomber
- Friedrichshafen FF.49 biplane floatplane used by Lloyd-Luftverkehr

=== Fuji ===
- Fuji FA-200 Aero Subaru four-seat light aircraft
- Fuji FA-300 twin-engine light transport

=== Funk ===
- Funk B two-seat cabin monoplane

== G ==
=== Gasuden ===
- Gasuden KR-2 small single-engine biplane airliner

=== Government Aircraft Factories ===
- GAF Nomad STOL utility transport

=== General Aircraft (UK) ===
- General Aircraft Croydon twin-engine monoplane airliner
- General Aircraft Cygnet single-engine low wing sports monoplane
- General Aircraft Monospar single and twin-engine cabin monoplanes
- General Aircraft Monospar ST-25 twin-engine airliner

=== General Aviation (US) ===
- General Aviation GA-43 single-engine monoplane airliner

=== Giles ===
- Giles G-200 single-seat competition aerobatic aircraft
- Giles G-202 two-seat competition aerobatic aircraft

=== Gippsland Aeronautics/GippsAero ===
- Gippsland GA8 Airvan single-engine high-wing utility aircraft
- Gippsland GA10 Airvan 10 single-engine high-wing utility aircraft
- Gippsland GA-200 Fatman two-seat agricultural aircraft

=== Globe ===
- Globe GC-1 Swift two-seat sports monoplane

=== Gloster ===
- Gloster Gannet single-seat ultralight biplane

=== Granville Brothers ===
- Granville Gee Bee Model A sport biplane
- Granville Gee Bee Sportster (X, B, C, D, E, F) racing monoplanes
- Granville Gee Bee Model Y Senior Sportster racing monoplane
- Granville Gee Bee Model Z Super Sportster racing monoplane
- Granville Gee Bee Model R Super Sportster racing monoplane
- Granville Gee Bee R-6 Q.E.D. racing monoplane

=== Great Lakes ===
- Great Lakes Sport Trainer two-seat biplane

=== Grob ===
- Grob G 109 two-seat motorglider
- Grob G 115 two-seat basic and aerobatic trainer
- Grob GF 200 four-seat light aircraft
- Grob G180 SPn twin-engined corporate jet

=== Grumman ===
- Grumman American AA-1 two-seat light aircraft
- Grumman American AA-5 Traveler, Tiger & Cheetah Four-seat light aircraft
- Grumman G-21 Goose twin-engine utility amphibian
- Grumman G-44 Widgeon twin-engine utility amphibian
- Grumman G-63 Kitten cabin sport utility monoplane
- Grumman G-65 Tadpole amphibious lightplane
- Grumman G-73 Mallard amphibious feederliner
- Grumman G-159 Gulfstream I corporate transport and regional airliner
- Grumman G-164 Ag-Cat biplane agricultural aircraft
- Grumman G-1159 Gulfstream II long-range corporate jet

=== Gulfstream ===
- Gulfstream III long-range business jet
- Gulfstream American GA-7 Cougar four-place light twin
- Gulfstream Aerospace Gulfstream IV long-range business jet
- Gulfstream Aerospace Gulfstream V long-range business jet
- Gulfstream Aerospace Jetprop & Turbo Commander twin turboprop utility transports
- Gulfstream G100 small twin-engine business jet
- Gulfstream G150 small business jet
- Gulfstream G200 twin-engine mid-size business jet
- Gulfstream G280 twin-engine mid-size business jet
- Gulfstream G500 long-range business jet
- Gulfstream G550 long-range business jet
- Gulfstream G650 long-range business jet

== H ==
=== Hamburger Flugzeugbau ===
- Hamburger Flugzeugbau HFB-320 Hansa Jet twin-engine business jet

=== Handley Page ===
- Handley Page Type Otwin-engine airliners derived from bomber
- Handley Page Type W twin-engine and trimotor biplane airliners
- Handley Page H.P.42 four-engine biplane airliner
- Handley Page Halton transport derived from bomber
- Handley Page Hamlet twin-engine or trimotor airliner
- Handley Page Herald turboprop airliner and freighter
- Handley Page Hermes 4-engine airliner
- Handley Page Jetstream regional turboprop airliner
- Handley Page Marathon four-engine airliner

=== Harbin ===
- Harbin Y-11 commuter airliner/utility transport
- Harbin Y-12 commuter airliner/utility transport

=== Harmon ===
- Harmon Mister America

=== Hawker Beechcraft ===
- Beechcraft Baron
- Beechcraft Bonanza
- Beechcraft King Air
- Beechcraft Super King Air
- Beechcraft 1900
- Beechcraft Premier I
- Hawker 200
- Hawker 400XP
- Hawker 750
- Hawker 850XP
- Hawker 900XP
- Hawker 1000
- Hawker 4000

=== Hawker Siddeley ===
- Hawker Siddeley H.S.125 corporate jet
- Hawker Siddeley HS.141 V/STOL design proposal.
- Hawker Siddeley HS 748 (a.k.a. Avro 748)
- Hawker Siddeley Trident short/medium-range airliner

=== Heath ===
- Heath Parasol single-seat homebuilt parasol-wing ultralight

=== Heinkel ===
- Heinkel HE 12 single-engine catapult-launched mailplane fitted with floats
- Heinkel HD 39 single-engine newspaper delivery biplane
- Heinkel HD 40 single-engine newspaper delivery biplane
- Heinkel He 58 single-engine catapult-launched mailplane fitted with floats
- Heinkel He 64 single-engine two-seat touring monoplane
- Heinkel He 70 single-engine airliner and mailplane
- Heinkel He 111 twin-engine monoplane airliner and mailplane
- Heinkel He 116 four-engine long-range mailplane

=== Helio ===
- Helio Courier STOL utility aircraft

=== Hess ===
- Hess Blue Bird mailplane and utility transport

=== Heston ===
- Heston Phoenix single-engine passenger monoplane
- Napier-Heston Racer racing monoplane

=== Hiller ===
- Hiller Model 360 light utility helicopter

=== Hindustan ===
- HAL Dhruv utility helicopter

=== Hitachi ===
- Hitachi TR.1 and 2 twin-engine monoplane airliner

=== Hollsmidt ===
- Hollsmidt 222 twin-engine two-seat cabin homebuilt

=== Honda ===
- Honda HA-420 HondaJet corporate jet

=== Howard ===
- Howard 500 VIP twin-engine propeller aircraft

=== Howard ===
- Howard DGA-3 racing monoplane
- Howard DGA-4 racing monoplane
- Howard DGA-5 racing monoplane
- Howard DGA-6 single-engine cabin racing monoplane
- Howard DGA-8, 9, 11 & 12 single-engine cabin utility monoplane
- Howard DGA-15 single-engine cabin utility monoplane

=== Hughes ===
- Hughes H-1 Racer racing monoplane

=== Hurel-Dubois ===
- Hurel-Dubois HD.31, 32 & 34 twin-engine airliners

== I ==
=== IAI ===
- IAI Arava STOL utility transport
- IAI Westwind corporate jet
- IAI Astra corporate jet
- IAI Galaxy corporate transport

=== IAR ===
- IAR-821 monoplane cropduster
- IAR-822 monoplane cropduster
- IAR 826 monoplane cropduster
- IAR-827 monoplane cropduster
- IAR 823 two-seat cabin training monoplane
- IAR-824 six-seat utility transport
- IAR-46 two-seat training monoplane

=== ICAR ===
- ICAR 36 single-engine monoplane airliner

=== Ilyushin ===
- Ilyushin Il-12 twin-engine airliner and utility transport
- Ilyushin Il-14 twin-engine airliner and utility transport
- Ilyushin Il-18 turboprop airliner
- Ilyushin Il-62 medium capacity airliner
- Ilyushin Il-76 airliner
- Ilyushin Il-86 widebody airliner
- Ilyushin Il-96 widebody airliner
- Ilyushin Il-103 light aircraft
- Ilyushin Il-114 turboprop regional airliner

=== Indonesian Aerospace ===
- CN-235 civil turboprop airliner
- Indonesian Aerospace N-2130 planned commercial jet aircraft
- IPTN N-250/RAI R-80 turboprop regional airliner
- N-219 turboprop regional airliner
- NC-212 civil turboprop airliner

=== Iniziative Industriali Italiane (3I) ===
- 3I Sky Arrow

=== Interstate ===
- Interstate Cadet light sportsplane

=== Ireland ===
- Ireland Comet three-seat open biplane
- Ireland Neptune four-five seat amphibious biplane flying boat
- Ireland Privateer two-seat monoplane sports flying boat

=== Irkut ===
- Irkut MC-21 twin-jet airliner

=== Ishikawajima ===
- Ishikawajima R-3 open-cockpit sports biplane

== J ==
=== Jabiru ===
- Jabiru J120 light aircraft
- Jabiru J160 light aircraft
- Jabiru J170 light aircraft
- Jabiru J230 four-seat light sport
- Jabiru J430 light aircraft
- Jabiru J400/430/450 four-seat kitplane

=== Johnson ===
- Johnson Rocket 185 low wing cabin monoplane

=== Junkers ===
- Junkers A 20 single-engine mailplane
- Junkers A 35 single-engine mailplane
- Junkers A50 two-seat single-engine sportsplane
- Junkers K 16 single-engine cabin monoplane airliner
- Junkers F.13 single-engine monoplane airliner
- Junkers W.33 single-engine monoplane transport
- Junkers W.34 single-engine monoplane transport
- Junkers G.24 trimotor monoplane airliner
- Junkers G.31 trimotor monoplane airliner
- Junkers G.38 four-engine airliner
- Junkers Ju 46 single-engine mailplane
- Junkers Ju 52 trimotor transport/airliner
- Junkers Ju 60 single-engine airliner
- Junkers Ju 86 twin-engine airliner
- Junkers Ju 90 four-engine airliner
- Junkers Ju 160 single-engine airliner

== K ==
=== Kalinin ===
- Kalinin K-2 single-engine monoplane airliner
- Kalinin K-3 single-engine monoplane air ambulance
- Kalinin K-4 single-engine monoplane airliner
- Kalinin K-5 single-engine monoplane airliner

=== Kaman Aircraft ===
- Kaman K-1200 K-Max flying crane and utility helicopter

=== Kamov ===
- Kamov Ka-15 small utility helicopter
- Kamov Ka-18 small utility helicopter
- Kamov Ka-26, 126 and Ka-226 utility/training helicopters
- Kamov Ka-32 utility helicopter
- Kamov Ka-115 utility helicopter

=== Kari-Keen ===
- Kari-Keen 90 Sioux Coupe single-engine cabin monoplane

=== Kharkiv KhAI-1 ===
- Kharkiv KhAI-1 single-engine monoplane airliner

=== Kawanishi ===
- Kawanishi K-1 biplane mailplane
- Kawanishi K-2 racing monoplane
- Kawanishi K-3 biplane airliner and mailplane
- Kawanishi K-6 biplane floatplane airliner
- Kawanishi K-7 biplane floatplane airliner and mailplane
- Kawanishi K-8 monoplane floatplane mailplane
- Kawanishi K-10 airliner and mailplane

=== Kawasaki ===
- Kawasaki KAL-2 4-5 seat single-engine sports monoplane
- Kawasaki KDC-2/C-2 passenger floatplane
- Kawasaki KDC-5/C-5 high-speed mailplane

=== Kellett ===
- Kellett K-2, 3 & 4 two-seat autogyros
- Kellett KD-1 two-seat utility autogyro

=== Kestrel ===
- Kestrel KL-1 single-engined four-seat utility
- Kestrel K250 single-engined four-seat utility

=== Keystone ===
- Keystone K-55 Pronto single-engine three-seat biplane mailplane
- Keystone K-47 Pathfinder trimotor biplane cabin airliner
- Keystone K-78 Patrician trimotor monoplane cabin airliner

=== Keystone-Loening ===
- Keystone-Loening K-84 Commuter single-engine amphibious biplane airliner
- Keystone-Loening K-85 Air Yacht single-engine amphibious biplane airliner

=== Kharkov ===
- Kharkov KhAI-1 single-engine monoplane airliner

=== Kinner ===
- Kinner Airster two-seat single-engined biplane
- Kinner Envoy four-seat cabin monoplane
- Kinner Playboy two-seat sporting monoplane
- Kinner Sportster single-seat low-wing monoplane
- Kinner Sportwing two-seat sporting monoplane

=== Klemm ===
- Klemm Kl 25 two-seat single-engine sports monoplane
- Klemm Kl 26/27/28/30 two-seat single-engine sports monoplane
- Klemm Kl 31 four-seat touring monoplane
- Klemm Kl 32 enclosed three-seat single-engine touring monoplane
- Klemm Kl 35 open-cockpit two-seat single-engine sports monoplane
- Klemm Kl 36 four-seat touring monoplane
- Klemm Kl 105 two-seat cabin touring monoplane
- Klemm Kl 107 two-seat cabin touring monoplane

=== Koolhoven ===
- Koolhoven F.K.30 single-seat monoplane ultralight
- Koolhoven F.K.33 monoplane trimotor airliner
- Koolhoven F.K.40 single engine airliner
- Koolhoven F.K.43 four-seat single-engined monoplane air taxi
- Koolhoven F.K.44 open-cockpit parasol sports monoplane
- Koolhoven F.K.45 aerobatics biplane
- Koolhoven F.K.48 twin-engine monoplane airliner
- Koolhoven F.K.50 twin-engine monoplane airliner
- Koolhoven F.K.53 Junior two-seat sports monoplane
- Koolhoven F.K.54 three-seat cabin touring monoplane
- Koolhoven F.K.57 twin-engine executive transport

=== Kreider-Reisner ===
- Kreider-Reisner C-2 Challenger sporting biplane
- Kreider-Reisner C-4 Challenger sporting biplane
- Kreider-Reisner C-6 Challenger sporting biplane

=== Kreutzer ===
- Kreutzer Air Coach monoplane trimotor airliner

== L ==
=== Laird ===
- Laird LC-B three-seat commercial biplane
- Laird LC-R Speedwing three-seat commercial biplane
- Laird LC-EW six-seat high wing cabin monoplane
- Laird Solution racing biplane
- Laird Super Solution racing biplane
- Laird-Turner Meteor LTR-14 racing monoplane

=== Lake ===
- Lake LA4, Buccaneer amphibious light aircraft
- Lake Renegade, Renegade & Turbo Renegade amphibious light aircraft

=== Lancair ===
- Lancair ES
- Lancair IV
- Lancair Evolution
- Lancair Columbia four-seat light aircraft
- Lancair 320 two-seat light monoplane
- Lancair Legacy two-seat light monoplane

=== Lasco ===
- Lasco Lascoter single-engine monoplane airliner and mailplane

=== Latécoère ===
- Latécoère 15 twin-engine monoplane airliner
- Latécoère 17 single-engine airliner
- Latécoère 25 single-engine monoplane mailplane and airliner
- Latécoère 26 single-engine monoplane mailplane
- Latécoère 28 single-engine monoplane mailplane and airliner
- Latécoère 300 twin-engine mailplane flying boat
- Latécoère 350 trimotor monoplane mailplane and airliner
- Latécoère 380 twin-engine mailplane flying boat
- Latécoère 631 six-engine transatlantic flying boat

=== Laville ===
- Laville PS-89 twin-engine monoplane airliner

=== Learjet ===
- Learjet 23, 24, 25, 28 and 29 corporate jets
- Learjet 31 corporate jet
- Learjet 35 and 36 corporate jets

=== Let Kunovice ===
- Let L-40 MetaSokol three/four-seat light aircraft
- Let L-410 & L-420 turboprop regional airliners
- Let L-610 turboprop regional airliners
- Let L-200 Morava twin-engine light twin

=== Letov Kbely ===
- Letov Š-18 two-seat open-cockpit training biplane
- Letov Š-19 single-engine airliner
- Letov Š-32 monoplane trimotor airliner
- Letov Š-39 two-seat open-cockpit parasol monoplane sportsplane

=== Lincoln-Page ===
- Lincoln-Page LP-2 three-seat sport biplane
- Lincoln-Page LS-2 Sport racing biplane
- Lincoln-Page PT open-cockpit two-seat biplane trainer

=== Lioré et Olivier ===
- Lioré et Olivier LeO 21 twin-engine biplane airliner
- Lioré et Olivier LeO H-190 single-engine biplane flying boat airliner
- Lioré et Olivier LeO H-242 four-engine monoplane flying boat airliner
- Lioré et Olivier LeO H-246 four-engine monoplane flying boat airliner

=== Lisunov ===
- Lisunov PS-84/Li-2 airliner (development of licence-built Douglas DC-3)

=== Lockheed ===
- Lockheed Vega single-engine monoplane airliner
- Lockheed Air Express single-engine monoplane airliner
- Lockheed Model 8 Sirius single-engine monoplane airliner
- Lockheed Model 8D Altair sportsplane
- Lockheed Model 9 Orion single-engine monoplane airliner
- Lockheed Model 10 Electra twin-engine monoplane airliner
- Lockheed Model 12 Electra Junior twin-engine monoplane airliner
- Lockheed Model 14 Super Electra twin-engine monoplane airliner
- Lockheed Model 18 Lodestar twin-engine monoplane airliner
- Lockheed Ventura twin-engine bomber rebuilt as executive transport
- Lockheed P-2 Neptune patrol bomber repurposed as water bomber
- Lockheed P-3 Orion patrol bomber repurposed as water bomber
- Lockheed Saturn twin-engine feederliner
- Lockheed JetStar large corporate jet
- Lockheed 049/
- 649/
- 749 Constellation/
- L-1049 Super Constellation long-range piston-engine airliner
- Lockheed L-1649 Starliner final Constellation model
- Lockheed L-100 Hercules turboprop freighter
- Lockheed L-188 Electra turboprop airliner and freighter
- Lockheed L-1011 TriStar trijet widebody airliner

=== Lockspeiser ===
- Lockspeiser LDA-01 tandem-wing experimental utility transport

=== Lockwood ===
- Lockwood Aircam two-seat twin-engine utility kit-built airplane

=== Loening ===
- Loening S-1 Flying Yacht single-engine open-cockpit monoplane airliner
- Loening C-2 Air Yacht single-engine amphibious cabin airliner

=== Luscombe ===
- Luscombe Phantom two-seat monoplane
- Luscombe 4 two-seat monoplane
- Luscombe 8 Silvaire two-seat monoplane
- Luscombe 10 single-seat sport monoplane
- Luscombe 11 Sedan four-seat monoplane

=== Luton Aircraft ===
- Luton Buzzard single-seat open-cockpit low-wing monoplane ultralight
- Luton Major two-seat cabin monoplane
- Luton Minor single-seat high-wing ultra-light

=== L.V.G. ===
- LVG C.V passenger and mail biplane converted from observation aircraft
- LVG C.VI passenger and mail biplane converted from observation aircraft

== M ==
=== Macchi ===
(for later types see Aermacchi)

- Macchi M.3 single engine flying boat used as an airliner
- Macchi M.16 single-seat sport biplane
- Macchi M.C.73 open-cockpit sports biplane
- Macchi M.C.94 twin-engine monoplane flying boat airliner
- Macchi M.C.100 trimotor monoplane flying boat airliner
- Macchi M.B.308 two-seat sport utility aircraft
- Macchi M.B.320 twin-engine cabin monoplane

=== Malmö ===
- Malmö MFI-9 two-seat light sport monoplane

=== Mansyu/Manshu ===
- Manshū Hayabusa single-engine monoplane airliner

=== Margański & Mysłowski ===
- Swift S-1 two-seat competition sailplane
- MDM MDM-1 Fox two-seat competition sailplane
- MDM Solo Fox single-seat competition sailplane
- Margański & Mysłowski EM-11 Orka single-engine pusher utility aircraft

=== Martin ===
- Martin M-130 "China Clipper" long-range flying boat airliner
- Martin M-156/PS-30 long-range flying boat airliner
- Martin JRM Mars four-engine flying-boat water bomber
- Martin 2-0-2 twin piston-engine regional airliner
- Martin 3-0-3 twin piston-engine regional airliner
- Martin 4-0-4 twin piston-engine regional airliner

=== Martin-Baker ===
- Martin-Baker MB 1 two-seat low-wing cabin monoplane

=== Maule ===
- Maule M-4 to M-7 4–5-seat STOL light aircraft

=== McDonnell Douglas ===
(for earlier types see Douglas)

- McDonnell Douglas DC-9 airliner
- McDonnell Douglas DC-10 widebody trijet airliner
- McDonnell Douglas MD-11 widebody trijet airliner
- McDonnell Douglas MD-80/MD-81/82/83/87/88 medium-range airliner
- McDonnell Douglas MD-90 medium-range airliner

=== MD Helicopters ===
- MD Helicopters MD 500 light utility helicopter
- MD Helicopters MD 600 utility helicopter
- MD Helicopters MD 900 Explorer light twin helicopter

=== MDM ===
- MDM-1 Fox two-seat aerobatic glider

=== Messerschmitt ===
(for earlier designs see BFW)

- Messerschmitt Bf 108 sports monoplane

=== Messerschmitt-Bölkow-Blohm ===
(for earlier designs see Bölkow)

- MBB Bo 105 and Bo 106 light utility helicopter
- MBB Bo 209 Monsun two-seat utility monoplane
- MBB 223 Flamingo training and aerobatic monoplane
- MBB/Kawasaki BK 117 utility helicopter

=== Meyers ===
- Meyers OTW-125, OTW-145 and OTW-160 two-seat training biplane
- Meyers MAC-125 and MAC-145 two-seat cabin monoplane
- Meyers 200 four-seat cabin monoplane

=== Mil ===
- Mil Mi-1 light utility helicopter
- Mil Mi-2 utility helicopter
- Mil Mi-4 utility helicopter
- Mil Mi-6 heavy lift helicopter
- Mil Mi-8 utility helicopter
- Mil Mi-10 flying crane helicopter
- Mil Mi-17 utility helicopter
- Mil Mi-26 heavy lift utility helicopter
- Mil Mi-34 light utility helicopter
- Mil Mi-38 utility helicopter
- Mil V-12 heavy lift helicopter

=== Miles ===
- Southern Martlet single-engined single-seat biplane sports aircraft
- Miles Satyr single-seat aerobatic biplane
- Miles Hawk open-cockpit two-seat light monoplane
- Miles Hawk Major open-cockpit two-seat light monoplane
- Miles Falcon three/four-seat cabin monoplane
- Miles Merlin five-seat cabin monoplane
- Miles Sparrowhawk single-seat racing and touring monoplane
- Miles Peregrine twin-engined monoplane airliner
- Miles Whitney Straight two-seat cabin monoplane
- Miles Mohawk tandem two-seat enclosed monoplane
- Miles Hobby single-engine single-seat low-wing racing monoplane
- Miles Monarch three-seat cabin touring monoplane
- Miles Mercury four-seat single-engined touring and training monoplane
- Miles Messenger four-seat single-engine cabin monoplane
- Miles Aerovan twin-engined short-range low-cost utility transport
- Miles Gemini twin-engine four-seat touring monoplane
- Miles M.68 twin-engine containerized freighter
- Miles Merchantman four-engine utility transport
- Miles Sparrowjet single-seat twin-jet racer

=== Millicer ===
- Millicer M10 AirTourer Two-seat aerobatic capable light aircraft

=== Mitsubishi ===
- Mitsubishi MU-2 twin turboprop utility transport
- Mitsubishi MU-300 Diamond twin-engine jet corporate aircraft
- Mitsubishi MH2000 airliner helicopter
- Mitsubishi Regional Jet/SpaceJet (MRJ) short to medium-range airliner

=== Mohawk ===
- Mohawk M-1-C Pinto, Redskin and Spurwing two-seat sporting monoplanes
- Mohawk M-2-C Chieftain twin-engine monoplane transport

=== Monocoupe ===
- Monocoupe Model 22 two-seat sports monoplane
- Monocoupe 70 two-seat sports monoplane
- Monocoupe 90 two-seat sports monoplane
- Monocoupe 110 and 110 Special two-seat sports and racing cabin monoplane

=== Mooney ===
- Mooney M10 Cadet two-seat sport monoplane
- Mooney M18 Mite single-seat sport monoplane
- Mooney M20 four-seat light aircraft
- Mooney M22 Mustang five-seat single-engine airliner
- Mooney 301 six-seat single-engine monoplane

=== Morane-Saulnier ===
(see also SOCATA)

- Morane-Saulnier G two-seat racing monoplane
- Morane-Saulnier H single-seat racing monoplane
- Morane-Saulnier AI aerobatic and sports monoplane
- Morane-Saulnier MS.180 two-seat open-cockpit aerobatic monoplane
- Morane-Saulnier MS.230 two-seat open-cockpit aerobatic monoplane
- Morane-Saulnier MS.341 two-seat open-cockpit aerobatic monoplane
- Morane-Saulnier MS.560 single-seat aerobatic monoplane
- Morane-Saulnier MS-700 Pétrel four-seat cabin-monoplane
- Morane-Saulnier MS.760 Paris four-seat executive jet
- Morane-Saulnier MS-880 Rallye two-four-seat light aircraft

=== Morrisey/Shinn/Varga ===
- Morrisey 2150/Shinn 2150A/Varga 2150 Kachina tandem two-seat low-wing monoplane

=== Moss Brothers ===
- Moss M.A.1 tandem two-seat low-winged sporting monoplane
- Moss M.A.2 side by side two-seat low-winged sporting monoplane

=== Murphy Aircraft ===
- Murphy Elite three-seat kitplane STOL utility monoplane
- Murphy JDM-8 Single-seat low wing homebuilt ultralight
- Murphy Maverick high-wing ultralight
- Murphy Moose STOL utility monoplane
- Murphy Rebel three-seat kitplane STOL utility monoplane
- Murphy Renegade sports biplane
- Murphy Super Rebel high-wing utility transport
- Murphy Yukon high-wing utility transport

== See also ==
- List of aircraft
- List of most-produced aircraft
- List of ICAO aircraft type designators
- List of airliners by maximum takeoff weight
- List of Bushplanes
- List of light transport aircraft
- List of racing aircraft
- List of regional airliners
