= S45 =

S45 may refer to:

== Aviation ==
- Blériot-SPAD S.45, a French biplane airliner
- SABCA S-45bis, a Belgian bomber
- Short S.45, a British biplane trainer
- Short S.45 Seaford, a British flying boat
- Sikorsky S-45, a proposed American flying boat
- Siletz Bay State Airport, in Lincoln County, Oregon, United States

== Rail and transit ==
- S45 (Berlin), an S-Bahn line in Germany
- S45 (Long Island bus), United States
- S45 (Vienna), an S-Bahn line in Austria

== Other uses ==
- Canon PowerShot S45, a digital camera
- Explorer S-45 (satellite), a failed American spacecraft
- S45: In case of accident or if you feel unwell seek medical advice immediately (show the label where possible), a safety phrase
- INS Shankush (S45), a submarine of the Indian Navy
- Siemens S45, a mobile phone
- Sulfur-45, an isotope of sulfur
- USS S-45 (SS-156), a submarine of the United States Navy
- S45, a postcode district in Chesterfield, England
- Saviem S45, a Savien bus model

== See also ==
- 45S (disambiguation)
