= List of civil aircraft =

For lists of civil aircraft, see:

- List of civil aircraft (A–M)
- List of civil aircraft (N–Z)
