= 45s =

45s or 45S may refer to:

- Silver Lake Forest Service Strip (FAA identifier: 45S), an airport in Lake County, Oregon, U.S.
- Forty-fives, a trick-taking card game
- 45s: 45 rpm 7" vinyl single records spun at forty-five revolutions per minute (rpm or RPM); some Gramophone records also spun at 45 rpm.
- The Forty-Fives, a rock band formed in Atlanta, GA in 1998
- FourFiveSeconds, a song by Rihanna, Kanye West and Paul McCartney
- Soldiers in the Jacobite army of the Jacobite rising of 1745
- Sulfur-45 (^{45}S), an isotope of sulfur

== See also ==
- S45 (disambiguation)
