= Blériot 73 =

French WW1 bomber aircraft

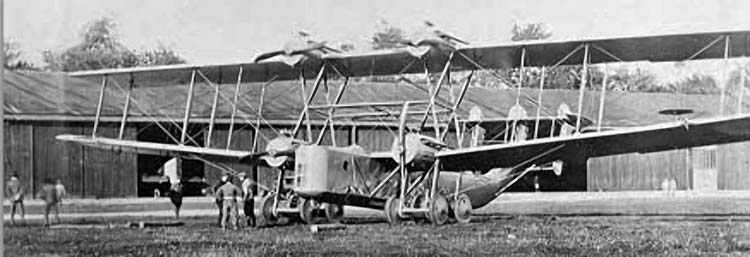

General information
- Type: Night bomber
- National origin: France
- Manufacturer: Blériot
- Designer: Touillet
- Primary user: None
- Number built: 3 (one each of 73, 74 and 75)

History
- Manufactured: 1918 to 1920
- First flight: July 1918
- Developed from: Blériot 71
- Developed into: Blériot 115

The Blériot Bl.73, Bl.74, Bl.75 and Bl.76 were large First World War French biplanes designed and built by Blériot. The Bl.73 was built to the BN.3 three-seat night bomber specification, the Bl.74 was to be a bomber-transport, the Bl.75 Aerobus was to be an airliner, while the unbuilt Bl.76 was intended for the BN.4 four-seat night bomber specification. Aside from the Bl.76, just one prototype was built of each type, with both Bl.73 and Bl.74 prototypes being lost in accidents while on test flights.

== Design and development ==
=== Blériot Bl.73 ===
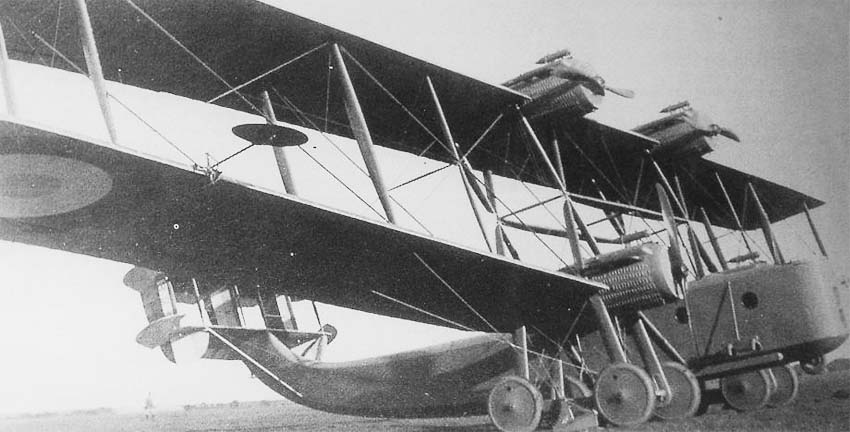
Blériot Bl.73 BN.3

The Blériot Bl.73 BN.3 was a large equal-span biplane bearing a family resemblance to the slightly smaller Blériot Bl.71, with the exception of the location and shape of the fuselage. The lower wing had considerable dihedral and was attached to the top of the fuselage, while the rear fuselage was curved strongly upwards to a biplane tail unit with twin rudders. Four 300 hp (220 kW) Hispano-Suiza 8Fb water-cooled V-8 engines were used, with two on the upper wing leading edge and two on the lower wing leading edge, directly over each other. The outer wing panels had two wing bays, with the inner bay split with half struts, as on the SPAD fighters. The landing gear consisted of two bogeys, one on each side of the fuselage, with each bogey having four wheels arranged in a rectangle, so that no tailskid was needed. During flight testing on 22 January 1919 the sole Bl.73 crashed on landing at the end of its first flight, killing the pilot.

=== Blériot Bl.74 ===
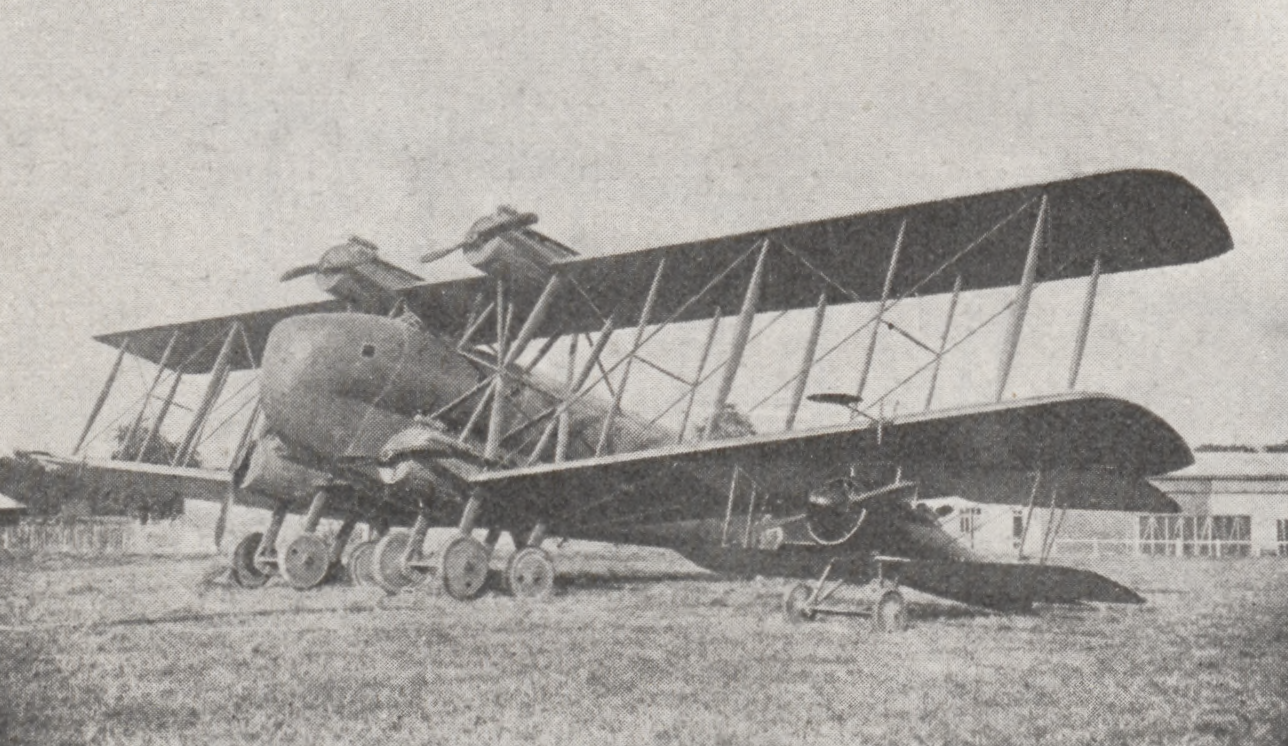
Blériot Bl.74 bomber with SPAD XV fighter. The Bl.75 was similar.

After the crash of the Blériot Bl.73, Touillet developed a heavy bomber/airliner with a large double bubble teardrop fuselage mounted on the lower wing. The engines remained the same as those of the Bl.73 although the wings were enlarged slightly, and rigged so that both outer bays were split with half struts, although the upswept tail was dispensed with. Flight testing at Villacoubly was abruptly ended on 22 January 1920 when oscillations in the tail unit caused a structural failure which resulted in the fatal crash of the sole prototype.

=== Blériot Bl.75 Aerobus ===
The airliner version had a longer rear fuselage and enlarged vertical tail surface but was otherwise similar to the Bl.74. Despite the promising flight-tests of the sole Blériot Bl.75, no orders ensued.

=== Blériot Bl.76 ===
Designed for the wartime BN.4 specification, and a beneficiary of the merger between Blériot and SPAD, the Blériot Bl.76 BN.4 bomber more closely resembled a four-engine Blériot-SPAD S.45 repurposed as a bomber than prior designs. Both upper and lower wings were swept-back and rigged with I struts in a single bay outboard of the engines, with the upper 300 hp (220 kW) Hispano-Suiza 8Fb engines mounted further inboard than the lower engines. Positions for gunners were provided in the extreme nose, and on top of the fuselage just behind the wing. A conventional tail with a single fin and rudder was planned, along with a pair of large but conventional main wheels braced to the fuselage and engine, with a tail skid. It remained a design study only, and was not built. The 1921 S.45 differed primarily having the fuselage double bubble reduced in height, straight lower wings, having just two engines mounted on the lower wings without their own wing bay, a more complex undercarriage, and in lacking a gunner's position in the nose.

== Specifications (Blériot Bl.73) ==
Data from Aviafrance: Bleriot Bl-73, French aircraft of the First World War

General characteristics

- Crew: 3
- Length: 14.5 m (47 ft 7 in)
- Wingspan: 28 m (91 ft 10 in)
- Height: 6.15 m (20 ft 2 in)
- Wing area: 148 m^{2} (1,590 sq ft)
- Empty weight: 3,230 kg (7,121 lb)
- Gross weight: 6,980 kg (15,388 lb)
- Powerplant: 4 × Hispano-Suiza 8Fb V-8 water-cooled piston engine, 220 kW (300 hp) each
- Propellers: 2-bladed wooden fixed-pitch propellers

Performance

- Maximum speed: 130 km/h (81 mph, 70 kn) at sea level
- Endurance: 6 hours 40 minutes

Armament

- Guns: 2 x 7.7 mm (0.303 in) machine-guns, one on a flexible mount in the rear gunner's cockpit and one on a flexible mount in the nose gunner's cockpit.
- Bombs: 1,000 kg (2,200 lb) of bombs
