= Blériot 71 =

French WW1 bomber aircraft

Blériot Bl.71 BN.3
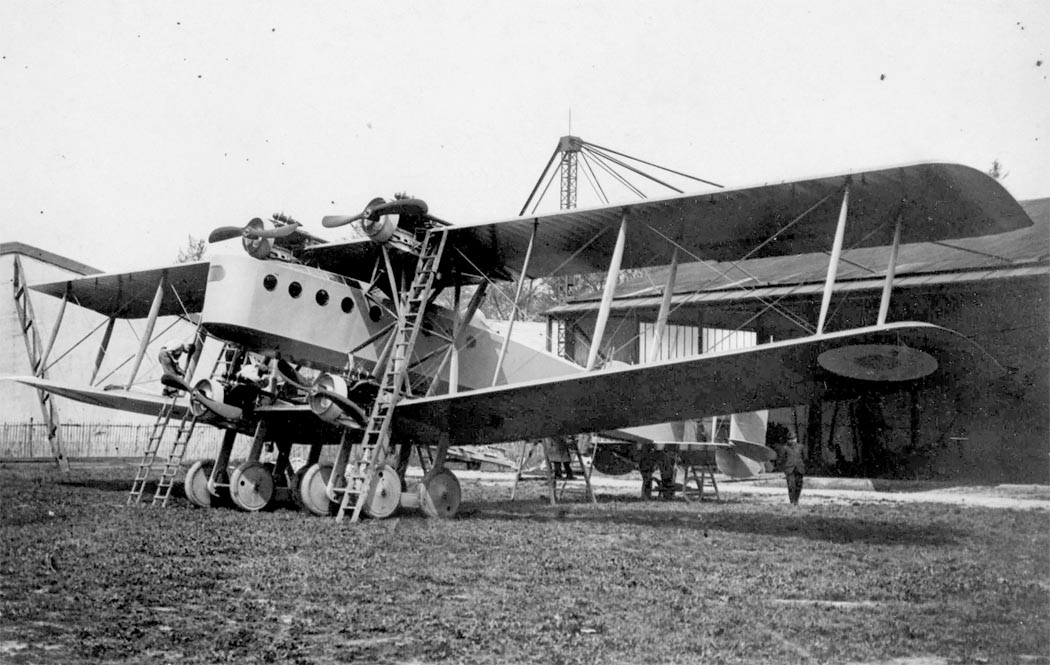

General information
- Type: Night bomber
- National origin: France
- Manufacturer: Blériot
- Designer: Touillet
- Status: abandoned
- Number built: 1

History
- First flight: 18 September 1916
- Developed from: Blériot 67
- Developed into: Blériot 73

The Blériot Bl.71 BN.3 was a large First World War French heavy biplane night bomber designed and built by Blériot to the BN.3 three-seat night bomber specification. Only a single prototype was built, which was damaged beyond repair on 15 May 1918.

== Design and development ==
The Blériot Bl.71 was a large equal-span biplane with a fuselage braced between the two wings and bearing a strong resemblance to the Bl.67, (originally designed with the fuselage attached to the lower mainplane). Four 160 kW (220 hp) Hispano-Suiza 8B water-cooled V-8 engines were mounted above each other on each side of the fuselage, two on the upper wing leading edge and two on the lower wing. The biplane tail unit was originally designed with three fins, but eventually built with just two and the fixed conventional landing gear had four-wheel main units on struts and a tailskid. During flight testing the Bl.71 collided with a Breguet Br.14 B.2 at Villacoublay on 15 May 1918, ending up in a ditch, damaged beyond repair.

== Specifications ==
Data from Aviafrance: Bleriot Bl-71, French aircraft of the First World War

General characteristics

- Crew: 3
- Length: 14 m (45 ft 11 in)
- Wingspan: 26.3 m (86 ft 3 in)
- Height: 6 m (19 ft 8 in)
- Wing area: 140 m^{2} (1,500 sq ft)
- Empty weight: 3,200 kg (7,055 lb)
- Gross weight: 6,530 kg (14,396 lb)
- Powerplant: 4 × Hispano-Suiza 8B V-8 water-cooled piston engine, 160 kW (220 hp) each
- Propellers: 2-bladed fixed-pitch wood propellers

Performance

- Maximum speed: 140 km/h (87 mph, 76 kn) at sea level
