= Aéro Club du Bas Armagnac =

Aéro Club du Bas Armagnac (ACBA) is a large French aero club based in Nogaro, Armagnac. It offers a range of activities including pilot training and light aircraft hire. The club is noteworthy for having manufactured a glider tug of its own design, the ACBA Midour. Activities offered include gliding, aircraft, helicopter, and Autogyro.
