= Blériot 67 =

French WW1 bomber aircraft

Blériot Bl.67 B.3
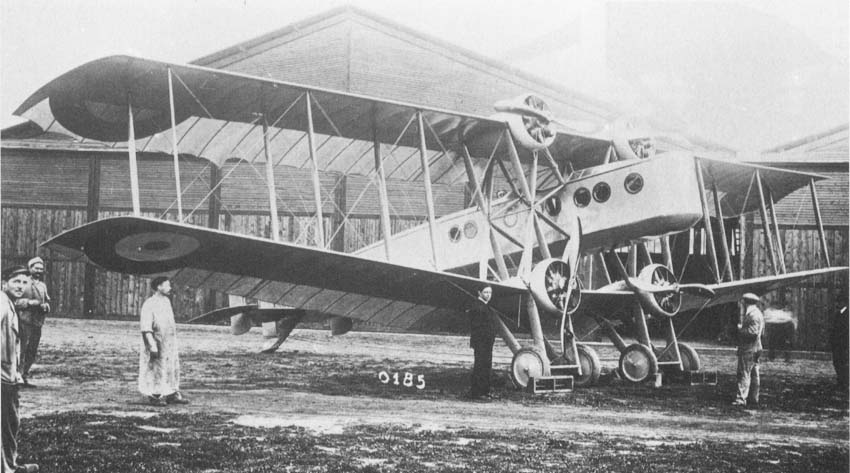

General information
- Type: Heavy bomber
- National origin: France
- Manufacturer: Blériot
- Number built: 1

History
- First flight: 18 September 1916
- Developed into: Blériot 71

The Blériot Bl.67 B.3 was a First World War French biplane heavy bomber designed and built by Blériot for a 1916 competition Concours des Avions Puissants. Only a single prototype was built.

The Blériot Bl.67 was a large equal-span biplane with a fuselage braced between the two wings, the four 75 kW (100 hp) Gnome 9B rotary engines above each other, with two on the upper wing leading edge and two on the lower wing on each side of the fuselage.. It had a biplane tail with three fins and a fixed conventional landing gear with twin-wheel main units. It was first flown on 18 September 1916 but crashed on landing and was destroyed.

== Specifications ==
Data from

General characteristics

- Crew: 3
- Length: 11.80 m (38 ft 9 in)
- Wingspan: 19.60 m (64 ft 4 in)
- Wing area: 89.00 m^{2} (958.0 sq ft)
- Empty weight: 1,800 kg (3,968 lb)
- Gross weight: 3,500 kg (7,716 lb)
- Powerplant: 4 × Gnome Monosoupape 9 Type B-2 9-cyl. air-cooled rotary piston engine, 75 kW (100 hp) each
- Propellers: 2-bladed fixed-pitch wood propellers

Performance
