= Farman F.200 (1923) =

General information
- Type: Touring aircraft
- National origin: France
- Manufacturer: Avions Farman
- Number built: 1

History
- First flight: April or May 1923

The unsuccessful French Farman F.200 of 1923 shared its type name with the 1929 Farman F.200, the progenitor of a series of parasol wing tourers. It was a two-seat touring aircraft, with a low, thick, cantilever wing. Only one was built and only briefly tested.

== Design and development ==
Farman had previously designed and built monoplanes like the Farman Moustique, but this had an externally wire braced wing. The all wood F.200 was their first attempt to make an internally braced, cantilever monoplane. It had a very thick wing, about 600 mm (24 in) deep at the root, which with a thickness/chord ratio of 16% resulted in a broad root chord of 3.75 m (12 ft 4 in). This provided a wing area high enough to support the F.200's considerable (1,120 kg (2,470 lb)) loaded weight within an achievable span.

The wing panels, which could be rapidly detached for storage from a narrow wing centre section integrated into the fuselage, were built around two box spars and were strictly trapezoidal in plan, tapering in chord down to 1.50 m (4 ft 11 in) at the tips; they were also strongly tapered in thickness.

Its weight required a powerful engine and the F.200 had a 130 kW (180 hp) water-cooled Hispano-Suiza 8Ab V-8, mounted over the wing leading edge. Its radiator was in the nose between the engine and propeller, only just ahead of the wing and its fuel tank was in the wing centre-section. Behind the engine the fuselage had a rectangular section with an enclosed cabin containing two seats in tandem over the wing. The cabin roof line merged into a fairing which reached back to the triangular vertical tail, its fin carrying an unbalanced rudder that went down to the keel. The horizontal tail, mounted on the top of the fuselage, was rectangular in plan; its unbalanced elevators had a cut-out for the rudder.

The F.200's fixed landing gear was conventional, with a track of 3.0 m (120 in). Each mainwheel was on a cranked axle from the corners of the fuselage, with a rubber shock absorber at the apex of a vertical V-strut from the wing spars. There was a small tailskid.

The Farman F.200 was on display, unflown, on the Farman stand in the 1922 Paris Salon, where its unusual appearance attracted attention, but it rapidly disappeared from the French contemporary journals. There are two accounts of its development, one contemporary and one from the late 20th century, which strongly conflict. Les Ailes, writing in early April 1923 states briefly that tests showed it to be very manoeuvrable and fast, with a maximum speed of 200 km/h (120 mph; 110 kn). In J. Liron's 1984 account it was not flown until May and then as a single-seater since in earlier tests it was unable to take-off with two aboard; worse, the May tests showed it to be totally uncontrollable as the thick wing root, close to the propeller, blanked the tail from the slipstream and prop wash. Liron does not say if the lack of control was at take-off or in flight.

== Specification ==
Data from Les Ailes, April 1923; Performance Liron (1984)

General characteristics

- Crew: one pilot
- Capacity: one passenger
- Length: 9.50 m (31 ft 2 in)
- Wingspan: 10.80 m (35 ft 5 in)
- Height: 2.30 m (7 ft 7 in)
- Wing area: 28 m^{2} (300 sq ft)
- Aspect ratio: 4.2
- Empty weight: 680 kg (1,499 lb)
- Gross weight: 1,120 kg (2,469 lb)
- Fuel capacity: 280 kg (620 lb) fuel and oil
- Powerplant: 1 × Hispano-Suiza 8Ab water-cooled V-8, 130 kW (180 hp)
- Propellers: 2-bladed, 2.60 m (8 ft 6 in) diameter

Performance

- Maximum speed: 185 km/h (115 mph, 100 kn)
- Range: 400 km (250 mi, 220 nmi)
- Service ceiling: 3,200 m (10,500 ft)
- Wing loading: 40 kg/m^{2} (8.2 lb/sq ft)
- Landing speed: 70 km/h (43 mph)

== Bibliography ==
- Liron, Jean (1984). Les avions Farman. Collection Docavia. Vol. 21. Paris: Éditions Larivière. OCLC 37146471.
