= Alcor Duo =

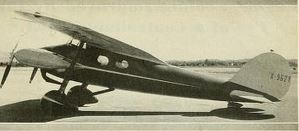
- Duo-6

General information
- Type: four-six passenger aircraft
- National origin: United States
- Manufacturer: Alhambra Airport & Air Transport Co.
- Designer: Allan H. Lockheed

History
- First flight: 18 March 1931

The Alcor Duo-4 was a high wing cabin aircraft, unusually powered by a pair of four cylinder straight engines mounted horizontally either side of the nose. After an accident it was rebuilt with six cylinder engines, becoming the Alcor Duo-6. The name Alcor derived from Allan Lockheed Corporation.

== Design and development ==
Apart from their engine cowlings the Duo-4 and the rebuilt Duo-6 had identical structures. They had ply-covered cantilever high wings which tapered outwards both in plan and thickness, built around two box spars. Their ailerons were inset.

Both were powered by air-cooled Menasco engines within carefully streamlined cowlings. The Menascos were mounted horizontally, head to head, on the nose of the fuselage so their propeller shafts were much closer together than on most conventional twin-engined aircraft, producing handling generally nearer to that of a single-engined design. On the Duo-4 the tips of the two-bladed propellers could be as little as 3 in (76 mm) apart. The Duo-4 had 125 hp (93 kW) Menasco C-4 and the Duo-6 215 hp (160 kW), supercharged Menasco C-6S engines.

The rectangular cross-section, ply-covered fuselage had a Cr/Mo structure. On the Duo-6 pilot and co-pilot sat side by side in an enclosed cockpit under the wing leading edge and the passenger cabin behind them, with two windows on each side, could be configured to hold four or six seats. Two separate baggage compartments provided a combined volume of 40 cu ft (1.1 m^{3}). Entry was via a port side door. There is less detail about the lower-powered Duo-4 but it is recorded as a five place aircraft.

The fuselage tapered to a conventional tail of rounded profile and plan. Like the wing the tail had wooden structure and ply covering. Its tailplane, mounted at mid-fuselage, was in-flight adjustable for trim.

The Duos had conventional, fixed, split axle landing gear with axles and drag struts mounted on the fuselage centreline. On each side a long, near-vertical leg, equipped with a hydraulic shock absorber, joined the outer end of the axle to the forward spar. The wheels, fitted with brakes, were enclosed under spats.

The first flight of the Duo-4 was in 1930, piloted by Frank Clarke, though there is some uncertainty about the Menasco sub-type used. By 18 March 1931 Menasco C-4s were fitted when it was flown from Muroc Dry Lake by E.L. Remelin. Later that month it was damaged by a wind gust and, though damage was slight, funding problems slowed the rebuild. Lockheed used the three year delay to fit C-6S engines which almost doubled the engine power. The first flight of the Duo-6 was in March 1934, piloted by Frank Clarke at Alhambra airport.

Soon after, test flights were made with one propeller removed. The Duo-6 took off from an extended run, climbed at 400 ft/min (2.0 m/s) then performed a series of right- and left-handed wingovers, handling much like a single-engined aircraft despite the power asymmetry.

In October 1934 U.S. regulations limited commercial use of single-engined passenger aircraft, offering the Duo-6 a market opportunity but it was damaged again in 1935 and Alcor concentrated on a new, low wing design with a similar engine layout, the Alcor C-6-1 Junior.

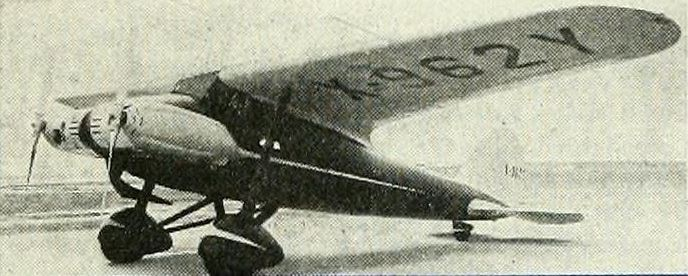

== Specifications (Duo-6) ==
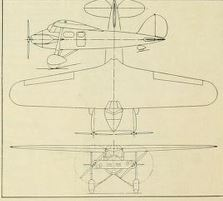

Data from Aero Digest (April 1935)

General characteristics

- Crew: two
- Capacity: four or six passengers
- Length: 28 ft 5 in (8.66 m)
- Wingspan: 42 ft (13 m)
- Height: 9 ft 6 in (2.90 m)
- Wing area: 282 sq ft (26.2 m^{2})
- Airfoil: M-6
- Empty weight: 2,885 lb (1,309 kg)
- Payload: 1,300 lb (590 kg)
- Gross weight: 5,090 lb (2,309 kg)
- Fuel capacity: 110 US gal (92 imp gal; 420 L)
- Powerplant: 2 × Menasco C-6S air-cooled, supercharged straight six engines, mounted horizontally, 210 hp (160 kW) each
- Propellers: 2-bladed Lycoming-Smith variable pitch

Performance

- Maximum speed: 190 mph (310 km/h, 170 kn)
- Cruise speed: 160 mph (260 km/h, 140 kn)
- Landing speed: 57 mph (92 km/h; 50 kn)
- Range: 660 mi (1,060 km, 570 nmi)
- Service ceiling: 18,500 ft (5,600 m) service
- Rate of climb: 1,400 ft/min (7.1 m/s)
