= ACBA Midour =

French glider tug aircraft

Midour
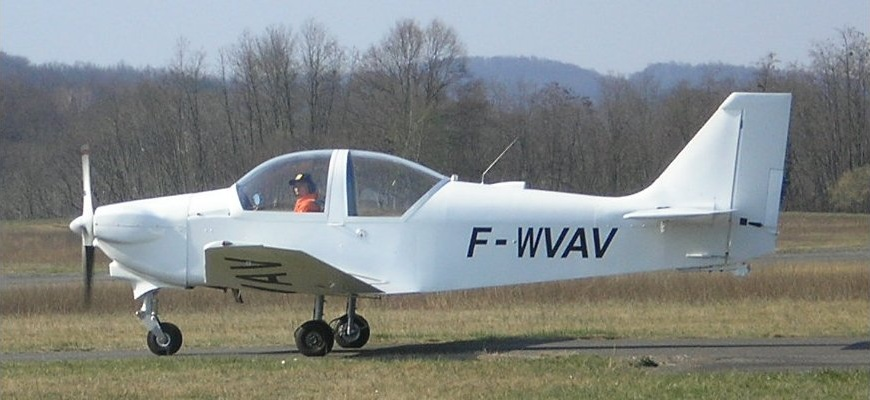
- ACBA-7 Midour

General information
- Type: Glider tug
- Manufacturer: Aéro Club du Bas Armagnac
- Primary user: Aéro Club du Bas Armagnac
- Number built: 7

History
- First flight: 1993
- Developed from: Robin DR400

The ACBA Midour, Midour 2 and Midour 3 are a series of glider tugs manufactured by the Aéro Club du Bas Armagnac in France, and named after the Midou River.

== Design and development ==
The Midour is a double-seat, low-wing monoplane of conventional configuration, fitted with a fixed, tricycle undercarriage. Developed in the workshop of the ACBA using the wings of a Robin DR400, the Midour first flew in 1993 and four additional examples to the original design have been built, along with two modified versions.

Although the Midour is sometimes equipped with only a single seat, a passenger can be carried behind the pilot, to assist in the release of gliders being towed.

== Variants ==
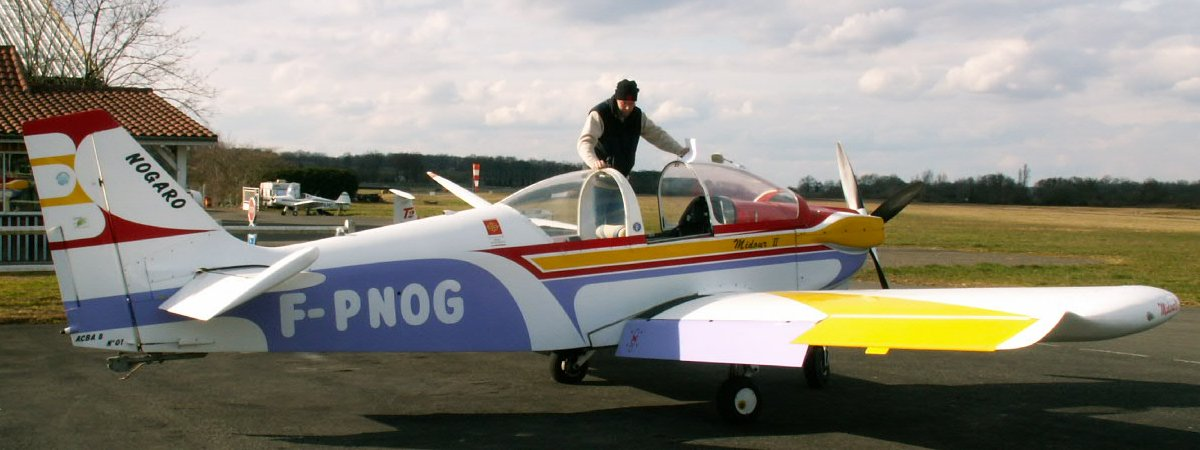
ACBA-8 Midour 2.

ACBA-7 Midour
Original version with 180 horsepower (130 kW) Lycoming O-360 engine; five built.

ACBA-8 Midour 2
Improved version with entirely new wing design. One built.

ACBA-10 Midour 3
Optimised, quieted version of Midour 2 with new fuselage and canopy, designed to be especially quiet due to noise pollution concerns. One built.

== Specifications (ACBA-7) ==
Data from

General characteristics

- Crew: 1
- Capacity: 1 passenger (optional)
- Length: 6.81 m (22 ft 4 in)
- Wingspan: 8.72 m (28 ft 7 in)
- Wing area: 14.2 m^{2} (153 sq ft)
- Aspect ratio: 5.35
- Empty weight: 550 kg (1,213 lb)
- Max takeoff weight: 790 kg (1,742 lb)
- Powerplant: 1 × Lycoming O-360 4-cyl. horizontally-opposed piston engine, 130 kW (180 hp)

Performance

- Maximum speed: 300 km/h (190 mph, 160 kn)
- Cruise speed: 190 km/h (120 mph, 100 kn)
- Rate of climb: 3.72 m/s (732 ft/min)

== Operator ==
The Midour was built by and for the Aéro Club du Bas Armagnac, an aero club based at the Nogaro aerodrome in the Gers department of southwestern France. The club offers gliding alongside powered flying, helicopter and autogyro activities, including discovery flights and a full-day gliding introduction, which depend on tugs to launch the gliders. The type was the subject of a feature in the French magazine Aviasport in 2021, whose title calls it a "Stakhanovite of the air".

== See also ==
Related development

- Robin DR400

Aircraft of comparable role, configuration, and era

- Aero L-60 Brigadýr
- PZL-104 Wilga
