= Curtiss-Reid Courier =

General information
- Type: Mail plane
- National origin: Canada
- Manufacturer: Curtiss-Reid
- Designer: R.N. Bell
- Number built: 1

History
- First flight: Mid-January 1932

The Curtiss-Reid Courier was designed in Canada in 1931 as a specialist, non-passenger carrying, mailplane capable of maintaining services in Canada's hard winters. The 1930s depression led to the end of government subsidised airmail contracts and only one prototype flew. It was lost in 1933 during preparations for a private, long distance flight.

== Design ==
The Reid Aircraft co. was established in February 1928 by W.T. Reid in Montreal but purchased by the Curtiss Aeroplane and Motor Company in December 1928. The renamed Curtiss-Reid Aircraft Company remained in Montreal. In early 1931 all government airmail contracts were threatened with cancellation because of the worsening economic conditions but J.A.D. McCurdy, the head of Curtiss-Reid hoped that a specialised mailplane, economical and able to fly in Canada's harsh winters, might find approval.

The Courier (Courrier in French) was a parasol wing aircraft. Its wing was in three parts: two outer panels, straight-edged in plan with constant chord and square tips, swept at 4° and with about 4° of dihedral, and a small trapezoidal centre-section of shorter chord. This latter was a metal structure which also served as a fuel tank. The outer panels were each built around two wooden spars and duralumin ribs. Like the rest of the Courier, the wings were fabric covered. Its Frise type ailerons were balanced both statically and aerodynamically.

The wing was braced to the lower fuselage on each side with V-struts to the spars and the central-section joined to the upper fuselage on steel cabane struts. The outer panels folded back along the fuselage for storage or transport on outward leaning rear hinges which placed the trailing edge of the folded wing above that of the centre-section. Short, telescopic struts supported the wings during the folding process.

The Courier was powered by a 120 hp (89 kW) de Havilland Gipsy III, a four-cylinder air-cooled inverted inline engine, driving a two-bladed propeller. Its oil-cooler was placed under the engine where, in winter, engine heat could keep the oil fluid. The Courier's fuselage was roughly quadrilateral in section and built on welded steel tube Warren girder frames, though the upper decking was rounded. Mail was contained within a 16 cu ft (0.45 m^{3}) compartment immediately behind the engine with a weight limit of 250 lb (110 kg). An open but heated cockpit was placed aft of the trailing edge, the pilot's upward vision enhanced by the short chord centre-section. At the rear, tailplane and elevators, nearly rectangular in plan, were mounted on top of the fuselage. The Courier could be trimmed by adjusting the angle of incidence of the tailplane. The fin and rudder were tall and rounded; the latter extended down to the keel and worked in a cut-out between the elevators.

The Courier had split-axle, tailskid landing gear with its bent axles articulated from a small pyramid of steel tubes from the fuselage underside centre-line and with drag struts back to the centre-line. Another, longitudinal, tube from the drag struts' meeting point braced the pyramid. Long-travel oleo struts to the upper fuselage, medium pressure tyres and a track of 6 ft (1.8 m) assisted landings on rough ground. The wheels were enclosed in fairings and equipped with brakes. Its tailskid, which protruded from the extreme fuselage tail, also had an oleo shock absorber. The Courier could also be flown as a floatplane after replacing the main gear with a pair of Edo single-stepped floats.

== Operational history ==
The Courier was flown for the first time in mid-January 1932 from Cartierville by Pete Vachon. An attempt to interest Canadian Airways, the biggest airmail carrier, failed and Curtiss-Reid had to abandon hopes of production. Efforts to interest the Royal Canadian Air Force also failed, though the sole prototype was flown to Ottawa where official air force performance tests were conducted. For unknown reasons, their speeds were about 10% slower than the manufacturer's.

Though the Courier handled well, as demonstrated on a long flight to Charlottetown on Prince Edward Island as part of the Maritime Air Tour, the depressed economy made it hard to sell to clubs or individuals. In February 1933 it was sold to a private owner for a long distance flight. Fairchild fitted it with extra tanks for fuel and oil, increasing fuel capacity by factor of 5.5 and loaded weight by 52%. Fairchild's chief pilot, Bernard Martin had been hired to test fly the modified Courier but on his second flight on 17 June 1933 it spun in on landing approach, killing Martin and destroying the aircraft.

== Specifications ==
Manufacturer's figures. Their speeds were higher than those determined in RCAF tests.

Data from Molson and Taylor

General characteristics

- Length: 21 ft 1.5 in (6.439 m)
- Wingspan: 30 ft 0 in (9.14 m)
- Height: 7 ft 4 in (2.24 m)
- Wing area: 144.6 sq ft (13.43 m^{2})
- Empty weight: 1,080 lb (490 kg)
- Gross weight: 1,752 lb (795 kg)
- Fuel capacity: 30 imp gal (36 US gal; 140 L)
- Powerplant: 1 × de Havilland Gipsy III 4-cylinder air-cooled inverted inline, 120 hp (89 kW) at 2,300 rpm
- Propellers: 2-bladed

Performance

- Maximum speed: 137 mph (220 km/h, 119 kn) . RCAF: 124 mph (200 km/h; 108 kn)
- Cruise speed: 118 mph (190 km/h, 103 kn) at 2,000 rpm. RCAF: 105 mph (169 km/h; 91 kn)
- Range: 550 mi (890 km, 480 nmi)
- Service ceiling: 15,000 ft (4,600 m)
- Rate of climb: 820 ft/min (4.2 m/s) with full load
- Wing loading: 12.1 lb/sq ft (59 kg/m^{2})
