= Hess Blue Bird =

1920s American civil transport aircraft

Blue Bird

General information
- Type: Light commercial aircraft
- National origin: USA
- Manufacturer: Hess Aircraft Co.
- Number built: c.19

History
- First flight: 1926

The Hess H-2 Blue Bird was a small US transport biplane, built in the 1920s and carrying two or four passengers according to engine power.

== Design and development ==
The Blue Bird was one of many US 1920s small passenger or mail aircraft offered with a range of readily available World War I engines. The earliest example appeared in mid-1925, with the type description H-1 and named the Wyandotte after its home town. A three-seater powered a 90 hp (67 kW) Curtiss OX-5 V-8, it was used to refine the design into the H-2 production machine. This flew near the end of the year.

The H-2 was a single bay biplane with wings of unequal span and quadrilateral plans out to rounded tips. The upper wing, mounted without dihedral, had the greater span so the steel N-form interplane struts leaned both forward and outwards; there was 12 in (300 mm) of stagger. The lower wing had 3° of dihedral. The wings were built around two spruce and mahogany-plywood spars and plywood box ribs. The leading edges were aluminium-skinned with fabric covering elsewhere. The upper wing, held over the fuselage on a cabane, had metal-framed ailerons on both upper and lower wings, externally interconnected.

Its OX-5 engine was closely cowled around the two cylinder banks and was gravity fed from a 30 US gal (25 imp gal; 110 L) fuel tank in the upper wing centre section. The fabric-covered fuselage structure of the H-2 was a square section, welded steel tube girder. Stressed regions used molybdenum steel. The metal frame included a rounded rear decking, some cockpit detail and the engine mounting, built from on square section steel tubes and designed to be easily adaptable to different engines. There were two open cockpits. Passengers sat side-by-side in the forward one, with access made easier by a drop-down fuselage panel, and the pilot had the rear. The tail unit was conventional, with the tailplane mounted on top of the fuselage and wire-braced to a cropped triangular profile fin. The fixed surfaces were mahogany-ply covered over spruce frames but its control surfaces had light-metal frames.

The fixed landing gear was also conventional, with wheels on split axles mounted below the fuselage centre-line, their outer ends on telescopic shock absorber legs and trailing drag struts from the lower longerons. Both were enclosed in balsa-fairings. Its metal tube tailskid was rubber-sprung.

From the start the engines mountings had been designed to accept other engines, specifically either the Wright-Martin E, a 180 hp (130 kW) Hispano-Suiza 8 or lower-powered members of the Wright Whirlwind family of radial engines. The Hispano, like the Curtiss, was a water-cooled V-8 and both had been produced in large numbers during World War I so war surplus examples were readily available at low cost. The Whirlwind, in contrast, was a post-war engine and much more expensive. A 1927 advert prices the Blue Bell at $2250 (Curtiss), $2900 (Hispano) but $7000 (Whirlwind). The greater power of the Hispano allowed the forward cockpit to be enlarged to 42 cu ft (1,200 L), enough to hold four passengers on two bench seats facing one another. This version appeared early in 1926. The only Whirlwind-powered Blue Bird, fitted with a (a 220 hp (160 kW) Wright J-5C) and named Miss Wanda, was not built for passenger transport but for a long distance flight.

== Operational history ==
The histories of only a few of the approximately 18 production Blue Birds are known. A Hispano-engined example took part in the annual Ford National Reliability Air Tour, held in August 1926. In 1927 an H-2, engine unknown, took part in the National Air Tour. Miss Wanda, specifically constructed for the Dole transpacific race and flown by Frederik Giles, had not only the Whirlwind engine but a deepened mid-fuselage containing 500 US gal (420 imp gal; 1,900 L) fuel tanks in place of the passenger cockpit . He missed the start of the race and did not leave San Francisco on his 12,000 mi (19,000 km; 10,000 nmi) journey to Auckland until 10 November but had to turn his overweight aircraft back after 45 minutes because of fog. A second attempt 12 days later also failed early into the flight.

== Specifications (OX-5 engine) ==
Data from Aviation Week, 1927

General characteristics

- Crew: one
- Capacity: two passengers
- Length: 23 ft 6 in (7.16 m)
- Upper wingspan: 33 ft 4 in (10.16 m)
- Lower wingspan: 30 ft 6 in (9.30 m)
- Height: 9 ft 2 in (2.79 m)
- Wing area: 300 sq ft (28 m^{2}) total
- Airfoil: Clark Y
- Empty weight: 1,275 lb (578 kg)
- Gross weight: 2,050 lb (930 kg)
- Fuel capacity: 30 US gal (25 imp gal; 110 L)
- Powerplant: 1 × Curtiss OX-5 water cooled V-8, 90 hp (67 kW)
- Propellers: 2-bladed

Performance

- Maximum speed: 95 mph (153 km/h, 83 kn)
- Stall speed: 42 mph (68 km/h, 36 kn) minimum flying speed
- Range: 340 mi (550 km, 300 nmi)
- Service ceiling: 13,000 ft (4,000 m)
- Rate of climb: 400 ft/min (2.0 m/s) initial
