= Alcor C-6-1 Junior =

C-6-1 Junior

General information
- Type: six passenger airliner
- National origin: United States
- Manufacturer: Alcor Aircraft Co.
- Designer: Allan Lockheed
- Status: destroyed June 27, 1938
- Number built: 1

History
- First flight: March 6, 1938

The Alcor Junior was a small, six passenger, twin-engined airliner built in the U.S. and flown in 1938. As on Alcor's earlier Duo-4 and Duo-6, its inline engines were mounted horizontally to minimize their separation and drag. Only one was built; it was lost in a crash less than four months after its first flight.

== Design and development ==
The C-6-1 was a low wing airliner of mixed wood and metal construction. Its wings were tapered in plan, ending in semi-elliptical tips, and were built around twin spars. Its ribs were steel tube girder structures in inner, high stress regions around engine and undercarriage attachment points but were spruce girders elsewhere. Wing covering was largely plywood, except close to fuel tanks where duralumin was used. The trailing edges carried hydraulically operated flaps and Frise ailerons.

Though in the high wing Duo-4 and -6 the engines were mounted on the sides of the forward fuselage, the low wing of the C-6-1 enabled their attachment, cylinder heads together, to the forward wing spars, with steel trusses distributing loads to the rear spars. Their cowlings formed a local, inner extension of the leading edges. The engines were 250 hp (190 kW), air-cooled, supercharged, straight-six Menasco C-6S Super-Buccaneers. Their positioning brought the propeller tips to within 18 in (460 mm).

The forward fuselage, which included the engine and wing mountings, had a steel tube frame and was skinned with light alloy. Behind the cockpit the fuselage became a semi-monocoque wooden structure, with spruce frames and longerons under pressure-formed two-ply shell. The cockpit had seating for two with dual controls and the passenger cabin behind had three rows of seats in pairs either side of a central aisle. At the rear of the cabin there was a toilet and a baggage compartment with a radio cabin behind it.

The C-6-1 had a conventional cantilever tail formed from plywood over wood frames. The horizontal tail, mounted on the top of the fuselage, was narrow and straight-edged but the vertical tail was much broader and curved, its dorsal fin rising slowly from the fuselage. Control surfaces were balanced and fitted with trim tabs.

Its main landing gear was retractable, with oleo legs retracting rearwards and rotating axially through 90° so the wheels, equipped with brakes, lay flat in the wings. The faired, oleo-legged tailwheel did not retract but lockably swivelled for ground manoeuvres.

The first flight of the C-6-1 was made on March 6, 1938 and a brief development program showed good handling. However, during a test flight on June 27, 1938 the pilot initiated a high speed dive, not part of the flight program, from which he could not recover. The two crew escaped by parachute over San Francisco Bay, but the financial consequences ended Alcor Aircraft.

== Specifications ==
Data from Jane's All the World's Aircraft 1938

General characteristics

- Crew: two
- Capacity: six passengers
- Length: 31 ft 8 in (9.65 m)
- Wingspan: 49 ft (15 m)
- Height: 9 ft (2.7 m)
- Wing area: 318 sq ft (29.5 m^{2}) including ailerons
- Empty weight: 4,141 lb (1,878 kg)
- Gross weight: 6,200 lb (2,812 kg)
- Fuel capacity: 150 US gal (120 imp gal; 570 L)
- Powerplant: 2 × Menasco C-6S Super-Buccaneer air-cooled straight six cylinder, 250 hp (190 kW) each at 5,000 ft (1,500 m)
- Propellers: 2-bladed Hamilton Standard constant speed

Performance

- Maximum speed: 211 mph (340 km/h, 183 kn) at 500 ft (150 m)
- Cruise speed: 190 mph (310 km/h, 170 kn) at 5,500 ft (1,700 m), 75% power
- Range: 738 mi (1,188 km, 641 nmi)
- Rate of climb: 1,350 ft/min (6.9 m/s) at sea level
