= Farman F.200 =

Utility aircraft

F.200
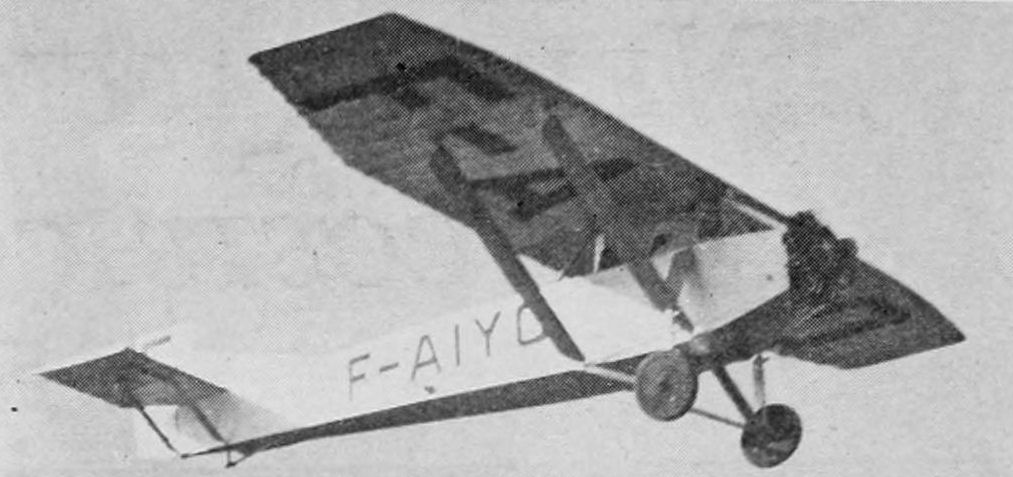

General information
- Type: Utility aircraft
- Manufacturer: Farman

History
- First flight: 1929

The Farman F.200 was a civil utility aircraft produced in France in the 1930s. Derived from the F.190, it featured a revised fuselage that did away with its predecessor's enclosed cabin. Instead, it was a parasol-wing monoplane with open cockpits in tandem for the pilot and one or two passengers. Intended primarily as a trainer, it was also marketed as being suitable as a photographic platform or a mail plane.

== Variants ==
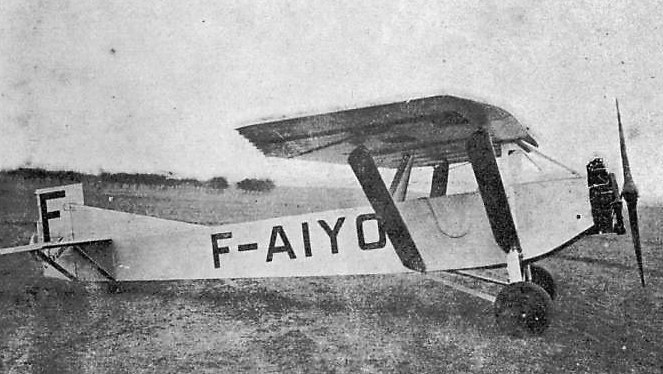
Farman F.200 photo from Annuaire de L'Aéronautique 1931

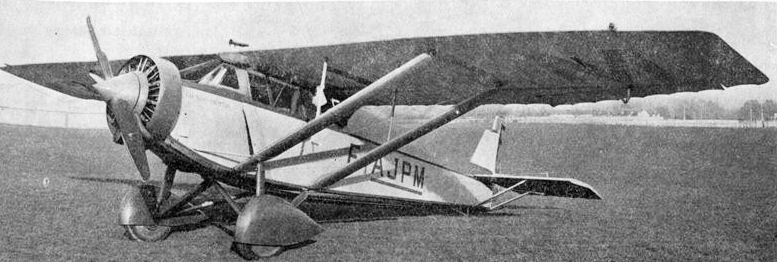
Farman F.206 photo from L'Aerophile May 1932

F.200 (1923)
An unrelated earlier use of the designation for a small two-seat touring aircraft.
F.200
version with 89 kW (120 hp) Salmson 9Ac engine.
F.201
version with 75 kW (100 hp) Hispano-Suiza 6Pa engine.
F.202
version with 89 kW (120 hp) Salmson 9Ac engine.
F.203
version with 89 kW (120 hp) Lorraine 5Pc engine.
F.204
version with 82 kW (110 hp) Lorraine 5Pb engine.
F.205
version with 75 kW (100 hp) Hispano-Suiza 6Pa engine.
F.206
similar to F.202, but with an enclosed cabin, powered with a 89 kW (120 hp) Salmson 9Ac engine.

== Specifications (F.200) ==
Data from Aviafrance F.200

General characteristics

- Crew: One pilot
- Capacity: 1 passenger
- Length: 8.20 m (26 ft 11 in)
- Wingspan: 11.00 m (36 ft 1 in)
- Height: 2.48 m (8 ft 2 in)
- Wing area: 25.4 m^{2} (273 sq ft)
- Empty weight: 617 kg (1,360 lb)
- Gross weight: 980 kg (2,160 lb)
- Powerplant: 1 × Salmson 9Ac , 90 kW (120 hp)

Performance

- Maximum speed: 170 km/h (105 mph, 91 kn)
- Range: 400 km (250 mi, 220 nmi)
- Service ceiling: 3,100 m (10,170 ft)

== Bibliography ==
- Liron, Jean (1984). Les avions Farman. Collection Docavia. Vol. 21. Paris: Éditions Larivière. OCLC 37146471.
- Taylor, Michael J. H. (1989). Jane's Encyclopedia of Aviation. London: Studio Editions. p. 379. ISBN 0-7106-0710-5.
