= Blériot-SPAD S.45 =

1920s French airliner

Blériot-Spad S.45
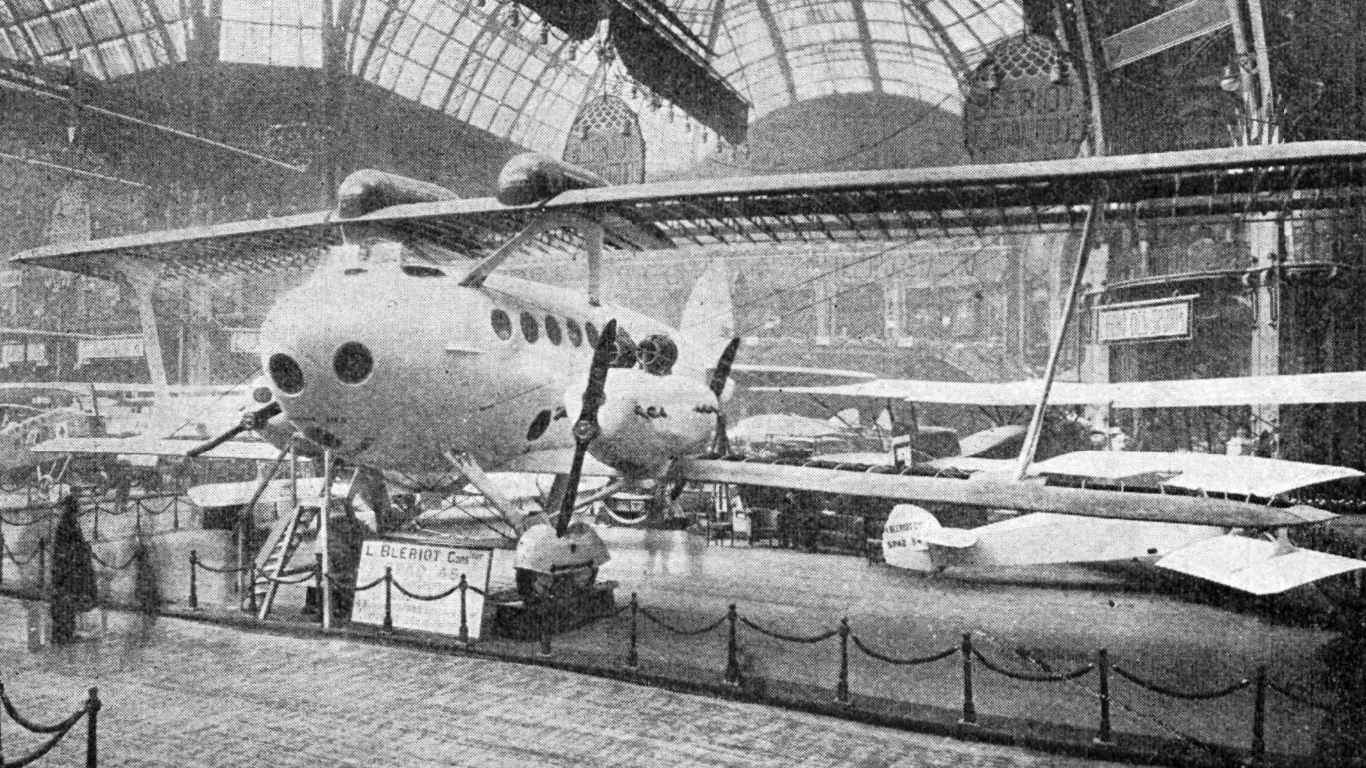
- At the 1921 Paris Salon

General information
- Type: Airliner
- National origin: France
- Manufacturer: Blériot Aéronautique
- Designer: André Herbement
- Number built: 1

History
- First flight: May not have flown

The Blériot-Spad S.45 was a large, four engine French airliner which appeared at the 1921 Paris Salon. It could carry fifteen passengers or be adapted as a bomber.

== Design and development ==
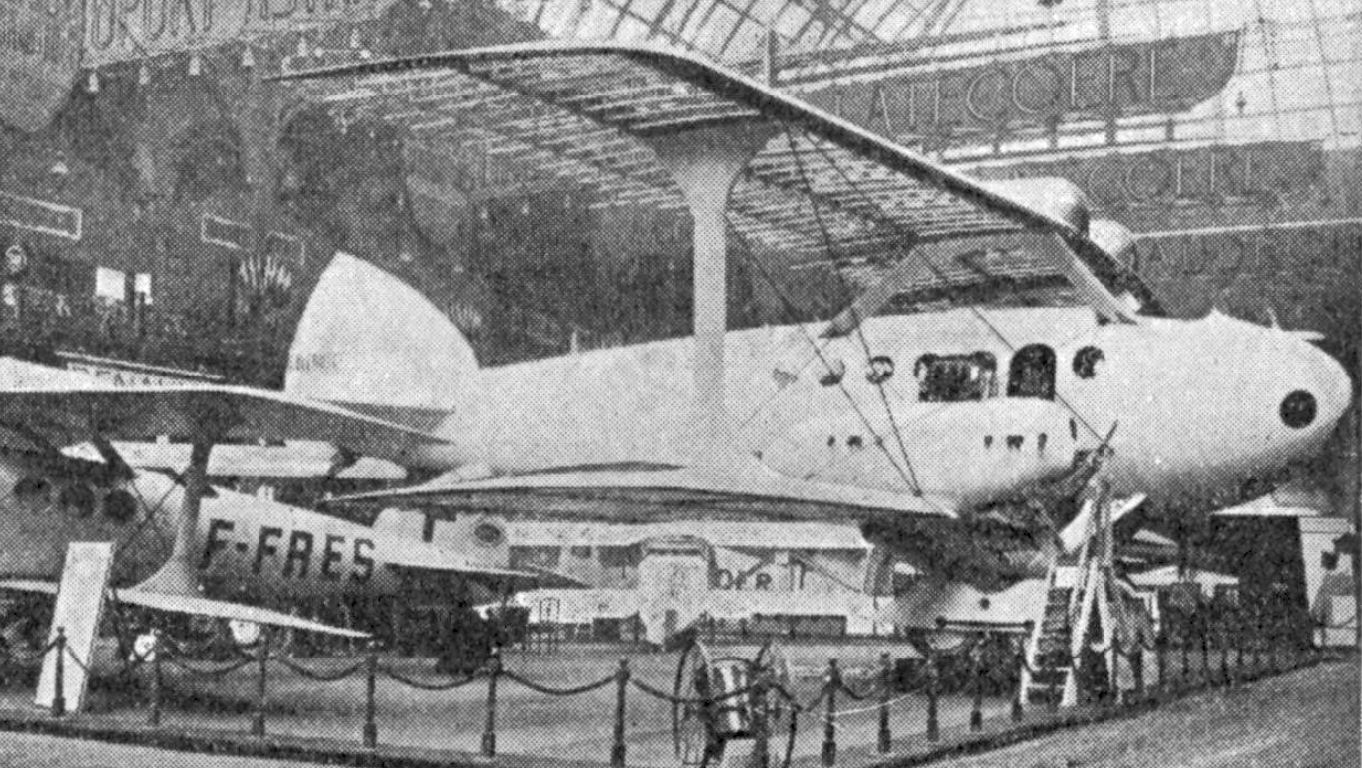

The Blériot-SPAD S.45 was a large, French biplane airliner built shortly after the end of World War I. It was designed by André Herbement and retained some of the characteristics of his earlier, smaller Blériot-SPAD airliners, notably the combination of a swept upper wing with a smaller, unswept lower one. It was his first four engine aircraft and was of largely wooden construction.

Despite its size it was a single bay biplane braced by single, outwards-leaning interplane struts with large feet which reached between the single upper and lower spars and the ply-covered leading edge D-boxes. The lower wings were conventionally mounted to the lower fuselage and the upper wing was held high above the fuselage by a frame including outward leaning members from just outside the engines to the fuselage. Ailerons filled the entire trailing edge of the lower wing beyond a central cut-out. The tail was conventional, with a mid-fuselage mounted tailplane and a fin carrying a rather pointed, balanced rudder.

The S.45 was powered by four 275 hp (205 kW) Hispano-Suiza water-cooled V8 engines, two, close together in pusher configuration on top of the upper wing and two, further apart, on the lower wing in tractor configuration. Fuel was held in two upper wing tanks and each engine was cooled with a cylindrical Lamblin radiator mounted in pairs between the engine nacelles.

Its fuselage was a wooden, circular section monocoque built from cross-grained layers of spruce and tulipwood. The three crew sat in individual open cockpits near the nose, with the navigator in front where large windows in the lower nose gave him a wide view of the ground and the two pilots side-by-side behind. Fifteen passengers sat in the enclosed cabin on seats arranged in five rows with two seats on the starboard side, one on the port side and a corridor between them. Each row had a window on either side. Entry was via a starboard-side door. There was a baggage space and a two seat toilet at the back.

The S.45 had a fixed, conventional undercarriage with a tailskid but its weight required more than the usual two mainwheels. Instead there was a pair of wheels in tandem under a shared fairing on each side. These were joined by a horizontal cross-member with its ends on V-struts to the fuselage, each stiffened laterally with a further strut.

== Operational history ==
Despite the interest it attracted at the 1921 Salon, there is no known record of it flying. It was still under construction not long before the Salon.

== Specifications ==
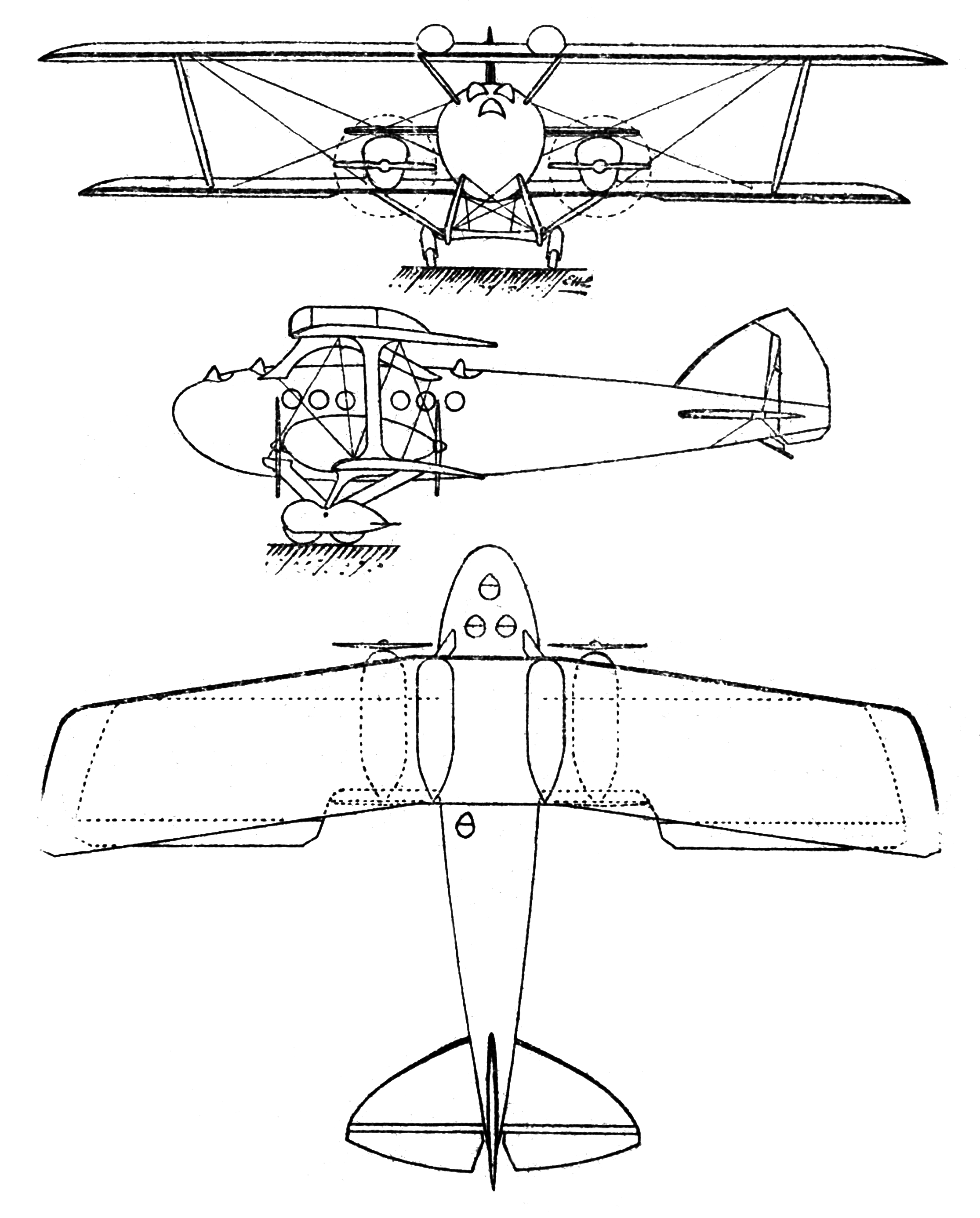

Data from Les Ailes, November 1921

General characteristics

- Crew: Three
- Capacity: Fifteen
- Length: 15.30 m (50 ft 2 in)
- Upper wingspan: 21.50 m (70 ft 6 in)
- Lower wingspan: 17.5 m (57 ft 5 in)
- Height: 5.80 m (19 ft 0 in)
- Wing area: 445 m^{2} (4,790 sq ft)
- Empty weight: 3,500 kg (7,716 lb)
- Gross weight: 7,000 kg (15,432 lb)
- Fuel capacity: 1,400 kg (3,100 lb)
- Powerplant: 4 × Hispano-Suiza water-cooled V-8, 205 kW (275 hp) each
- Propellers: 2-bladed

Performance

- Maximum speed: 200 km/h (120 mph, 110 kn)
- Range: 1,000 km (620 mi, 540 nmi) at full power
