= Murphy Yukon =

Canadian homebuilt light aircraft

Yukon
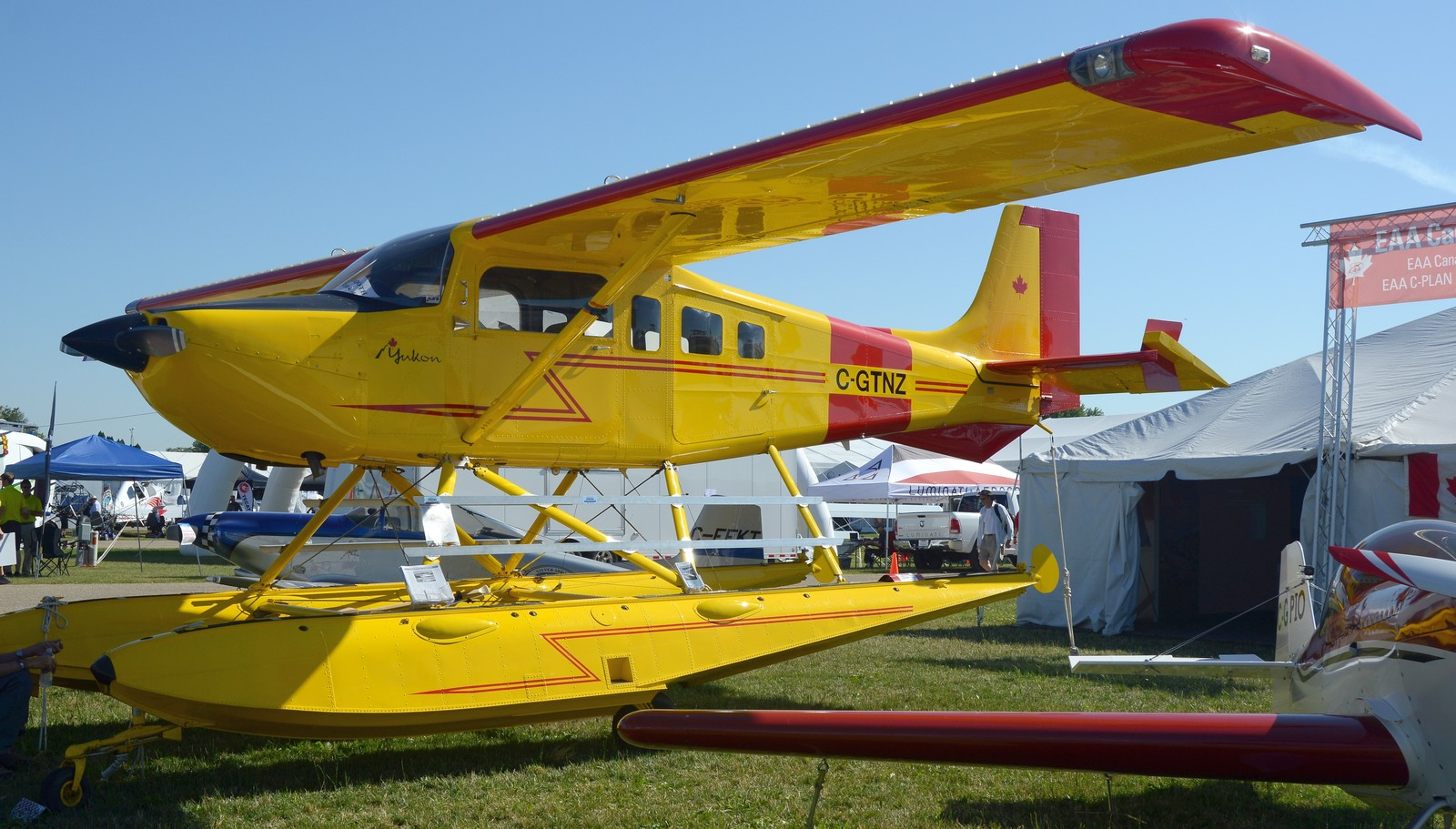
- Murphy Yukon with amphibious floats.

General information
- Type: Amateur-built aircraft
- National origin: Canada
- Manufacturer: Murphy Aircraft
- Status: In production (2019)
- Number built: at least three

History
- Manufactured: 2007-present
- Introduction date: 2007
- First flight: 2007
- Developed from: Murphy SR2500 Super Rebel and Murphy Moose

The Murphy Yukon is a Canadian amateur-built aircraft, produced by Murphy Aircraft of Chilliwack, British Columbia, introduced at the AirVenture show in 2007. The aircraft is supplied as a kit for amateur construction.

The design is derived from the Murphy SR2500 Super Rebel and Murphy Moose.

== Design and development ==
The Yukon was designed as a bush aircraft for fishing and camping flights, but with lower power and thus lower fuel consumption over the radial engine-powered Murphy Moose, making it more economical to operate. Design goals included simple jig-less construction, good cruise speed and docile low speed handling characteristics.

The aircraft features a strut-braced high-wing, a four-seats-in-side-by-side configuration enclosed cabin accessed by doors, fixed tricycle landing gear or conventional landing gear and a single engine in tractor configuration. The design features a large cargo compartment with a separate door for access.

The aircraft is made from semi-monocoque 6061-T6 aluminum sheet construction, with pre-punched holes from a numerical control design. The Yukon's wing employs a modified NACA 4415 airfoil, has an area of 190 sq ft (18 m^{2}) and mounts flaps. The standard engines used are the 180 hp (134 kW) Lycoming O-360 and the 210 hp (157 kW) Lycoming IO-390 four-stroke powerplants.

The aircraft is available as a complete kit, a fast build kit, or as three component sub-kits that can be purchased separately over time. These consist of a tail kit, wing kit and fuselage kit.

The kit is available in both nosewheel or taildragger configurations. The aircraft can also be mounted on straight or amphibious floats and skis.

== Operational history ==
In a 2008 review, Aero-News Network stated, "It's an adaptable bird, none-the-less, due to a "larger than life" passenger cabin and flexible seating arrangements. With all four seats in place, there is still sufficient room for two tents, coolers, chairs and camping gear for four. Removing the rear seat opens a HUGE area within which you can load items from stretchers to bicycles, or even use as sleeping accommodations!"

By January 2019, one example had been registered in the United States with the Federal Aviation Administration and two with Transport Canada.

== Specifications (Yukon) ==
Data from Manufacturer

General characteristics

- Crew: one
- Capacity: three passengers
- Wing area: 190 sq ft (18 m^{2})
- Empty weight: 1,400 lb (635 kg)
- Gross weight: 2,550 lb (1,157 kg)
- Fuel capacity: 60 U.S. gallons (230 L; 50 imp gal)
- Powerplant: 1 × Lycoming O-360 four cylinder, air-cooled, four stroke aircraft engine, 180 hp (130 kW)
- Propellers: 2-bladed Hartzell constant speed propeller

Performance

- Maximum speed: 135 mph (217 km/h, 117 kn)
- Cruise speed: 120 mph (190 km/h, 100 kn)
- Never exceed speed: 177 mph (285 km/h, 154 kn)
- Endurance: 5.5 hours
- g limits: +5.7/-3.8
- Power/mass: 14.1 lb/hp
