= Murphy Radical =

Light kit airplane

Radical

General information
- Type: Amateur-built aircraft
- National origin: Canada
- Manufacturer: Murphy Aircraft
- Designer: Darryl Murphy
- Status: In production (2023)
- Number built: Two (2023)

History
- Introduction date: 2016
- First flight: 2016

The Murphy Radical is a Canadian STOL amateur-built aircraft that was designed by Darryl Murphy and is under development by Murphy Aircraft of Chilliwack, British Columbia. The aircraft is supplied as a kit for amateur construction.

When originally announced in 2016, the all-new design was called the Radical Rebel, a reference to the earlier 1990 Murphy Rebel model.

== Design and development ==
The design was first announced in January 2016. Murphy explained the design goals, "feedback from our many existing Rebel owners tells us there is a market for an aircraft with even greater performance, power and STOL capabilities and we have been listening. Although the Rebel is a good foundation to start from, the new aircraft is essentially a brand new design. A higher gross weight, more wing area, and capable of using engines up to 220 hp, it will incorporate many of the best features of the Rebel, Elite, Maverick and Super Rebel."

The Radical prototype was first shown at AirVenture in July 2016, and at that time featured racks under each wing to suspend bicycles from, for use as ground transportation at destination. At that time production was forecast to start in 2017.

Even though the prototype flew in 2016, production was delayed by the sale of the company and upgrading the building documentation and kit design. Only one factory prototype and one customer prototype had been completed by March 2023, although four other kits were under customer construction. Full-scale kit production is expected to commence in the summer of 2023.

The aircraft features a cantilever strut-braced high-wing, a 2+2 cabin with two front fibreglass bucket seats in side-by-side configuration and a rear bench seat suitable for two children or small adults. The rear seat may be removed to provide a large baggage area. It has an enclosed cabin accessed by vertically hinged doors, fixed conventional landing gear and a single engine in tractor configuration. Tundra tires may be optionally fitted.

The aircraft is made from riveted aluminum sheet. Its 36 ft (11.0 m) span wing has an area of 180 sq ft (17 m^{2}) and mounts flaps. The standard engines used are the 180 hp (134 kW) Lycoming O-360 and the 220 hp (164 kW) Lycoming IO-390 four-stroke powerplants.

== Operational history ==
By March 2023, no examples had been registered in the United States with the Federal Aviation Administration and two with Transport Canada.

In a 2017 review for KitPlanes, Paul Dye wrote, "the company’s new Radical is a prime example of youthful inspiration in today’s world. With plenty of power and lifting capability, it’s a machine that can get into tight places and carry enough gear to enjoy those places once you’ve landed. It’s the stuff of TV commercials aimed at the youth who enjoy extreme sports—but it’s also an outstanding flying machine for people of all ages who strongly desire to visit the most magnificent, out-of-the-way places on earth."

In a 2023 AVweb review, Tom Wilson wrote, "walking up to the Radical it comes off as just a little larger than you thought. Much of that is the generous 36-foot wingspan propped up on 31-inch tires—tall guys appreciate the little extra height under the wing. Thanks to the large, single-piece, upward-hinged doors being completely out of the way when opened against the bottom of the wing, getting yourself or gear in the Radical is a wide-open task. Tall people need to slide the front seat all the way aft before entering or risk an awkwardly stiff moment getting their feet around the control stick. Once in, there is truly generous room for two big adults; there's no need to rub shoulders, only to scoot the seat forward to reach the rudder pedals and assume a flying position. Legroom is unquestionably large and headroom is open as well. With no spar carry-through and a reasonably tall cabin there’s no sense of having your head up inside the wing roots."

== Specifications (version) ==
Data from AvWeb and manufacturer

General characteristics

- Crew: one
- Capacity: three passengers
- Wingspan: 30 ft 0 in (9.14 m)
- Wing area: 180 sq ft (17 m^{2})
- Empty weight: 1,150 lb (522 kg)
- Gross weight: 2,100 lb (953 kg)
- Fuel capacity: 44 U.S. gallons (170 L; 37 imp gal)
- Powerplant: 1 × Lycoming O-360 four cylinder, air-cooled, four stroke aircraft engine, 180 hp (130 kW)
- Propellers: 2-bladed Catto fixed-pitch

Performance

- Cruise speed: 100 mph (160 km/h, 87 kn)
- Stall speed: 39 mph (63 km/h, 34 kn)
- Never exceed speed: 140 mph (230 km/h, 120 kn)
- Rate of climb: 1,000 ft/min (5.1 m/s)
- Wing loading: 11.66 lb/sq ft (56.9 kg/m^{2})
