= Murphy JDM-8 =

Canadian ultralight aircraft

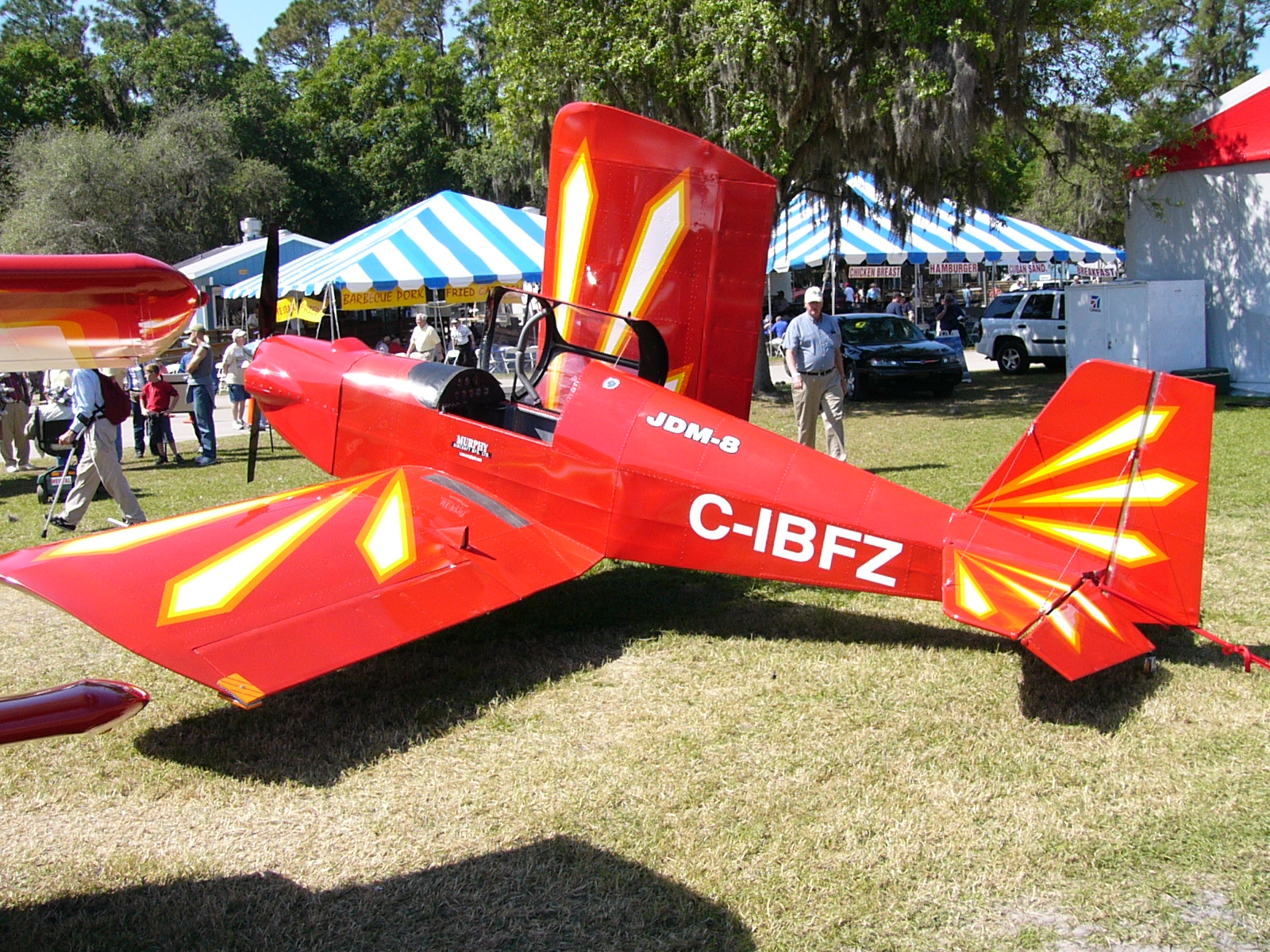
- JDM-8 advanced ultralight prototype powered by an HKS 700E, with one wing folded

General information
- Type: Single-seat homebuilt Ultralight
- National origin: Canada
- Manufacturer: Murphy Aircraft
- Designer: Daryl Murphy
- Status: Prototypes only
- Number built: 2

History
- First flight: March 2001

The Murphy JDM-8 is a Canadian single-seat ultralight monoplane designed by Darryl Murphy. The type was intended to be sold as a kit for home construction by Murphy Aircraft of Chilliwack, British Columbia.

The designation indicates the designer's initials, J. Darryl Murphy and his eighth design.

== Design and development ==
Work was begun on the JDM-8 design in December 1998, but the project was not a high priority and so did not fly until March 2001. The aircraft was first publicly shown at Sun 'n Fun 2000 when it was not yet complete.

The JDM-8 is an all-metal low-wing cantilever monoplane designed in two variants, one to meet the American FAR 103 Ultralight Vehicles regulations and one for the non-American markets particularly Canada and Europe. The JDM-8 has a conventional landing gear with a tailwheel and can be powered by a Rotax engine from 20-80HP. An unusual feature is the upwards folding wing for storage and transportation.

The fuselage of the JDM-8 is of semi-monocoque aluminum construction. The 5 US gal (19 L) fuel tank is located in front of the instrument panel. The conventional main landing gear for the ultralight version is bungee suspended and includes brakes, while the main landing gear of the homebuilt version is of a sprung design. The tail wheel spring is of 4140 steel and incorporates an inline skate wheel.

The JDM-8 wing is constructed with an aluminum D-cell leading edge incorporating a 9 in (23 cm) high C-channel main spar made from 6061-T6 grade aluminum. The rear spar is a similar C-channel that is 5 in (12.7 cm) high and there is a third nose spar that is 3 in (7.6 cm) in height. The wing aft of the D-cell is covered in aircraft fabric and has a modified NACA 4415 airfoil with a drooped trailing edge. The 11 nose ribs and nine aft wing ribs are made from hydroformed aluminum. The ailerons were adapted from the Murphy Rebel design and are 69 in (175 cm) long with a 15 in (38 cm) chord. The ultralight version has a 4 ft (122 cm) greater wingspan to lower its stall speed to below the US ultralight category limit of 28 mph (45 km/h). With the wings folded the homebuilt version is 8.75 ft (267 cm) high and the ultralight version with its longer wings is 10.9 ft (332 cm) high.

The horizontal tailplane is 95 in (241 cm) in span to allow legal road transportation on a trailer as most jurisdictions limit trailers to 96 in (244 cm). The ultralight version has an ultimate load limit of +5/-2.7 g and an operational limit of +3.8/-1.8g, while the homebuilt version has an ultimate limit of +5.7/-5.7g and an operational limit of +3.8/-3.8 g.

The kit supplied for the JDM-8 was intended to include the parts to make both versions and the manufacturer claimed a construction time from the kit of 800 hours.

The completed prototype JDM-8 was displayed at Sun 'n Fun in April 2004, but due to the introduction in the US of the light-sport aircraft category at the same time, no orders were forthcoming and by 2008 the aircraft was no longer listed as being available by Patterson AeroSales, the manufacturer's sole sales agent.

== Operational history ==
In January 2011 there were two JDM-8s registered in Canada, one a basic ultralight and the other an advanced ultralight, both owned by the manufacturer.

== Variants ==
US ultralight version
Single seat, low-wing monoplane with 24 ft (7.3 m) wingspan, powered by a 28 hp (21 kW) Rotax 277 or other engine of 25 to 30 hp (19 to 22 kW) for the US ultralight category
Homebuilt version
Single seat, low-wing monoplane with 20 ft (6.1 m) wingspan, powered by engines up to 80 hp (60 kW), including the powered by a 60 hp (45 kW) HKS 700E for the Canadian basic ultralight, advanced ultralight or amateur-built categories

== Specifications (FAR-103 Variant) ==
Data from World Directory of Leisure Aviation, Levy and Kitplanes

General characteristics

- Crew: 1
- Wingspan: 24 ft 0 in (7.32 m) homebuilt version has a 20 foot wingspan
- Wing area: 120 sq ft (11 m^{2})
- Airfoil: modified NACA 4415
- Empty weight: 254 lb (115 kg)
- Gross weight: 500 lb (227 kg)
- Fuel capacity: 5 US gallons (19 litres)
- Powerplant: 1 × Rotax 277 single cylinder two-stroke piston engine, 28 hp (21 kW)
- Propellers: 2-bladed GSC wooden, 5 ft 0 in (1.52 m) diameter with a pitch of 32 inches

Performance

- Maximum speed: 63 mph (101 km/h, 55 kn)
- Cruise speed: 55 mph (89 km/h, 48 kn)
- Stall speed: 26 mph (42 km/h, 23 kn)
- g limits: +3.8/-1.8
- Rate of climb: 800 ft/min (4.1 m/s)

== See also ==
Aircraft of comparable role, configuration, and era

- Ameri-Cana Eureka
- Bowers Fly Baby
