= Bush plane =

Airplane used in remote or underdeveloped areas

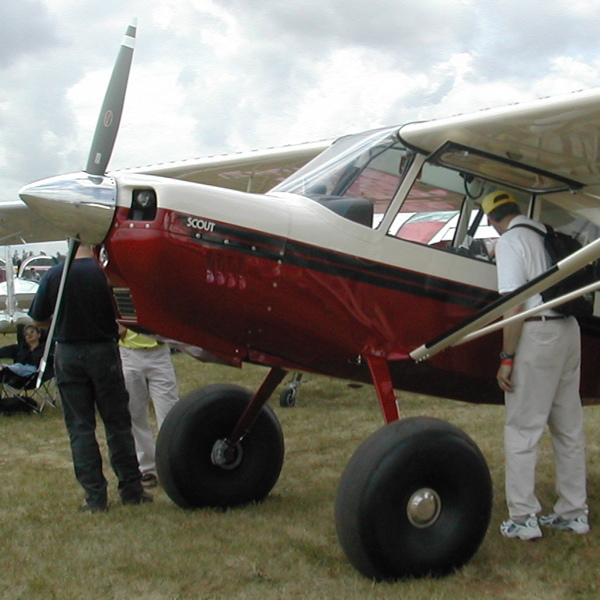
An American Champion Scout. Note the oversized tundra tires, for use on rough surfaces.

A bush plane or bushplane is a general aviation aircraft used to provide both scheduled and unscheduled passenger and flight services to remote, undeveloped areas, such as the Canadian north or bush, Alaskan tundra, the African bush, or savanna, Amazon rainforest and the Australian Outback. They are used where ground transportation infrastructure is inadequate or does not exist.

== Common traits ==
A bush plane is defined by how it is used, and many different aircraft with different configurations have been so used over the years. However, experience has shown certain traits to be desirable (though not mandatory), especially on aircraft specifically designed as bush planes.

- Undercarriage designed to be fitted with floats, skis or wheel/skis to permit operation from water or snow—primarily for Canadian, Alaskan and Russian use.
- High wings ease loading and unloading, particularly from docks; improve downward visibility during flight; and increase clearance to reduce the potential for damage during landing, take-off, loading, and unloading.
- Conventional or "tail dragger" landing gear—two large main wheels and a small rear wheel—reduces both weight and drag, increasing the aircraft's speed and useful load. It reduces stress on the airframe compared to a nosewheel. A failure is also less critical, as a broken tailwheel is easily repaired and does not prevent the aircraft from flying, unlike a broken nose wheel.
- Short runway performance and low-speed flight characteristics are typically improved by high aspect ratio wings and high-lift devices such as flaps, slots and slats.
- Very large, low-pressure tundra tires may be fitted to enable the pilot to operate from broken ground. It is not uncommon for a bush pilot to land and take off from unprepared surfaces.
- Piston engines are preferred over turboprops, as they are cheaper to build and maintain and easier to start without the aid of ground facilities. In extremely remote areas where avgas can be difficult to acquire, some bush pilots prefer turboprop engines that can burn kerosene-derived jet fuel.

== Current and historical bush planes ==
Years in brackets are of first flight.

- AAC Angel (1984)
- Aermacchi AL-60 (1959)
- Antonov An-2 (1947)
- Antonov An-14 (1958)
- Antonov An-28 (1968)
- Antonov An-38 (1994)
- Auster Autocrat (1945)
- Aviat Husky (1986)
- Avro Avian (1926)
- Avro Anson (1935)
- Avro York (1942)
- Bach T-11P (1927)
- Barkley-Grow T8P-1 (1937)
- Barrows Bearhawk (1995)
- Beechcraft Model 17 Staggerwing (1932)
- Beechcraft Model 18 (1937)
- Bellanca CH-300 Pacemaker (1929)
- Bellanca CH-400 Skyrocket (1930)
- Bellanca Aircruiser (1930)
- Bellanca Senior Pacemaker (1935)
- Bellanca Senior Skyrocket (1935)
- Boeing B1E (1928)
- Bristol Freighter (1945)
- Britten-Norman BN-2 Islander (1965)
- Buhl Airsedan (1928)
- Bushcaddy L-162 Max (1995)
- Bushcaddy L-164 (2007)
- Canadian Vickers Vedette (1924)
- Cessna Crane (1939)
- Cessna 172 (1956)
- Cessna 180 (1952)
- Cessna 182 Skylane (1956)
- Cessna 185 Skywagon (1960)
- Cessna 206 Stationair (1962)
- Cessna 208 Caravan (1982)
- Champion Citabria (1964)
- Consolidated Catalina/Canso (1935)
- CubCrafters CC19 XCub (2016)
- Curtiss HS (1917)
- Curtiss Lark (1925)
- Curtiss Robin (1928)
- Curtiss Thrush (1929)
- Curtiss-Wright C-46 Commando (1940)
- Curtiss-Wright Junior (1930)
- de Havilland DH.60 Moth (1925)
- de Havilland DH.61 Giant Moth (1927)
- de Havilland DH.82 Tiger Moth (1931)
- de Havilland DH.83 Fox Moth (1932)
- de Havilland DH.89 Dragon Rapide (1934)
- de Havilland DH.90 Dragonfly (1935)
- de Havilland Australia DHA-3 Drover (1948)
- de Havilland Canada DHC-2 Beaver (1947)
- de Havilland Canada DHC-3 Otter (1951)
- de Havilland Canada DHC-4 Caribou (1958)
- de Havilland Canada DHC-6 Twin Otter (1965)
- Dornier Do 27 (1955)
- Douglas Dolphin (1930)
- Douglas DC-3/Douglas C-47 (1935)
- Douglas DC-4 (1942)
- Eastman E-2 Sea Rover (1928)
- Evangel 4500 (1964)
- Fairchild 24 (1932)
- Fairchild C-82 Packet (1944)
- Fairchild FC-2/51 (1926)
- Fairchild 71 (1926)
- Fairchild Super 71 (1934)
- Fairchild 100 (1930)
- Fairchild 82 (1935)
- Fairchild F-11 Husky (1946)
- Fieseler Fi 156 Storch (1936)
- Fleet Freighter (1938)
- Fokker Universal (1926)
- Fokker Super Universal (1928)
- Fokker F.11 (1928)
- Ford Trimotor (1926)
- Found FBA-2 (1960)
- GAF Nomad (1971)
- Gippsland GA8 (1995)
- Gippsland GA10 (2012)
- Grumman Goose (1937)
- Grumman Widgeon (1940)
- Grumman Mallard (1946)
- Halpin Flamingo (1929)
- Hamilton H-47 (1928)
- Helio Courier (1954)
- Howard DGA-8/9/11/12 (1936)
- Howard DGA-15 (1939)
- Johns Ra-Son Warrior (1947)
- Junkers F.13 (1919)
- Junkers G 31 (1926)
- Junkers W 33 (1926)
- Junkers W 34 (1926)
- Junkers Ju 52/1m (1930)
- Kitfox (1984)
- Lake Buccaneer (1960)
- Lockheed Vega (1927)
- Lockheed Model 18 Lodestar (1939)
- Max Holste Broussard (1952)
- Maule M-7 (1984)
- Murphy Rebel (1990)
- Murphy Moose (1995)
- Murphy Elite (1996)
- Noorduyn Norseman (1935)
- Northrop N-23 Pioneer (1946)
- Northwest Ranger (1968)
- PAC P-750 XSTOL (2001)
- Piper J-3 Cub (1938)
- Piper PA-18 Super Cub (1949)
- Piper PA-22 Bushmaster
- Piper PA-23 (1952)
- Pipistrel Virus SW (2006)
- Pilatus PC-6 Porter/Turbo Porter (1959)
- Polikarpov Po-2 (1927)
- PZL-104 Wilga (1962)
- Quest Kodiak (2004)
- Rans S-7 Courier (1985)
- Republic RC-3 Seabee (1945)
- Rutan Grizzly (1982)
- Ryan Brougham (1927)
- Shavrov Sh-2 (1930)
- Short SC.7 Skyvan (1963)
- Sikorsky S-38 (1928)
- Sikorsky S-39 (1929)
- Stearman C3 (1927)
- Stearman M-2 (1929)
- Stearman 4 (1930)
- Stinson Detroiter (1926)
- Stinson Junior (1928)
- Stinson Model A (1934)
- Stinson Reliant (1933)
- Stinson Voyager (1939)
- Stinson 108 (1946)
- Supermarine Sea Otter (converted after 2nd World War)
- Technoavia SM92 Finist (1993)
- Travel Air 6000 (1928)
- Vickers Viking (1919)
- Waco 10 (1927)
- Waco Standard Cabin series (1931)
- Waco AQC-6/Waco ZQC-6 Freighter (1936)
- Westland Limousine (1919)
- Wild DoubleEnder (2010)
- Yakovlev Yak-12 (1947)
- Zenith STOL CH 701 (1986)

== Aviation museums with large collections of bush planes ==
- Alberta Aviation Museum
- Alaska Aviation Heritage Museum
- Canada Aviation and Space Museum
- Canadian Bushplane Heritage Centre
- Pioneer Air Museum
- Western Canada Aviation Museum

== See also ==
- List of STOL aircraft
- Floatplane
- Ontario Provincial Air Service - played major role in the development of bush flying and bushplanes.
- Bush flying
- Bush mechanic
