= Bowers Namu II =

Namu II

General information
- Type: Recreational aircraft
- Manufacturer: Homebuilt
- Designer: Peter Bowers
- Number built: 4

History
- First flight: 2 July 1975

The Bowers Namu II was a single-engine, two-seat, recreational aircraft, designed and flown in the United States in the late 1970s and marketed for homebuilding. It was designed by famed aircraft designer and Boeing historian Peter Bowers.

== Development ==
The aircraft was a follow-on project to the designer's earlier Bowers Fly Baby design, if considerably larger; a low-wing cantilever monoplane with an inverted gull wing and fixed tailwheel undercarriage, designed to carry two persons (the Fly Baby was a single-seat aircraft). The Namu II accommodated a passenger seated beside the pilot. The aircraft's somewhat portly lines provided the "Namu II" name, after Namu, the orca captive in Bower's home city of Seattle, Washington State.

Sales were disappointing, and out of the few plan sets sold, only four examples were constructed, one of which sported an orca paint job.

== Operational history ==
In November 2022, there were no Namus remaining registered in the United States with the Federal Aviation Administration.

== Specifications ==
Data from Jane's All The World's Aircraft 1976–77

General characteristics

- Crew: one pilot
- Capacity: 1 passenger
- Length: 21 ft 6 in (6.55 m)
- Wingspan: 33 ft 0 in (10.06 m)
- Wing area: 150 sq ft (14 m^{2})
- Airfoil: NACA 4415 root, NACA 4412 tip
- Empty weight: 1,200 lb (544 kg)
- Gross weight: 1,850 lb (839 kg)
- Fuel capacity: 32 US gal (27 imp gal; 120 L)
- Powerplant: 1 × Lycoming O-290G air-cooled flat-four engine , 125 hp (93 kW)

Performance

- Maximum speed: 140 mph (230 km/h, 120 kn)
- Cruise speed: 126 mph (203 km/h, 109 kn)
- Range: 500 mi (800 km, 430 nmi)
- Service ceiling: 15,000 ft (4,600 m)
- Rate of climb: 950 ft/min (4.8 m/s)
