= Duane's Hangar Ultrababy =

American homebuilt aircraft

Ultrababy

General information
- Type: Homebuilt aircraft
- National origin: United States
- Manufacturer: Duane's Hangar
- Designer: Duane Patrick
- Status: Production completed
- Number built: At least one

History
- Introduction date: circa 1997
- Developed from: Bowers Fly Baby

The Duane's Hangar Ultrababy (sometimes Ultra Baby) is an American homebuilt aircraft that was designed by Duane Patrick and produced by Duane's Hangar of Liberty, South Carolina, introduced about 1997. When it was available the aircraft was supplied in the form of plans for amateur construction.

== Design and development ==
The aircraft is a 75% scale version of the Bowers Fly Baby intended to comply with the US FAR 103 Ultralight Vehicles rules, including the category's maximum empty weight of 254 lb (115 kg). It can have a sufficiently low enough empty weight for that category when a light enough engine is fitted. The Ultrababy can also be registered in the American homebuilt aircraft category.

The Ultrababy features a wire-braced low-wing, a single-seat open cockpit with a windshield, fixed conventional landing gear and a single engine in tractor configuration.

The aircraft is made from wood, with its flying surfaces covered in doped aircraft fabric. Its 27.50 ft (8.4 m) span wing lacks flaps and has a wing area of 121.5 sq ft (11.29 m^{2}). The acceptable power range is 35 to 52 hp (26 to 39 kW) and the standard engine used is the 48 hp (36 kW) Half VW powerplant.

With the Half VW engine the Ultrababy has a typical empty weight of 300 lb (140 kg) and a gross weight of 620 lb (280 kg), giving a useful load of 320 lb (150 kg). With full fuel of 5 U.S. gallons (19 L; 4.2 imp gal) the payload for pilot and baggage is 290 lb (130 kg).

The designer estimates the construction time from the supplied plans as 700 hours.

== Operational history ==
By 1998 the company reported that 40 sets of plans had been sold and one aircraft was flying.

== Specifications (Ultrababy) ==
Data from AeroCrafter

General characteristics

- Crew: one
- Length: 16 ft 0 in (4.88 m)
- Wingspan: 27 ft 6 in (8.38 m)
- Wing area: 121.5 sq ft (11.29 m^{2})
- Empty weight: 300 lb (136 kg)
- Gross weight: 620 lb (281 kg)
- Fuel capacity: 5 U.S. gallons (19 L; 4.2 imp gal)
- Powerplant: 1 × Half VW two cylinder, air-cooled, four stroke automotive conversion engine, 48 hp (36 kW)
- Propellers: 2-bladed wooden

Performance

- Maximum speed: 75 mph (121 km/h, 65 kn)
- Cruise speed: 60 mph (97 km/h, 52 kn)
- Stall speed: 35 mph (56 km/h, 30 kn)
- Range: 150 mi (240 km, 130 nmi)
- Service ceiling: 10,000 ft (3,000 m)
- Rate of climb: 600 ft/min (3.0 m/s)
- Wing loading: 5.1 lb/sq ft (25 kg/m^{2})
