= Peter M. Bowers =

American journalist

- Born: May 15, 1918
- Died: April 27, 2003 (aged 84)
- Education: Boeing School of Aeronautics
- Employer: Boeing
- Known for: aviation journalist, author, historian, engineer
- Height: 6 ft 2 in (188 cm)

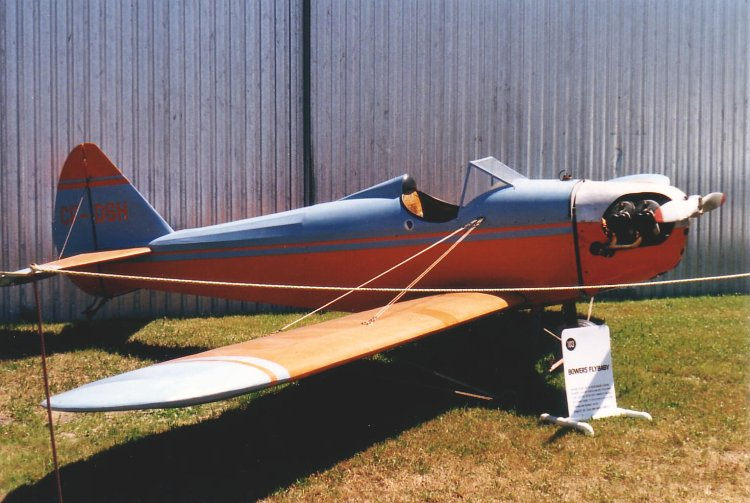
Bowers's amateur-built airplane design, the Fly Baby

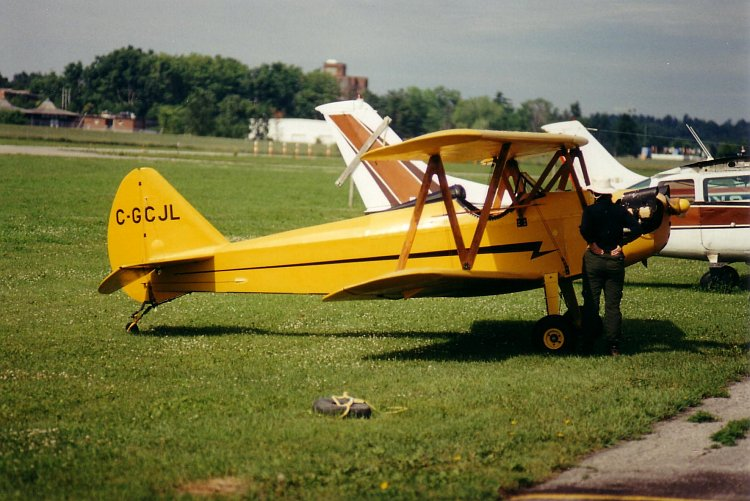
A Bowers Bi-Baby, this is the Fly Baby with the optional upper wing installed.

Peter M. Bowers (May 15, 1918 – April 27, 2003) was an American aeronautical engineer, airplane designer, and a journalist and historian specializing in the field of aviation.

An engineer for planemaker Boeing for over 35 years, Bowers is famed in the aviation community for his role as a military and general aviation historian and writer, and designer of the popular Bowers Fly Baby homebuilt aircraft design.

== Personal and early life ==
Bowers lived in Seattle, Washington, for most of his life.

Bowers's first ride in an aircraft was in 1928, at the age of 10. He began intensively designing and building aircraft models, which led to requests for plans and articles about them from editors of model airplane magazines—his first article appearing in 1938 in Air Trails.

Bowers took a course in aeronautical engineering at the Boeing School of Aeronautics in Seattle, then enrolled as an Engineering Cadet in the Army Air Corps. During World War II, and after, Bowers spent five years in the U.S. Army Air Forces as a maintenance and intelligence officer, before his discharge in 1947.

== Aeronautical career ==
Following his 1947 discharge from the military, Bowers went to work for The Boeing Company in Seattle, eventually becoming an aeronautical and research engineer for the company, and remained with the company for 36 years.

Bowers learned to fly in 1948, and by 1962 had reportedly logged over 3,000 hours of flight time, mostly in sailplanes, homebuilt aircraft, antique aircraft, and "other romantic types"—becoming "an internationally-known consultant on aviation history and sport flying."

Bowers's designing and building of model aircraft evolved into developing actual, full-size aircraft.

In 1961, to commemorate the 50th anniversary of the first trans-continental flight, Bowers crafted a reproduction of the Wright Brothers' Vin Fiz Flyer (first plane to fly across the U.S.). The plane was built to airworthy standards, and flown as a towed glider, before becoming a display in the San Diego Air and Space Museum.

Starting in the 1950s, and culminating in 1962, Bowers designed a noted homebuilt aircraft, the Bowers Fly Baby (winner of the 1962 Design Contest of the Experimental Aircraft Association—one of the most successful homebuilt designs, eventually built by over 500 homebuilders)

Bowers also designed and built the Namu II, and also completed and flew a Detroit G1 Gull primary glider.

Under its Fly Baby entry, Jane's All The World's Aircraft, 1964–1965, says of Bowers:

Mr. Peter Bowers, an aeronautical engineer with Boeing in Seattle, is a principal source of detailed information on vintage aircraft in the United States, and has provided much of the data for a number of replicas of 1914-18 War aircraft now under construction or flying. He is currently engaged on a redesign of the Fokker D.VIII monoplane of 1918 in association with Herr Rheinhold Platz, the original designer, with a view to starting a replica building program.

A full-scale Fokker Triplane replica of this period has been under construction by Mr. Bowers for nearly five years. At least six others are known to be under construction from plans that he has provided.

Another aircraft built by Mr. Bowers is a full-scale replica of the Wright Model EX of 1911, the first aeroplane to cross the American continent. This machine was tested as a towed sailplane in the Autumn of 1961 and is to be powered by a converted "B" Ford automobile engine from a 1938 Funk monoplane.

In addition to this work on replicas, Mr. Bowers has designed and built a single-seat light aircraft known as the Fly Baby...

Bowers was the founding president of the EAA's Chapter 26, in the Seattle area.

== Aviation media career ==
One of the principal U.S. aviation historians of the 20th century, Bowers wrote or co-authored over 40 aviation books, and several hundred magazine and journal articles. His first articles, about his model airplane designs, appeared in Air Trails magazine in 1938. By the time his plans for his full-sized airplane, the Fly Baby, began appearing in the EAA magazine Sport Aviation, in 1963, he had already published his first books about aircraft.

Bowers was an avid aviation photographer—particularly noted for photography of historic aircraft—accumulating over 25,000 negatives in his collection by 1962. The photos further supported his publications. The collection became known as one of the largest such collections in the nation, and is now in the archives of the Museum of Flight in Seattle. Bowers wrote a text on the subject, A Complete Guide to Aviation Photography (TAB Books, 1980), which was reprinted in several subsequent editions.

In the 1960s, Bowers was among a small handful of writers chronicling U.S. military aviation. He served as a contributing editor for Sentry Publications' twin magazine titles Wings and Airpower, drawing on the lifetime of aviation photographs of his own, and of a vast archive collected through his employment at Boeing.

Bowers was a member of the first board of directors of the American Aviation Historical Society (AAHS), and a principal contributor to the AAHS Journal from its first issue in 1956 until the late 1960s.

Starting in 1972, Bowers wrote over 800 articles detailing historic aircraft for a column in General Aviation News called "Of Wings and Things." Bowers was a fixture of the newspaper for decades, until his death in 2003.

== Awards and recognition ==
- 1962: Winner of the Experimental Aircraft Association's 1962 Design Contest (reportedly the only one ever held), for his Bowers Fly Baby
- 1968: Dr. August Raspet Memorial Award, Experimental Aircraft Association, for Outstanding Contribution to the Advancement of Light Aircraft
- 1968: service to the EAA award.
- 2002: Books with Swanborough recommended, by Air and Space Magazine, as two top sources on early American military aircraft.
- 2017: Stearman book identified as one of three "quasi-classic" histories of the man and the planes by HistoryNet.com

== Death ==
Bowers died in 2003 from cancer.

== Publications ==
During his career, Bowers authored or co-authored over 40 books on aviation subjects, and over 800 magazine and journal articles. This is a partial list.

=== Magazines & Journals ===
- Air Trails
- AOPA Pilot
- Sport Aviation, Experimental Aircraft Association (EAA)
- AAHS Journal, American Aviation Historical Society
- Air Classics
- Airpower (Sentry Publications)
- Wings (Sentry Publications)
- Western Flyer (1972, began his aviation history column "Of Wings and Things")
- General Aviation News ("Of Wings and Things" column, continued. His columns are partially compiled in the book Of Wings & Things, Vol. 1: 1972-1979, 2000)

=== Books ===
Bowers authored or co-authored over 40 aviation books, including a dozen about aircraft of Boeing (or about aircraft of companies that Boeing acquired).

==== Aviation generally ====
- Soaring guide, with Robert L. Parks, 1966
- Soaring in America, 2nd Ed., Soaring Society of America, Inc. 1967
- Modern Aviation Library Vol. 2 No. 202, with Don Downie, Robert T. Smith, Harold Krier, 1979
- A Complete Guide to Aviation Photography, 1st ed., March 1980, (6th ed., 1988), TAB Books, Blue Ridge, Pennsylvania, ISBN 0-8306-0924-5

==== Aircraft generally ====
- Antique Plane Guide, Modern Aircraft Series, Sports Car Press, NY, 1962; 1981
- Yesterday's Wings, 1974
- Pedigree of Champions: Boeing since 1916 (6th ed.), May 1985, The Boeing Company, Seattle, Washington, LOC: 85–71915.
- The DC-3: 50 Years of Legendary Flight, May 1, 1986
- Curtiss Aircraft, 1907-1947, 1987
- Unconventional Aircraft, April 1, 1990
- Scale Aircraft Drawings: World War 2, Vol. 2, 1991
- Lockheed Constellation: Design, Development, and Service History of all Civil and Military Constellations, Super Constellations, and Starliners, with Curtis K. Stringfellow, December 1, 1991
- Triplanes: A Pictorial History of the World's Triplanes and Multiplanes, with Ernest R. McDowell, 1993
- Wings of Stearman: The Story of Lloyd Stearman and the Classic Stearman Biplanes, Historic Aircraft Series, December 1, 1998, ASIN : B08GKTCCSH
- Of Wings & Things, Vol. 1: 1972–1979, 2000
- America's Outstanding Aircraft of World War II: Plus Odd Aircraft, October 15, 2011
- Scale Aircraft Drawings, September 10, 2021
- Stearman Guidebook: Book 1: American Aircraft Series, with Mitch Mayborn

==== Civilian aircraft ====
- Guide to Homebuilts, Modern Aircraft Series, Sports Car Press, NY, 1962; 1984
- Fly Baby Builders Manual, 1964
- Aircraft Profile series, Profile Publications Ltd. (U.K.):

- Aircraft Profile No. 51: The Gee Bee Racers, 1965

- Flying the Boeing Model Eighty, 1984

==== Military aircraft ====
- The Sixty Best Airplanes of World War One (60), 1960
- World War Two: Outstanding U.S. Aircraft Plus Odd Aircraft, 1961
- Aircraft Profile series, Profile Publications Ltd. (U.K.):

- Aircraft Profile No. 14: The Boeing P-26A, 1965
- Aircraft Profile No. 37: The Curtiss JN-4, 1965
- Aircraft Profile No. 45: The Curtiss Army Hawks, 1965
- Aircraft Profile No. 2: The Boeing P-12E, 1966
- Aircraft Profile No. 79: The Nieuport N.28C-I, 1966
- Aircraft Profile No. 80: The Curtiss Hawk 75, 1966
- Aircraft Profile No. 83: The Boeing B-47, 1966
- Aircraft Profile No. 97: The American DH4, 1966
- Aircraft Profile No. 116: The Curtiss Navy Hawks, 1966
- Aircraft Profile No. 245: Boeing B-52A/H Stratofortress, ASIN: B0007BNZS6, 1972

- Fortress in the Sky: The Story of Boeing's B-17, 1976
- United States Navy Aircraft Since 1911, with Gordon Swanborough, Naval Institute Press, Annapolis, MD, 1976 (Second Edition, 1982)
- 50th Anniversary: Boeing B-17 Flying Fortress, 1935-1985, 1985
- United States Military Aircraft Since 1909, with Gordon Swanborough, Smithsonian Institution Press, August 1, 1989
- United States Navy Aircraft Since 1911, with Gordon Swanborough, Naval Institute Press, 1990
- Scale Aircraft Drawings: Volume I - World War I and Volume II - World War II, 1991
- Boeing B-29 Superfortress - Warbirdtech Vol 14, April 14, 1999
- Buzz Numbers, with W. David Menard, July 11, 2006
- The Fokkers of World War I: Hobby Helpers Library, No. 150, with Air Progress magazine, October 13, 2012

== Sources ==
- Taylor, John W.R., ed.. Jane's All The World's Aircraft 1964–1965. New York: McGraw-Hill, 1964. p. 196.
