= Murphy Elite =

Canadian homebuilt light aircraft

Elite
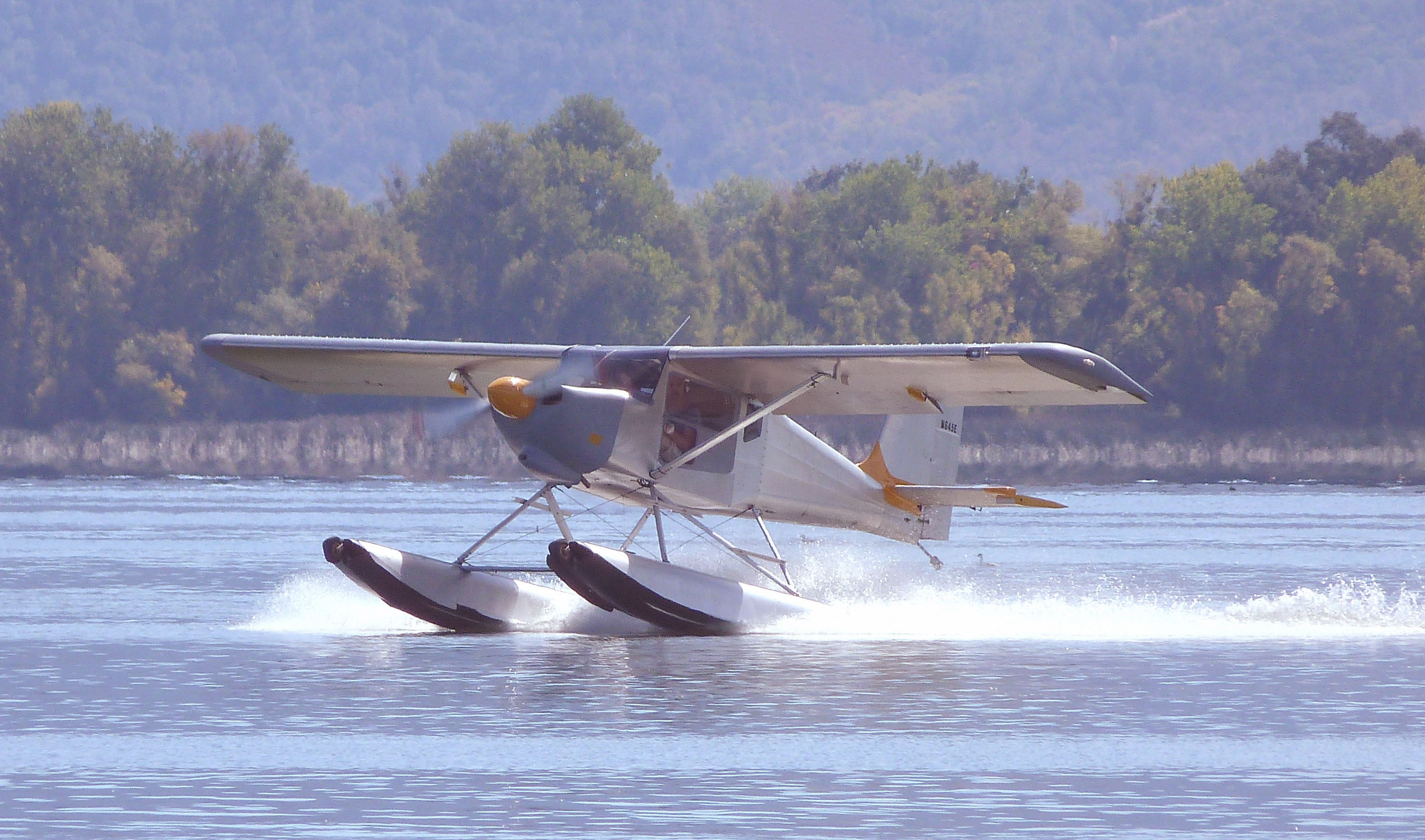

General information
- Type: Kit aircraft
- National origin: Canada
- Manufacturer: Murphy Aircraft
- Status: In production
- Number built: 25 (2011)

History
- Introduction date: April 1996
- Developed from: Murphy Rebel

The Murphy Elite is a Canadian light aircraft that was designed and is produced by Murphy Aircraft of Chilliwack, British Columbia. The aircraft is supplied as a kit for amateur construction.

When it was introduced in April 1996 it was originally known as the Rebel Elite.

== Design and development ==
The Elite was originally designed as a tricycle gear version of the Murphy Rebel, although it is now also offered with conventional landing gear as an option. It also incorporated some improvements over the Rebel, including a reinforced airframe, cantilever tailplane with a one-piece elevator, all-metal control surfaces, split configuration flaps, and upgraded wing attachment points and leading edges. This enabled the design to achieve a gross weight of 1,800 lb (816 kg), and to mount engines of up to 180 hp (134 kW). The Elite features a strut-braced high-wing, three seats, tricycle landing gear and a single engine in tractor configuration.

The aircraft is made from aluminum sheet. Its 30.3 ft (9.2 m) span wing is supported by single lift struts. The occupants are accommodated in an enclosed cabin of 44 in (111.8 cm) width, with doors for access and egress. With a standard empty weight of 1,100 lb (499 kg) and a gross weight of 1,800 lb (816 kg), the Elite has a useful load of 700 lb (318 kg). Acceptable power range is 115 to 180 hp (86 to 134 kW), and recommended engines include the 180 hp (134 kW) Lycoming O-360, 150 to 160 hp (112 to 119 kW) Lycoming O-320 and the 115 hp (86 kW) Lycoming O-235.

Construction time from the factory kit is estimated at 1400 hours. The Elite can be operated on wheels, including tundra tires, skis and floats.

== Specifications (Elite) ==
Data from Kitplanes and company

General characteristics

- Crew: one
- Capacity: two passengers
- Length: 22 ft 4 in (6.81 m)
- Wingspan: 30 ft 4 in (9.25 m)
- Wing area: 152 sq ft (14.1 m^{2})
- Airfoil: modified NACA 4415
- Empty weight: 1,100 lb (499 kg)
- Gross weight: 1,800 lb (816 kg)
- Fuel capacity: 44 U.S. gallons (170 L; 37 imp gal)
- Powerplant: 1 × Lycoming O-360 four cylinder, four-stroke, horizontally opposed aircraft engine, 180 hp (130 kW)

Performance

- Maximum speed: 145 mph (233 km/h, 126 kn)
- Cruise speed: 132 mph (212 km/h, 115 kn)
- Stall speed: 42 mph (68 km/h, 36 kn) with full flaps
- Never exceed speed: 157 mph (253 km/h, 136 kn)
- Range: 683 mi (1,099 km, 594 nmi)
- Endurance: 5.2 hours
- g limits: +5.7/-3.8 (ultimate limit)
- Rate of climb: 1,400 ft/min (7.1 m/s)
- Wing loading: 11.8 lb/sq ft (58 kg/m^{2})

Related development

- Murphy Rebel
