= Bowers Fly Baby =

American homebuilt aircraft

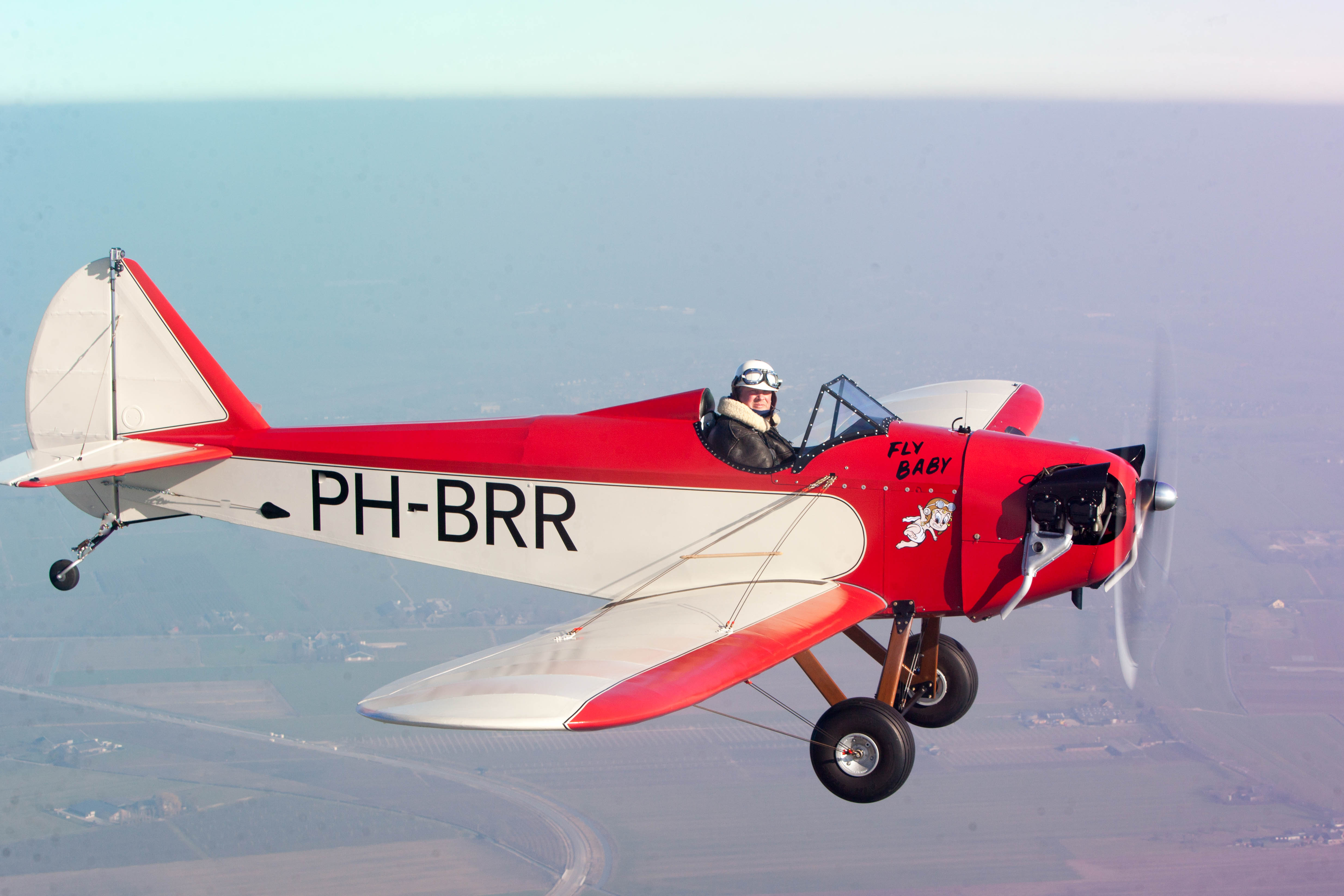

General information
- Type: Sport and personal aircraft
- Manufacturer: homebuilt aircraft
- Designer: Peter M. Bowers
- Number built: More than 500

History
- Manufactured: 1962 to present
- First flight: 1962
- Variant: Duane's Hangar Ultrababy

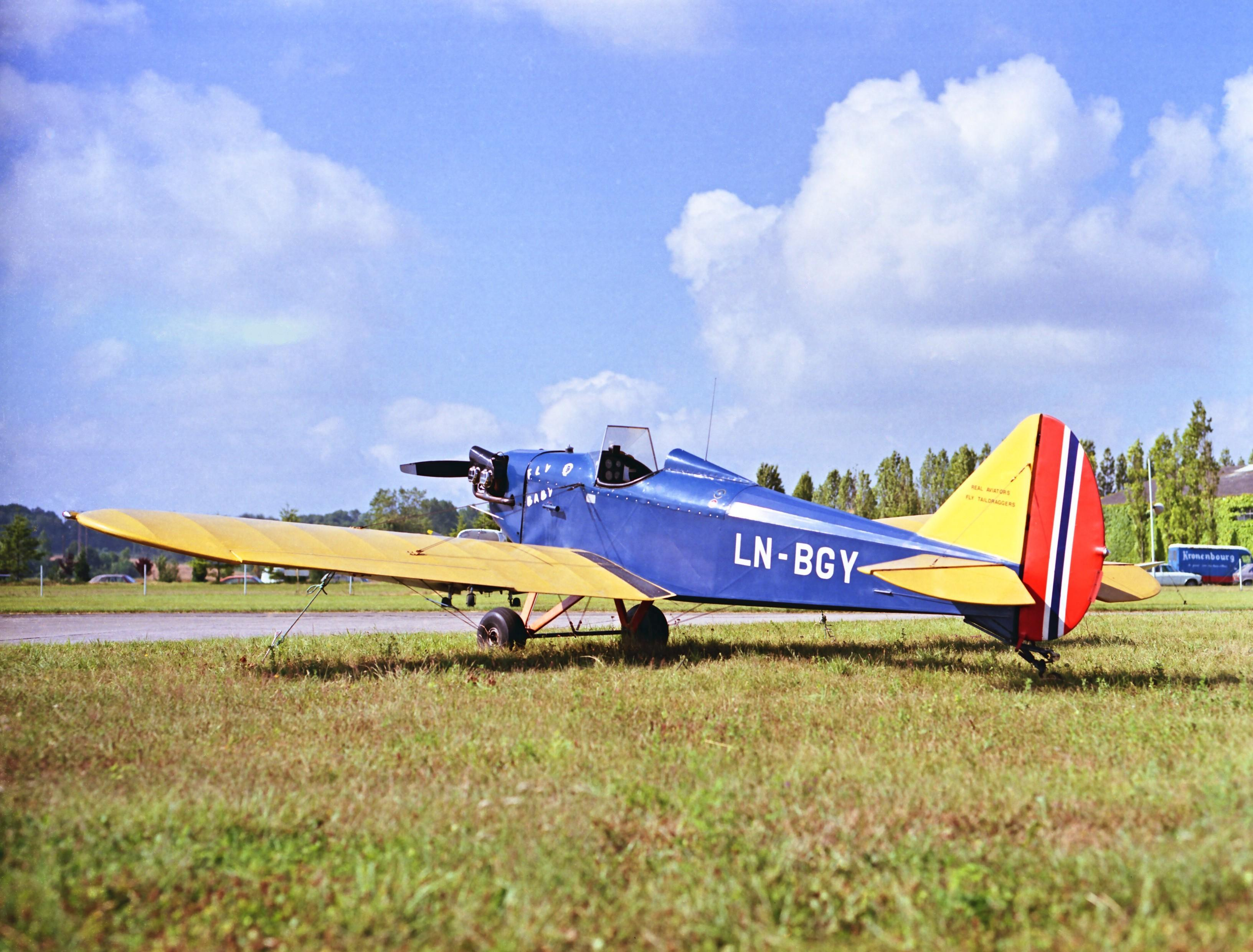
Fly Baby

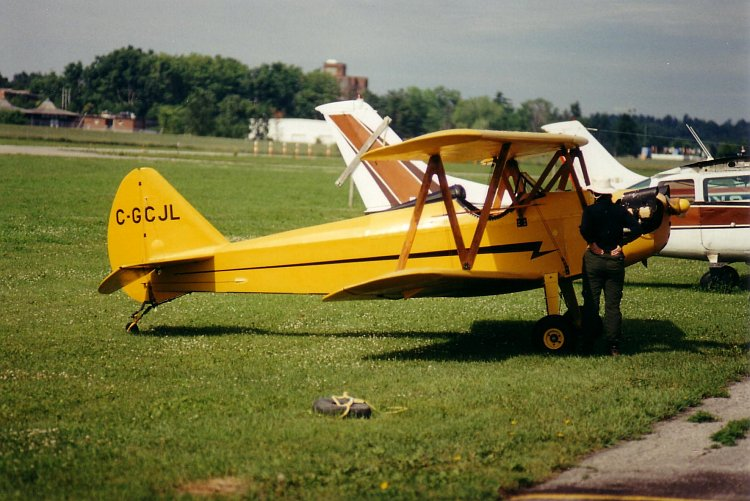
A Bowers Bi-Baby, this is the Fly Baby with the upper wing installed

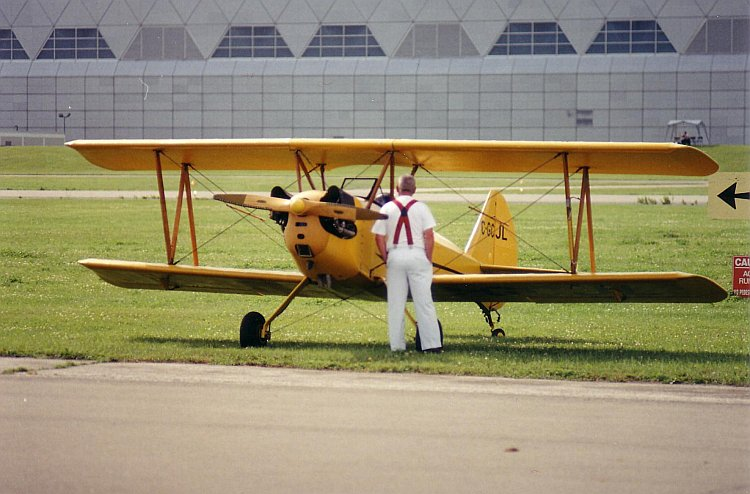
A Bowers Bi-Baby, front view

The Bowers Fly Baby is a homebuilt, single-seat, open-cockpit, wood and fabric low-wing monoplane that was designed by famed United States aircraft designer and Boeing historian, Peter M. Bowers.

== Development ==
The prototype Fly Baby first flew in 1962, becoming the winner of the Experimental Aircraft Association's 1962 design competition.

Variants include a biplane version called the Bowers Bi-Baby or Fly Baby 1-B, a floatplane version, and several dual-cockpit designs by various builders. Bowers also designed a side-by-side two-seat version he called Namu II, but few examples have been built.

Over 500 Fly Babies have been completed to date, with numerous still flying worldwide and an active network of builders and owners. It is built from plans and was designed to be constructed in a garage using only basic hand tools, by a person of average "home handyman" skill in 1962. The plans consist of over one hundred pages of typewritten instructions and dimensioned drawings. After Bowers' death in 2003 the plans were unavailable for a time. Starting in 2007 they were back on the market, sold by the Bowers family.

== Design ==
To win the 1962 Experimental Aircraft Association (EAA) Design Contest, Bowers designed the small plane to meet EAA's criteria for a low-cost, folding-wing airplane that was easy to build and fly, and could be towed or trailered.

The Fly Baby was designed to be a very simple aircraft. For example, the fuel gauge is a stiff wire attached to a float poking up through the gas cap (a common application in the 1930s and 1940s, as seen on Piper and Aeronca light aircraft). The structure is of aircraft-grade spruce and plywood (Bowers did not advocate skimping on the quality of structural wood), covered with doped aircraft fabric. Aileron controls are push-tube, elevator controls are a combination of push-tube and cable, the rudder is cable-controlled.

Although it is not intended for intense aerobatics, the Fly Baby can reportedly be flown through spins, simple loops, and barrel rolls.

The Fly Baby's wings fold up against the fuselage enabling it to be stored in a single-car garage or a car trailer. The wings can be folded or unfolded in about 15 minutes. The airplane was designed to be stored in a garage and towed to the airport on its own gear. In practice, most owners use a trailer or keep their Fly Baby hangared at an airport.

The landing gear is fixed and unsprung. The main landing gear struts are made of laminated wood with a steel axle. The only shock absorption comes from the tires themselves. (Some have been modified from, the original design, to use shock-absorbing, spring-steel landing gear legs.) Hydraulic wheel brakes are usually fitted.

The aircraft was designed to be powered by a 65-horsepower (48 kW) Continental A-65 piston engine taken from a Piper Cub. Engines of up to 100 horsepower (75 kW) have been fitted, including the Continental O-200 and converted Corvair automotive conversions.

While the instrumentation installed is up to the builder, most Fly Babys are equipped for visual flight rules (VFR) only. An electrical system is optional; many Fly Baby owners hand-prop the engine for starting, and use a handheld radio.

Some of the components used, such as the fuel tank and engine, were designed to be taken from the Piper Cub, which were cheap and plentiful in 1962. Even today, the total cost of construction can be under US$10,000.

== Variants ==
Bowers Bi-Baby
A Fly Baby can be converted to a biplane Bi-Baby in less than one hour by adding the struts and upper wing to the existing aircraft (if the fittings were built in) or it can be built as a biplane version from the start.

== Regulations ==
=== United States ===
In the United States of America, the FAA categorizes the Fly Baby as an Experimental Amateur-Built aircraft. It also fits the FAA's specifications for a Light Sport Aircraft and can be flown in the US by pilots holding a Recreational Pilot or Sport Pilot certificate.

=== Canada ===
In Canada the Fly Baby may be built as an amateur-built aircraft or as a basic ultra-light aeroplane. It may be flown with an Ultra-light Pilot Permit or higher aeroplane license.

== Specifications (Fly Baby) ==
Data from Plane and Pilot:1978 Aircraft Directory

General characteristics

- Crew: one pilot
- Length: 18 ft 10 in (5.74 m)
- Wingspan: 28 ft 0 in (8.54 m)
- Wing area: 120 sq ft (12.24 m^{2})
- Empty weight: 605 lb (274 kg)
- Max takeoff weight: 924 lb (419 kg)
- Powerplant: 1 × Continental C-85 flat-four engine, 85 hp (63 kW)

Performance

- Maximum speed: 120 mph (194 km/h, 100 kn)
- Cruise speed: 110 mph (178 km/h, 96 kn)
- Stall speed: 45 mph (73 km/h, 39 kn)
- Range: 300 mi (486 km, 260 nmi) at 8,000 ft (2,400 m)
- Rate of climb: 1,100 ft/min (5.6 m/s)
- Wing loading: 7.7 lb/sq ft (34.2 kg/m^{2})
- Power/mass: 10.8 lb/hp (6.56 kg/kW)

== See also ==
=== Comparable aircraft ===
- Ameri-Cana Eureka
- Murphy JDM-8
- Hanson Woodwind, Scott Ol' Ironsides - Construction methods based on Bower's Fly Baby plans.
