= Murphy Moose =

Canadian homebuilt light aircraft

Moose
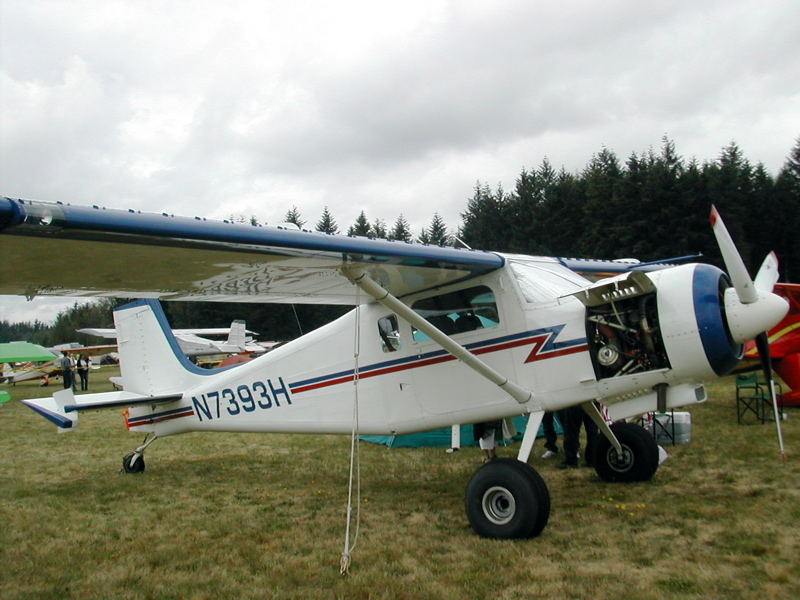
- A radial-equipped Murphy Moose

General information
- Type: Kit aircraft
- National origin: Canada
- Manufacturer: Murphy Aircraft
- Status: In production (2015)
- Number built: 120 (2011)

History
- Developed from: Murphy SR2500 Super Rebel

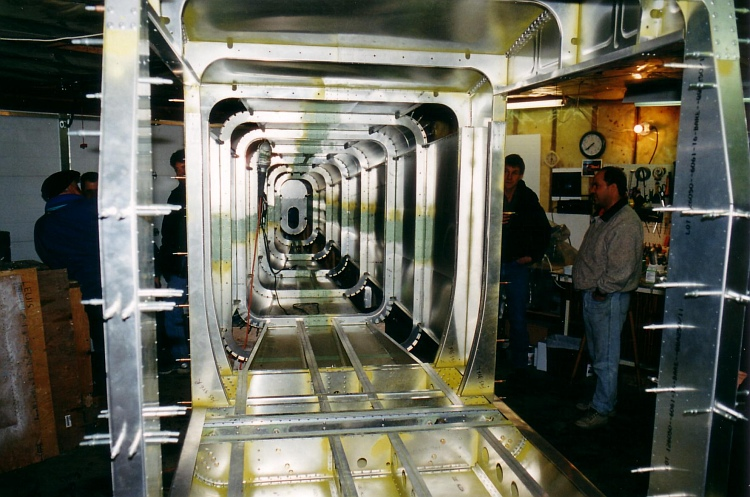
Inside of the tailcone of a Murphy Moose under construction, showing the semi-monocoque design

The Murphy Moose is a Canadian high-wing utility light aircraft produced in kit form by Murphy Aircraft of Chilliwack, British Columbia for amateur construction. The Moose can be purchased as a "quick-build" kit which comes partly pre-assembled.

Builders can choose whether to equip their aircraft with the 269 kW (360 hp) Russian-built Vedeneyev M14P nine-cylinder radial or the horizontally opposed 187 kW (250 hp) Lycoming O-540. Both engines allow the Moose to take off in roughly 180 m (600 ft). Several Moose are equipped with a Pratt & Whitney Canada PT6A-20 turboprop engine, others have installed a 460 hp (343 kW) General Motors LS3 V-8 engine.

== Specifications (Moose M-14P- tailwheel undercarriage) ==
Data from Jane's All The World's Aircraft 2003–2004

General characteristics

- Crew: one
- Capacity: five passengers
- Length: 7.01 m (23 ft 0 in)
- Wingspan: 10.97 m (36 ft 0 in)
- Height: 1.98 m (6 ft 6 in)
- Wing area: 16.91 m^{2} (182.0 sq ft)
- Empty weight: 816 kg (1,799 lb)
- Gross weight: 1,587 kg (3,499 lb)
- Powerplant: 1 × Vedeneyev M14P 9-cylinder radial engine, 265 kW (355 hp)

Performance

- Maximum speed: 282 km/h (175 mph, 152 kn)
- Cruise speed: 249 km/h (155 mph, 134 kn) (70% power)
- Stall speed: 81 km/h (50 mph, 44 kn) (flaps down)
- Never exceed speed: 304 km/h (189 mph, 164 kn)
- Range: 965 km (600 mi, 521 nmi) (standard fuel)
- Service ceiling: 4,575 m (15,010 ft)
- Rate of climb: 7.6 m/s (1,500 ft/min)

== See also ==
Related development

- Murphy SR2500 Super Rebel
- Murphy Yukon

Aircraft of comparable role, configuration, and era

- Bearhawk 5
- Cessna 206
- De Havilland Canada DHC-2 Beaver
- Max Holste Broussard
