= Junqua Ibis =

Ibis RJ03
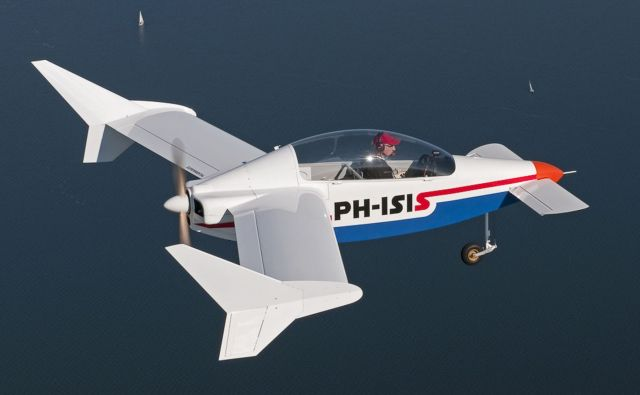
- Ibis PH-ISI

General information
- Type: Light homebuilt aircraft
- National origin: France
- Designer: Roger Junqua
- Number built: at least 11 flown by 2012

History
- First flight: 1991

The Junqua Ibis RJ03 is a wooden tandem seat pusher canard light aircraft, designed in France in the early 1990s for building at home. Eleven have flown and others remain under construction.

== Design and development ==
The first canard aircraft designed and built by Roger Junqua was the one-off Volucelle RJ02, first flown by the designer's son Jean-Claude in 1985. This, the first modern French canard, was used as a development vehicle to refine the final Ibis design. The Ibis first flew in 1991 and retains much in common with the Volucelle both in general layout and in some detail, though it has a more powerful Volkswagen engine. It is designed to be homebuilt from plans, not from a kit; its structure is entirely constructed from spruce or similar wood, covered with birch and Gaboon mahogany plywood.

The Ibis is a single engine pusher canard, with swept mainplanes carrying swept endplate fins and rudders. These rear wings have constant chord, so all the plywood ribs are identical for ease of construction, and are built around a constant cross section box spar. They are then filled with styrodur foam before the plywood skin is applied. There is no dihedral or washout. Full span flaperons provide roll control. The vertical surfaces are made in a similar way and extend both above and below the wing, incorporating rudders for yaw control. The canard fore wing is again similarly made but is unswept; it has constant chord with rounded tips and has no dihedral or washout. It carries slotted elevators for pitch control.

The fuselage of the Ibis is built around four wooden longerons and plywood covered, with single curvature sides and bottom. Pilot and passenger are seated in tandem under a long, single-piece, Junqua-supplied canopy, with the rear seat at the leading edge root of the mainplane; there is storage space behind the passenger's seat. The pusher engine is close to the trailing edge, driving a two blade propeller. A variety of ungeared flat four engines in the 45-60 kW (60-80 hp) can be used; Ibis have flown with Volkswagen 1835 and 1870 cc, Limbach L2000 and Jabiru 2200 motors. The Ibis has a fixed tricycle undercarriage with mainwheels, which may be spatted, mounted from the fuselage on laminated plywood legs. The nosewheel has a rocker type rubber shock absorber and is steerable via the rudder pedals.

== Operational history ==
Eleven Ibis had been built and flown by 2012, eight in France and one each in the Netherlands, Slovenia and the USA. 41 others remain under construction worldwide, six of which appear on the French civil aircraft register.

== Variants ==
Junqua Volucelle RJ-02
A proof of concept and development vehicle for the Junqua Ibis RJ-03. Very similar in layout and construction to the Ibis, differing primarily in power-plant.
Junqua Ibis RJ-03
The home-built aircraft developed from the Volucelle RJ-02, fitted with a 60 hp (45 kW) Volkswagen air-cooled engine or an 85 hp (63 kW) Jabiru 2200.

== Specifications (60 hp Volkswagen engine) ==
Data from

General characteristics

- Capacity: 2
- Length: 4.90 m (16 ft 1 in)
- Wingspan: 6.30 m (20 ft 8 in)
- Height: 1.76 m (5 ft 9 in)
- Empty weight: 260 kg (573 lb)
- Max takeoff weight: 470 kg (1,036 lb)
- Fuel capacity: 60 L (13 Imp gal, 16 US gal)
- Powerplant: 1 × Volkswagen 1835 cc four cylinder, horizontally opposed four stroke engine, 45 kW (60 hp)
- Propellers: 2-bladed

Performance

- Maximum speed: 260 km/h (160 mph, 140 kn)
- Cruise speed: 200 km/h (120 mph, 110 kn) at 65% power
- Stall speed: 95 km/h (59 mph, 51 kn)
- Range: 900 km (560 mi, 490 nmi) at 180 km/h (112 mph)
- g limits: +4.5/-3.0
- Rate of climb: 3.6 m/s (700 ft/min)
