= Murphy Maverick =

Canadian homebuilt light aircraft

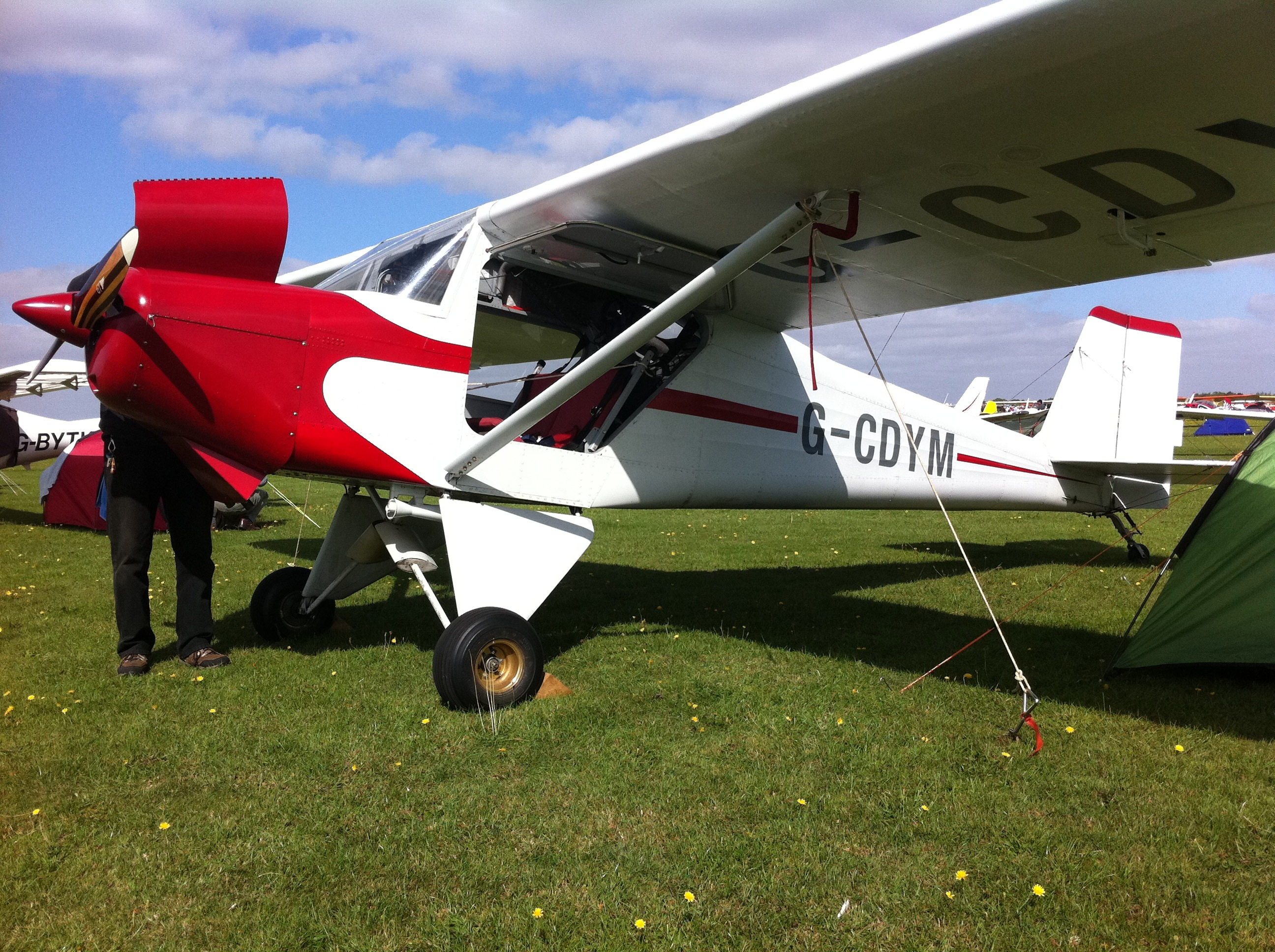

General information
- Type: Two-seat high-wing ultralight
- National origin: Canada
- Manufacturer: Murphy Aircraft
- Status: In production (2011)
- Number built: 105 (2011)

History
- Introduction date: 1993

The Murphy Maverick is a Canadian two-seat fixed-wing ultralight monoplane designed by Murphy Aircraft of British Columbia. The type is sold as a kit for home construction or as a complete ready-to-fly aircraft.

== Development ==
Designed as a smaller version of the Rebel, the Maverick is an all-metal high-wing braced monoplane with two side-by-side seats and a tailwheel landing gear. The aircraft was designed around the Rotax 503 powerplant, with the goal of producing an economical ultralight trainer. As a homebuilt it can also be fitted with a number of different piston engines including the HKS 700, Rotax 582 and Jabiru 2200.

The aircraft is mainly built from sheet aluminium, with the tail and rear sections of the wings fabric covered to save weight. The wings are constructed using a "D" cell, with stamped ribs and a single wing strut. The standard wing span on the Maverick is 29 ft 6 in (8.99 m), but an optional wing extension is available to increase the wingspan to reduce the wing loading.

The standard landing gear is of a taildragger configuration and bungee suspended, with sprung steel main gear as an option. Additional options include 24 US gal (91 L) wing-mounted fuel tanks and fittings for installing floats.

== Variants ==
Phoenix Aircraft Maverick PA
Licensed built version constructed by Phoenix Aircraft of Munich, Germany for the European market. This version incorporates different seats, plus electric flaps and trim.

== Specifications (Murphy Maverick) ==
Data from World Directory of Leisure Aviation & Cliche

General characteristics

- Crew: 1
- Capacity: 1 passenger
- Length: 20 ft 8 in (6.30 m)
- Wingspan: 29 ft 6 in (9.0 m)
- Wing area: 147.5 sq ft (13.70 m^{2})
- Empty weight: 468 lb (212.5 kg)
- Powerplant: 1 × Jabiru 2200 piston engine, 80 hp (60 kW)

Performance

- Maximum speed: 109 mph (176 km/h, 95 kn)
- Cruise speed: 85 mph (136 km/h, 73 kn)
- Minimum control speed: 32 mph (52 km/h, 28 kn)
- Range: 280 mi (450 km, 240 nmi)
- Service ceiling: 13,000 ft (4,000 m)
- g limits: +5.7/-3.8
