= Murphy Aircraft =

Canadian homebuilt light aircraft manufacturer

Murphy Aircraft Manufacturing Limited
- Industry: manufacturing
- Founded: 1984
- Founder: Darryl Murphy
- Defunct: 2026
- Headquarters: 2-8155 Aitken Rd Chilliwack B.C. V2R4H5, Chilliwack, British Columbia, Canada
- Key people: Managing director: Jensen Li
- Products: Kit aircraft
- Owner: Duofu International Holding Group
- Website: www.murphyair.com

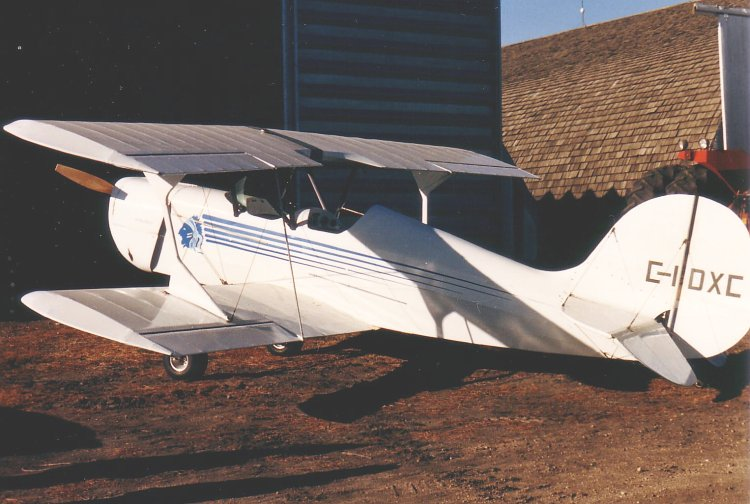
Murphy Aircraft's first commercial product was the Renegade II biplane.

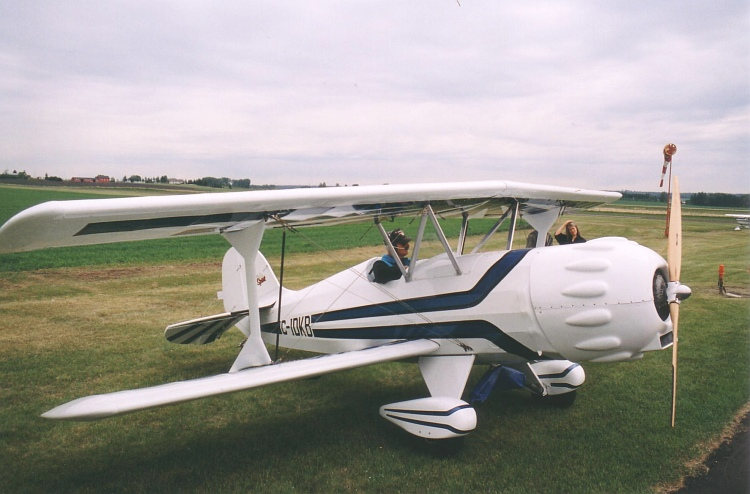
Murphy Aircraft Renegade Spirit.

Murphy Aircraft Manufacturing Limited was a manufacturer of civil general aviation kits for amateur construction currently owned by China-headquartered Duofu Group. The company was founded in 1985 by Darryl Murphy and was located in Chilliwack, British Columbia, Canada.

== History ==
The company was started as the result of a hunting accident. Darryl Murphy was a mechanical engineering technologist who designed and built a rigid wing hang glider in 1978 as a school project at the Saskatchewan Institute of Applied Science and Technology in Saskatoon, Saskatchewan. In 1984 Murphy was in a non-aviation accident that left him hospitalized for four months. During his recovery time he decided to design a biplane to fit into the then-new Canadian ultralight category. The aircraft was a single-seat model and was intended as a one-off aircraft for his own use, with no production intentions. Murphy named it the Renegade.

After taking the Renegade to a number of fly-ins and other aviation events, Murphy was encouraged by the positive response it received and by the number of people who asked him to build one for them. In 1985 Murphy quit his job and started Murphy Aviation (later renamed Murphy Aircraft Manufacturing), with his brother Bryan and located the company in Chilliwack, British Columbia.

The original Renegade design was turned into a two-seater by relocating the fuel tank from the centre fuselage to the upper wing, installing a second seat and designating it the Renegade II. Initial sales were disappointing as only one kit was sold in the first six months. Sales improved greatly once the aviation press began reviewing the aircraft. By 1986 the company had a backlog of orders, including many from outside North America. Murphy displayed the Renegade at the EAA Convention, Oshkosh and returned to Chilliwack with a substantial order book. During 1989 sales totalled 129 Renegade IIs.

In May 1987 a new version of the basic Renegade design first flew. Named the Renegade Spirit it added a radial engine-style round cowling and a 64 hp (48 kW) Rotax 532 and later the Rotax 582 engine.

In September 2008, as a result of restructuring due to the early 2000s recession, Murphy Aircraft split off their sales functions to a new company, Patterson AeroSales, headed by former Murphy sales representative Bob Patterson. Murphy Aircraft continues to concentrate on designing and manufacturing kit aircraft while Patterson handles "show appearances, advertising materials, promotions and general sales responsibilities". Murphy Aircraft President Darryl Murphy also explained that the company will only manufacture kits in batches once sufficient numbers of orders have been accumulated to justify a production run and that standard aircraft hardware parts, like rivets and bolts would be shipped directly from the suppliers to customers to save costs.

On 9 January 2014 the company issued a press release indicating that Darryl Murphy was retiring and wished to sell the company, indicating he expected to receive in the "$2.5 to $4 million range, depending on how much of the manufacturing machinery the buyer wants".

On 22 January 2016 Murphy Aircraft announced that it has begun the process to put the Murphy Rebel into the light-sport aircraft category.

The company unveiled a new Darryl Murphy design at AirVenture in July 2016, the Murphy Radical, which incorporates bicycle carriers on the wings.

In 2022, Murphy Aircraft was acquired by Beijing-based Duofu International Holding Group, one of the top 25 Chinese conglomerates, which has subsidiaries in the fields of investment, manufacturing, mining, real estate, culture, tourism, international trade and aviation manufacturing. The company appointed Jensen Li as the managing director.

The newly acquired company halted kit production while rewriting the kit documentation using CAD/CAM computerization and also re-working the kits to speed up assembly time with improved pre-drilling. Kit production was expected to resume later in 2023, with a reduced offering of only three designs, the Murphy Moose, Radical and Rebel.

Hu Xingrong, owner of Duofu, was arrested for bank fraud in July 2026. Financial strain at Murphy Aircraft began to appear, with the website and phones down, and the company failed to pay rent for its facilities. The company closed in 2026, with its assets sold at auction in October 2026.

== Aircraft ==
Product list and details (date information from Murphy)
Aircraft	Description	Seats	Launch date	1st flight	1st delivery	Number built
Murphy Elite	propeller aircraft/float plane	2
Murphy Maverick	propeller aircraft/ultralight/LSA	2
Murphy Moose (SR3500)	utility monoplane	2~6
Murphy Rebel	propeller aircraft/float plane/LSA	2+1		May 1990	Feb 1991
Murphy SR2500 Super Rebel
Murphy Renegade	biplane/LSA	2
Murphy Yukon	propeller aircraft	4	2007	2007	2012	3
Murphy JDM-8	propeller acrobatic/ultralight	1				prototype only
Murphy Radical	propeller STOL	4	2016	2016	2017	5 (2023)
