= Murphy Super Rebel =

SR2500 Super Rebel
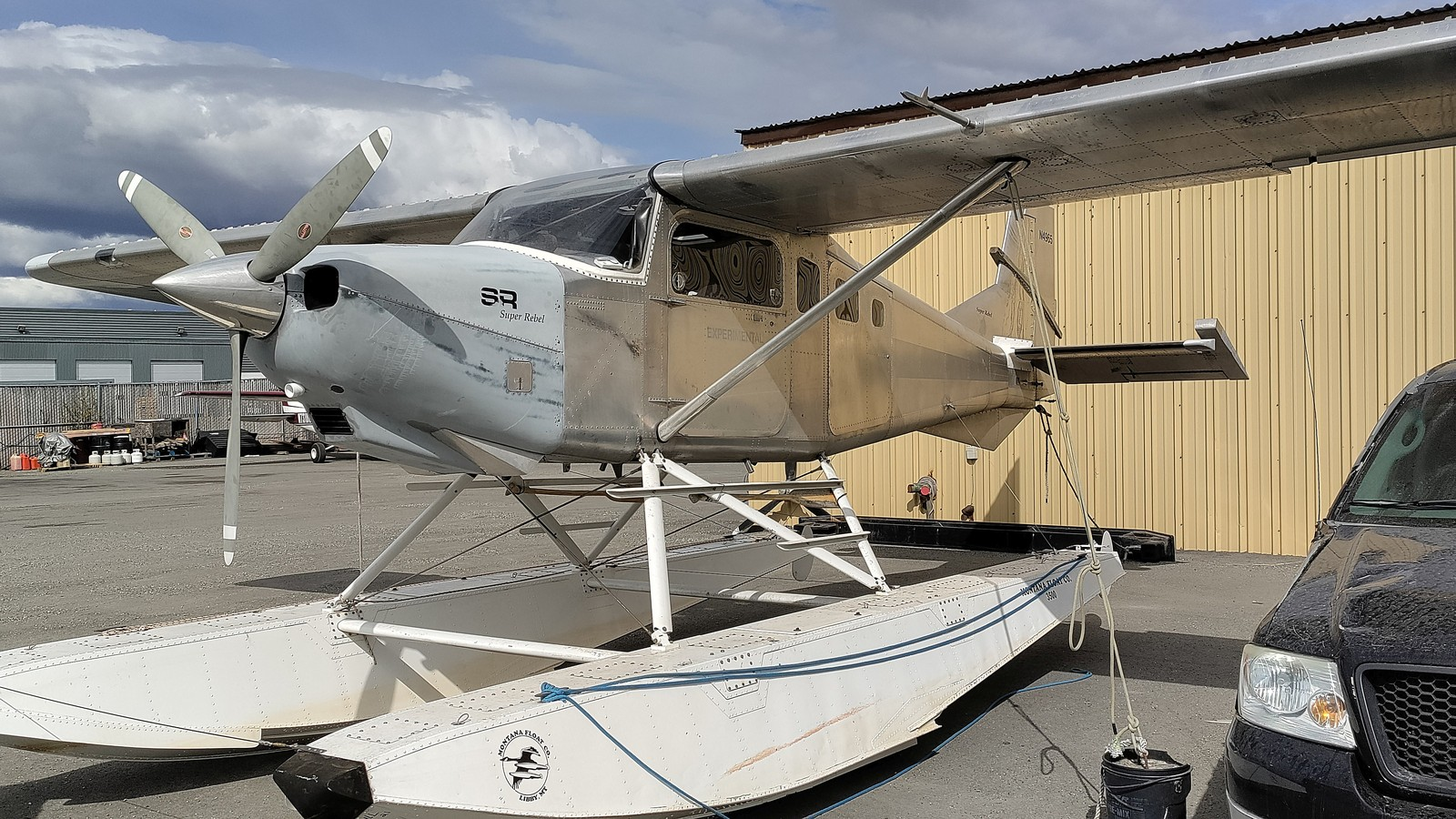
- Murphy SR2500 Super Rebel floatplane

General information
- Type: Four-seat high-wing homebuilt aircraft
- National origin: Canada
- Manufacturer: Murphy Aircraft
- Status: Production of kits completed

History
- First flight: November 1995

The Murphy SR2500 Super Rebel is a Canadian four-seat monoplane designed by Murphy Aircraft of British Columbia. The type was sold as a kit for home construction, but production ended by 2008.

== Design and development ==
Designed as a larger four-seat version of the Rebel, the Super Rebel is an all-metal high-wing braced monoplane with two rows of side-by-side seats for four. The prototype first flew in November 1995 and was powered by a 250 hp (190 kW) Lycoming O-540-4A5 driving a two-bladed constant-speed propeller. The prototype had a tricycle landing gear but the standard model (SR2500TD) has a tailwheel landing gear. The rear bench seat can be removed to hold luggage and the Super Rebel has a separate baggage door on the port side behind the passenger door. The aircraft is designed for any engine between 134 and 186 kW (180 to 250 hp) and also has larger fuel tanks as an option (increasing range to 1350 km (839 miles).

== Variants ==
SR2500 Super Rebel
Powered by a 250 hp (190 kW) Lycoming O-540-4A5, tricycle undercarriage.
SR2500TD Super Rebel;
As for the SR2500 with taildragger undercarriage
SR3500 Super Rebel
Powered by a 360 hp (270 kW) Vedeneyev M14P

== Specifications (with O-540 engine) ==
Data from

General characteristics

- Crew: 1
- Capacity: 3 passengers
- Length: 7.32 m (24 ft 0 in)
- Wingspan: 10.97 m (36 ft 0 in)
- Height: 2.67 m (8 ft 9 in)
- Wing area: 16.91 m^{2} (182 sq ft)
- Empty weight: 771 kg (1,700 lb)
- Gross weight: 1,361 kg (3,000 lb)
- Powerplant: 1 × Lycoming O-540-4A5 piston engine , 186 kW (250 hp)

Performance

- Maximum speed: 284 km/h (177 mph, 154 kn)
- Cruise speed: 233 km/h (145 mph, 126 kn)
- Range: 997 km (620 mi, 540 nmi)
- Endurance: 4 hours 15 minutes
- Service ceiling: 4,575 m (15,000 ft)
- Rate of climb: 5.6 m/s (1,100 ft/min)
