= Tundra tire =

Type of aircraft tire

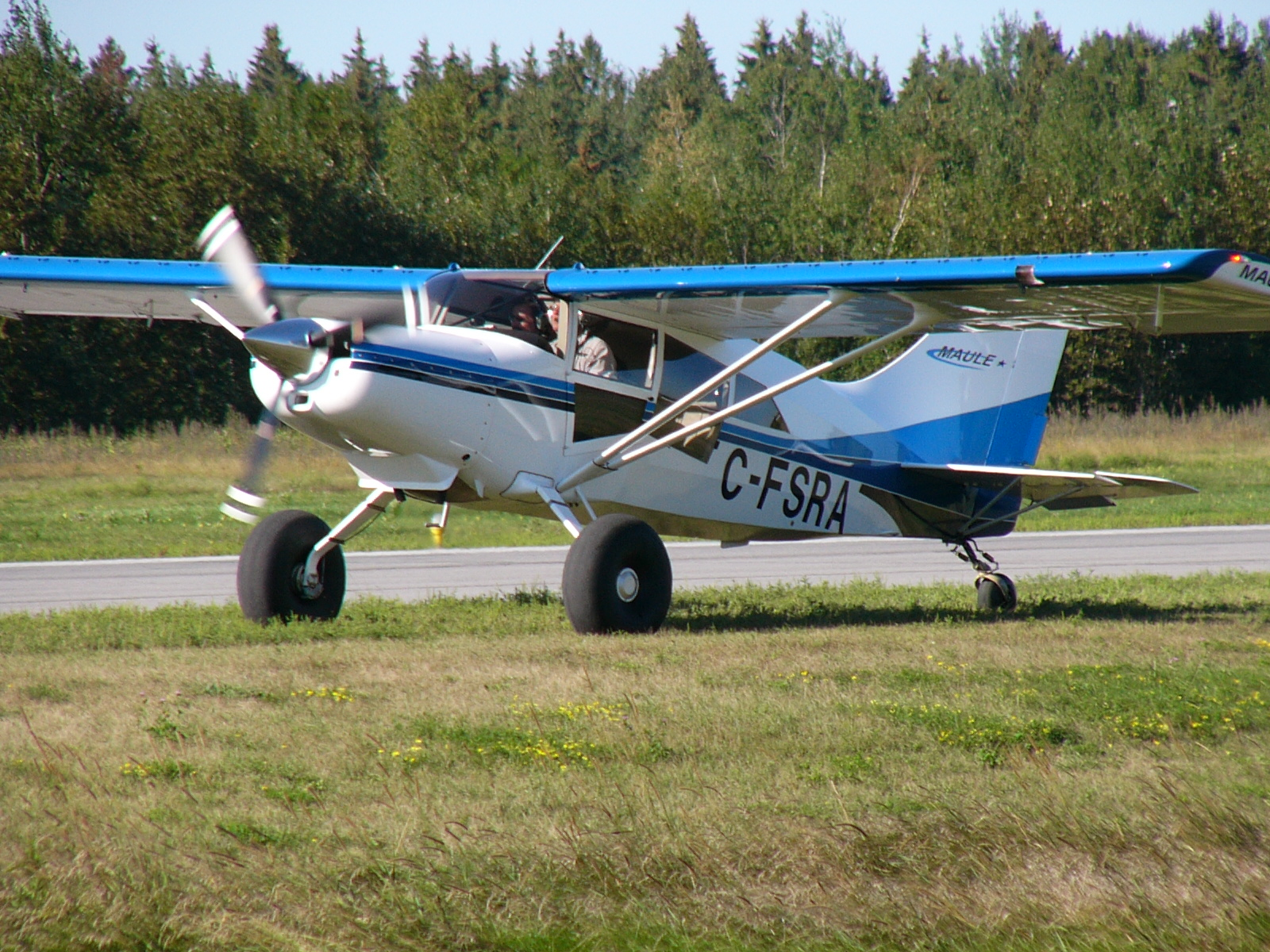
Maule M-7-235C on bushwheel-style tundra tires

A tundra tire (UK: tundra tyre) is a large low-pressure tire used on light aircraft to allow operations on rough terrain.

A common variant of tundra tire is the bushwheel brand. These tires include an integral inner tube with the valve manufactured into the side-wall, allowing the tire to operate at very low pressures without risking shearing-off the valve stem and causing a flat tire. Low-pressure tires provide greater cushioning and enable aircraft to land on rough surfaces, unsuitable for normal tires. Bushwheels are a common modification for backcountry aircraft.

== History ==
The tundra-style tire has been independently invented at different times and places. In North America its post-World War II invention is credited to Canadian Welland Phipps, potentially inspired by the Goodyear Tire & Rubber Company's pre-World War II development of their own, similar low-pressure "airwheel" as a complete wheel-rim and tire set — said to be of the "Musselman" type from U.S. patent 1,877,360, for its original inventor, Alvin J. Musselman — which was introduced to the American public in the late summer of 1929, and becoming available in the United Kingdom by 1930. It was initially offered by Goodyear in fully inflated diameters up to 46 inches (120 cm), with a 30-inch (76 cm) diameter in Goodyear's lineup having similar dimensions as seen in the British Flight magazine announcement, to a currently available size of tundra tire.

Nearly twenty years after the original Musselman design appeared on the market, Phipps designed and constructed his own balloon tires in the period after the Second World War and fitted them to a Piper PA-18 Super Cub. Phipps then went on to provide air transportation to much of the Canadian high arctic region. He later established his own airline, Atlas Aviation, which operated a fleet of De Havilland Canada DHC-6 Twin Otters on balloon tires. Using the tires, Atlas's DHC-6s established airline service to such remote communities as Resolute, Nunavut and Grise Fiord, Nunavut.

== Airworthiness issues ==
In the United States and particularly in Alaska, tundra tires of various designs were often installed under local field approvals by Federal Aviation Administration inspectors. These approvals were usually granted on the basis of visual inspections and did not include flight testing. After a number of accidents with aircraft equipped with tundra tires, culminating with a large number in the fall of 1994, the National Transportation Safety Board identified that the tundra tires were connected with the accidents. Starting in April 1995 the FAA carried out flight test experiments to determine whether the tundra tires were a contributing factor.

The tests used a Piper PA-18-150 Super Cub equipped in sequence with five different sets of tires, including standard factory tires and tundra tires up to 35 in (89 cm) diameter. The PA-18 was operated at different weights and center-of-gravity positions.

The testing on the ground revealed that the larger the tire, the more restricted the forward visibility on the ground, that there was a nose-down pitching moment when the tires contacted the ground on landing, particularly on a wheel landing, and that tundra tire-equipped aircraft have substantially poorer ground handling characteristics on pavement. In the air, the use of tundra tires reduced top speed, rate of climb, angle of climb, range, useful load and stall warning buffet margins.

The tests did not indicate that tundra tires raise stall speed, but did find that, due to increased drag in turns, the aircraft's nose tends to drop excessively with an increase in bank angle. If the pilot counteracts this tendency with rudder and stalls the aircraft, the airplane will rapidly enter a spin.

Alaska bush pilots disputed the experimental findings, but, as a result of these experiments the FAA required that all installed tires be subject to a Technical Standard Order or Parts Manufacturer Approval, have been flight-tested and subject to a weight and balance report, determining an acceptable flight envelope. The FAA also limited tundra tires to 35 in (89 cm) in diameter, eleven inches (28 cm) short of the largest original Goodyear "airwheel" tire size available in 1930.

== Operators ==
Until the end of the 20th century, tundra tires were mostly used by bush operators flying in remote areas. In the early part of the 21st century many sales of tundra tires have been to recreational pilots. Bill Duncan, president of Alaskan Bushwheels a tundra tire manufacturer explains:

"It's the baby boomers. Here you have a group of people that lost their shirts in the stock market after 9/11 but still have disposable income and are tired of sitting in the office watching the clock. They’ve figured out that a light utility aircraft—a Super Cub, a Husky, a Maule or a Scout, to name the top four, will keep its value over time and may even appreciate in value. And they want to get outside and play."

== Benefits ==
Larger tundra tires provide a number of benefits to light aircraft in general and to tailwheel aircraft in particular:

- Larger footprint and increased flotation, enabling operation from softer surfaces without sinking into the ground
- Increased clearance between the propeller and the ground, reducing the likelihood of propeller damage from ground contact and wear from foliage and loose soil
- Some designs enable operation with extremely low tire pressures without the risk of damaging valve stems

Charles McDowell, an Aviat Husky pilot stated:

There's the coolness factor, plus it's nice to have a little more capability than you may need...We want a rugged plane because it makes us feel a little more independent from the infrastructure.

== Drawbacks ==
- Larger tire size creates additional drag, resulting in slower cruise speeds and increased fuel consumption
- Higher cost, with individual tires from Alaskan Bushwheels ranging from $2,000 to over $3,000
- Many tundra tire types optimized for operation from soft surfaces such as grass and dirt wear out more quickly when operated on concrete and hard surfaces
