= Murphy Rebel =

Canadian lightweight aircraft

Rebel
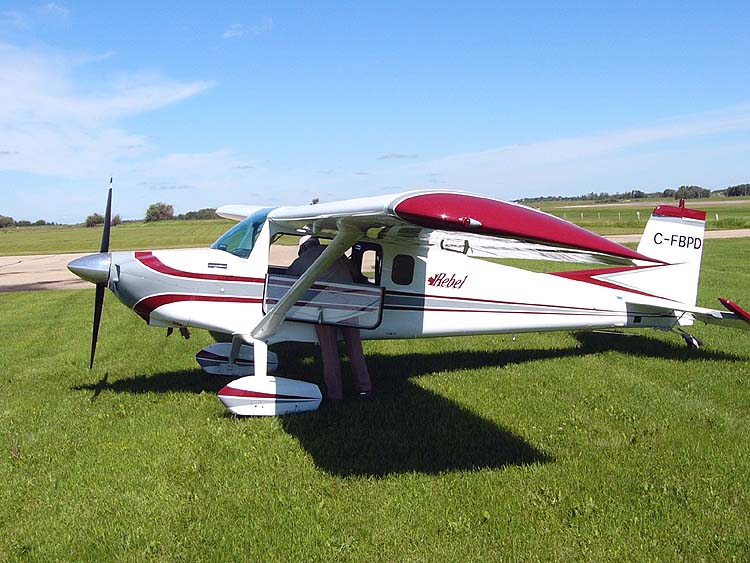
- Murphy Rebel on wheels

General information
- Type: amateur-built airplane
- Manufacturer: Murphy Aircraft
- Status: In production (2015)
- Number built: 610 (2011)

History
- First flight: 1990
- Variant: Murphy Elite

The Murphy Rebel is a two- or three-seat, strut braced, high wing, taildragger monoplane which is sold in kit form by Murphy Aircraft in Chilliwack, British Columbia, Canada.

== Development ==
The Rebel is a STOL aircraft and was designed to be a personal-use bush plane. It can operate from short, unimproved airstrips and can carry a useful load of up to 750 lbs.

The aircraft features a strut-braced high-wing, a two or three seat enclosed cabin accessed via doors, fixed conventional landing gear and a single engine in tractor configuration. The aircraft is made from sheet aluminum. Its 30.0 ft (9.1 m) span wing employs a NACA 4415 mod airfoil, has an area of 149 sq ft (13.8 m^{2}) and is equipped with flaps.

The recommended engines for the Rebel are the 160 hp (120 kW) Lycoming O-320, the 116 hp (87 kW) Lycoming O-235 and the 80 hp (60 kW) Rotax 912, although Bayerl et al. note that the aircraft does not perform well with less than 100 hp (75 kW).

== Specifications (Rebel) ==
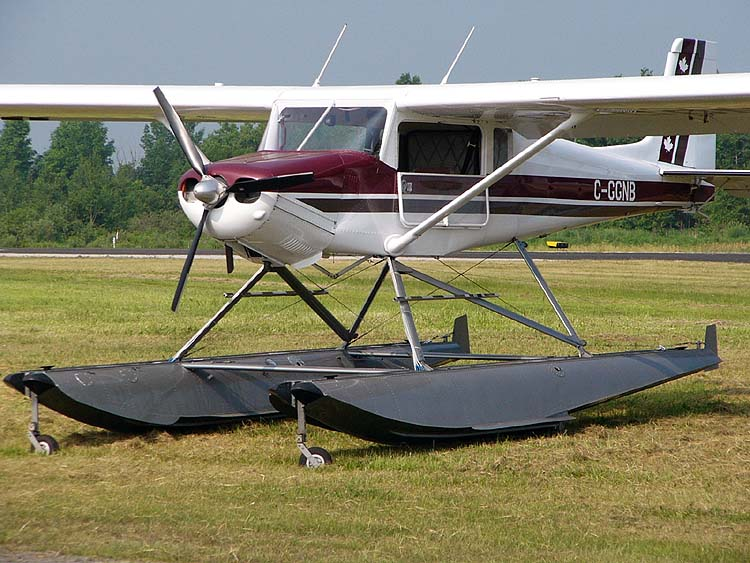
Murphy Rebel on amphibious floats

Data from Murphy Rebel Website

General characteristics

- Crew: One
- Capacity: one or two passengers
- Length: 21 ft 4 in (6.6 m)
- Wingspan: 30 ft 0 in (9.2 m)
- Wing area: 150 sq ft (14 m^{2})
- Airfoil: NACA 4415 mod
- Empty weight: 950 lb (431 kg)
- Gross weight: 1,650 lb (748 kg)
- Powerplant: × Lycoming O-320 , 160 hp (120 kW)

Performance

- Maximum speed: 140 mph (227 km/h, 120 kn)
- Cruise speed: 120 mph (190 km/h, 100 kn)
- Range: 733 mi (1,180 km, 637 nmi)
- Endurance: 6.1 hours

== Similar aircraft ==
- Aviat Husky
- American Champion Citabria and Scout
- Bede BD-4
- Capella XS
- Fisher Dakota Hawk
- Murphy Elite
- Murphy Maverick
- Piper Cub
- ULBI Wild Thing
