= Homebuilt aircraft =

Aircraft constructed by amateurs

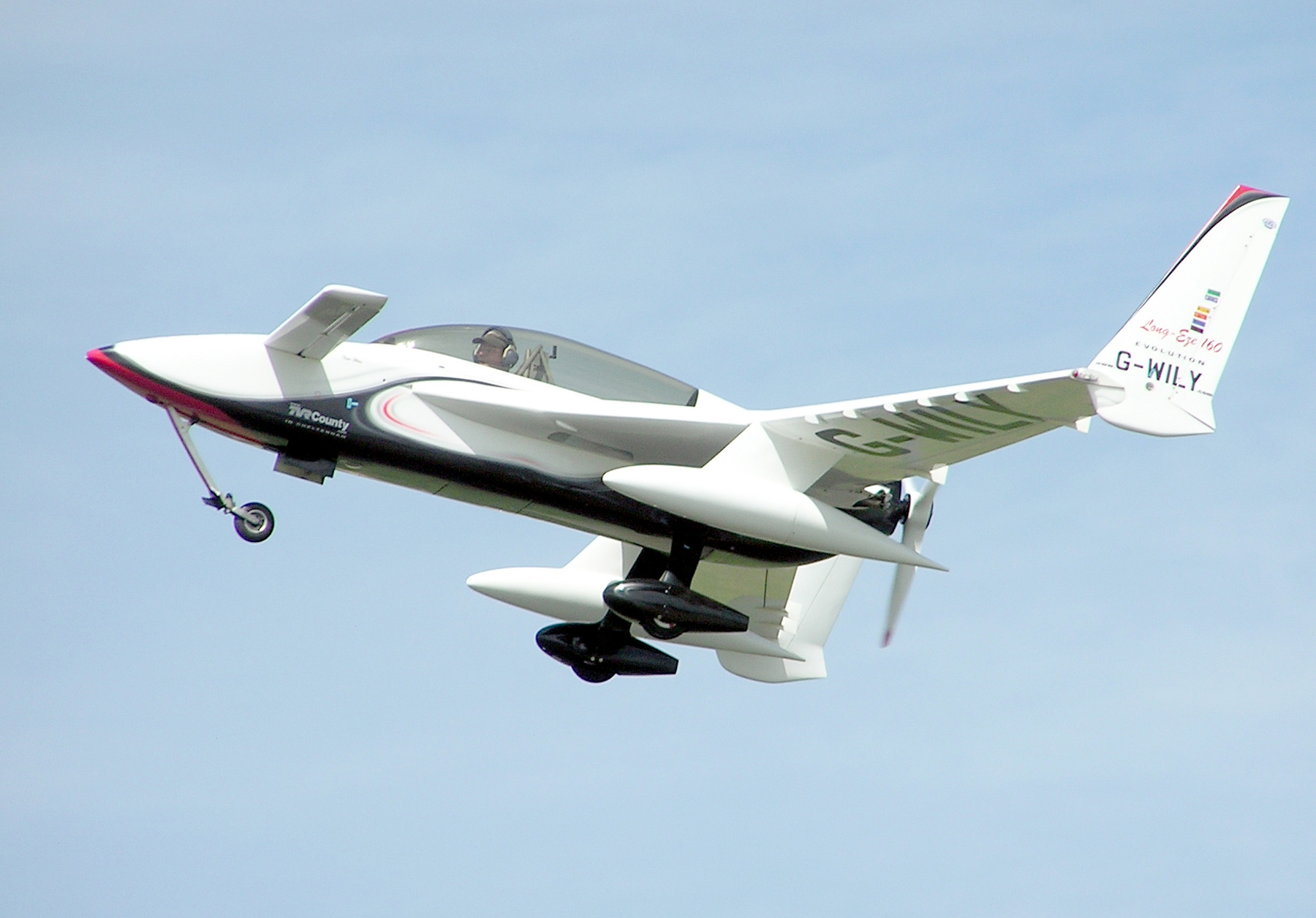
A Rutan Long-EZ homebuilt in 1984 in England

Homebuilt aircraft, also known as amateur-built aircraft or kit planes, are constructed by persons for whom this is not a professional activity. These aircraft may be constructed from "scratch", from plans, or from assembly kits.

== Overview ==
In the United States, Brazil, Australia, New Zealand and South Africa, homebuilt aircraft may be licensed Experimental under FAA or similar local regulations. With some limitations, the builder(s) of the aircraft must have done it for their own education and recreation rather than for profit. In the U.S., the primary builder can also apply for a repairman's certificate for that airframe. The repairman's certificate allows the holder to perform and sign off on most of the maintenance, repairs, and inspections themselves.

Alberto Santos-Dumont was the first to offer construction plans for free, publishing drawings of his Demoiselle in the June 1910 edition of Popular Mechanics. The first aircraft to be offered for sale as plans, rather than a completed airframe, was the Baby Ace in the late 1920s.

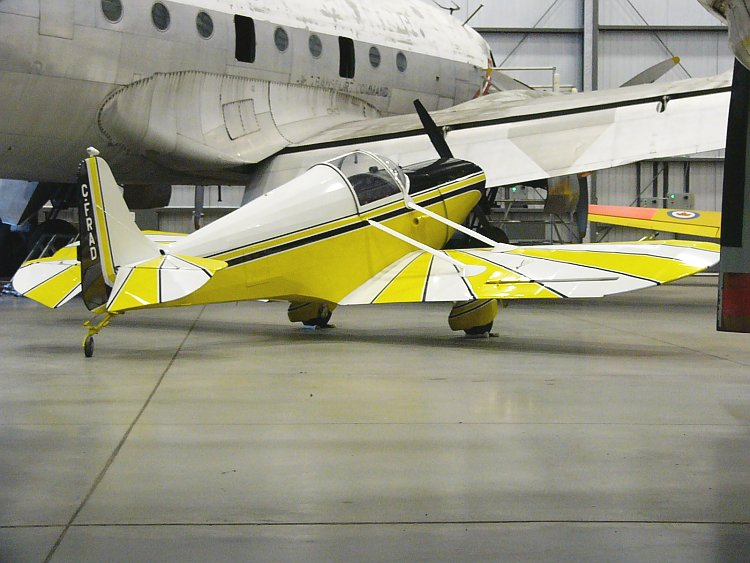
Canada's first homebuilt aircraft, Stitts SA-3A Playboy CF-RAD, first flown in 1955, seen in the Canada Aviation and Space Museum.

Homebuilt aircraft gained popularity in the U.S. in 1924 with the start of the National Air Races, held in Dayton, Ohio. These races required aircraft with useful loads of 150 lb (68 kg) and engines of 80 cubic inches or less and as a consequence of the class limitations most were amateur-built. The years after Charles Lindbergh's transatlantic flight brought a peak of interest between 1929 and 1933. During this period many aircraft designers, builders and pilots were self-taught and the high accident rate brought public condemnation and increasing regulation to amateur building. The resulting federal standards on design, engineering, stress analysis, use of aircraft-quality hardware and testing of aircraft brought an end to amateur building except in some specialized areas, such as racing. In 1946 Goodyear restarted the National Air Races, including a class for aircraft powered by 200 cubic inch and smaller engines. The midget racer class spread nationally in the U.S. and this led to calls for acceptable standards to allow recreational use of amateur-built aircraft. By the mid-1950s both the U.S. and Canada once again allowed amateur-built aircraft to specified standards and limitations.

Homebuilt aircraft are generally small, one to four-seat sportsplanes which employ simple methods of construction. Fabric-covered wood or metal frames and plywood are common in the aircraft structure, but increasingly, fiberglass and other composites as well as full aluminum construction techniques are being used, techniques first pioneered by Hugo Junkers as far back as the late World War I era. Engines are most often the same as, or similar to, the engines used in certified aircraft (such as Lycoming, Continental, Rotax, and Jabiru). A minority of homebuilts use converted automobile engines, with Volkswagen air-cooled flat-4s, Subaru-based liquid-cooled engines, Mazda Wankel and Chevrolet Corvair six-cylinder engines being most common. The use of automotive engines helps to reduce costs, but many builders prefer dedicated aircraft engines, which are perceived to have better performance and reliability. Other engines that have been used include chainsaw and motorcycle engines.

A combination of cost and litigation, especially in the mid-1980s era, discouraged general aviation manufacturers from introducing new designs and led to homebuilts outselling factory-built aircraft by five to one.

== History ==
The history of amateur-built aircraft can be traced to the beginning of aviation. Even if the Wright brothers, Clément Ader, and their successors had commercial objectives in mind, the first aircraft were constructed by passionate enthusiasts whose goal was to fly.

=== Early years ===
Aviation took a leap forward with the industrialization that accompanied World War I. In the post-war period, manufacturers needed to find new markets and introduced models designed for tourism. However, these machines were affordable only by the very rich.

Many U.S. aircraft designed and registered in the 1920s onward were considered "experimental" by the (then) CAA, the same registration under which modern homebuilts are issued Special Airworthiness Certificates. Many of these were prototypes, but designs such as Bernard Pietenpol's first 1923 design were some of the first homebuilt aircraft. In 1928, Henri Mignet published plans for his HM-8 Pou-du-Ciel, as did Pietenpol for his Air Camper. Pietenpol later constructed a factory, and in 1933 began creating and selling partially constructed aircraft kits.

In 1936, an association of amateur aviation enthusiasts was created in France. Many types of amateur aircraft began to make an appearance, and in 1938 legislation was amended to provide for a Certificat de navigabilité restreint d'aéronef (CNRA, "restricted operating certificate for aircraft"). 1946 saw the birth of the Ultralight Aircraft Association which in 1952 became the Popular Flying Association in the United Kingdom, followed in 1953 by the Experimental Aircraft Association (EAA) in the United States and the Sport Aircraft Association in Australia.

The term "homebuilding" became popular in the mid-1950s when EAA founder Paul Poberezny wrote a series of articles for the magazine Mechanix Illustrated where he explained how a person could buy a set of plans and build their own aircraft at home. In 1955, Poberezny co-founded, with Robert D. Blacker, EAA's first youth outreach program, Project Schoolflight, which brought "homebuilding" into high school industrial arts classes throughout the US. Poberezny's Mechanix Illustrated articles gained worldwide acclaim and the concept of aircraft homebuilding took off.

=== Technology and innovation ===
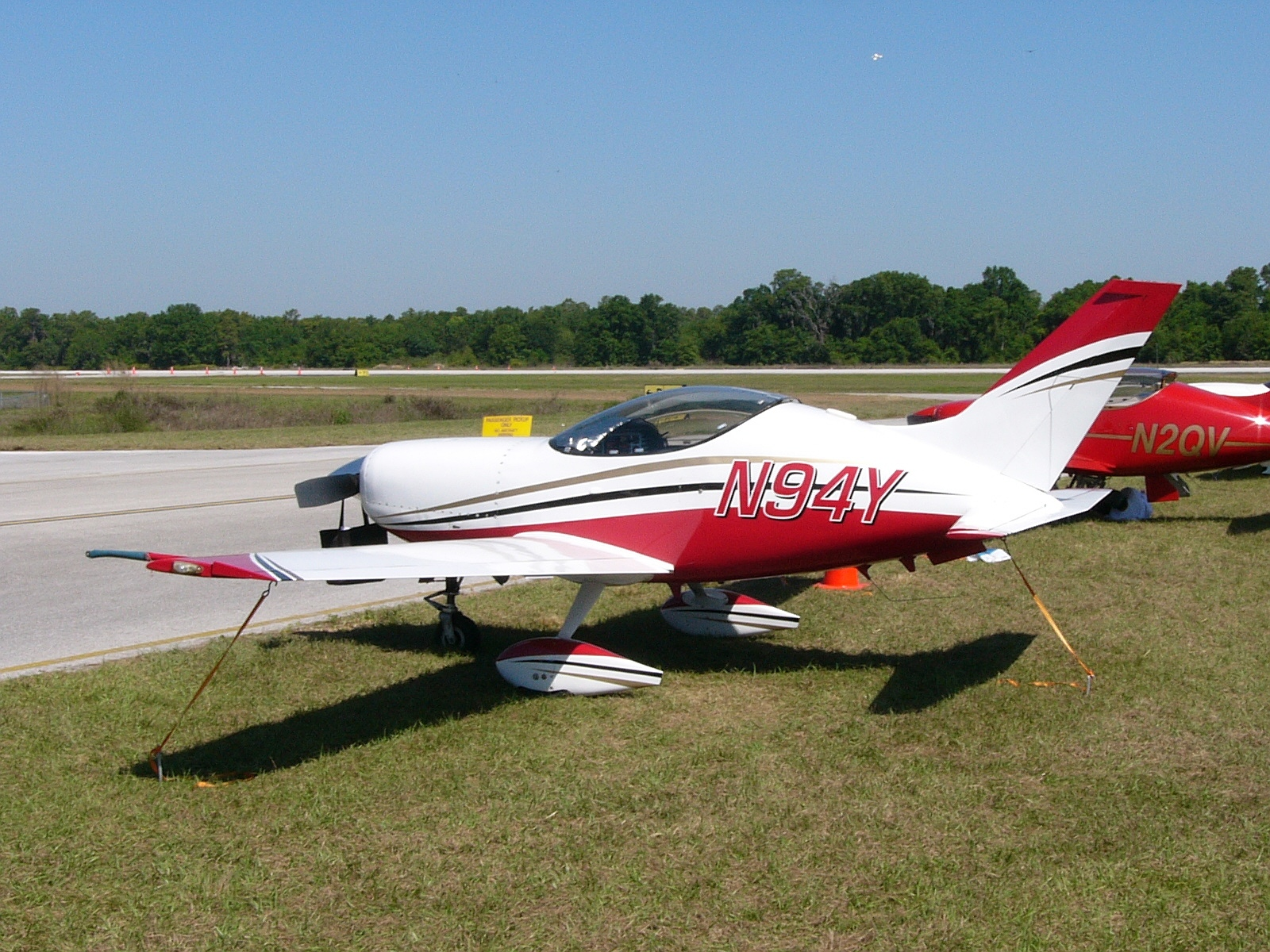
The Questair Venture set new standards for speed in kit-built aircraft design

Until the late 1950s, builders had mainly kept to wood-and-cloth and steel tube-and-cloth design. Without the regulatory restrictions faced by production aircraft manufacturers, homebuilders introduced innovative designs and construction techniques. Burt Rutan introduced the canard design to the homebuilding world and pioneered the use of composite construction. Metal construction in kitplanes was taken to a new level by Richard VanGrunsven in his RV series. As the sophistication of the kits improved, components such as autopilots and more advanced navigation instruments became common.

Litigation during the 1970s and 1980s caused stagnation in the small aircraft market, forcing the surviving companies to retain older, proven designs. In recent years, the less restrictive regulations for homebuilts allowed a number of manufacturers to develop new and innovative designs; many can outperform certified production aircraft in their class.

An example of high-end homebuilt design is Lancair, which has developed a number of high-performance kits. The most powerful is the Lancair Propjet, a four-place kit with cabin pressurization and a turboprop engine, cruising at 24,000 feet (7,300 m) and 370 knots (430 mph; 690 km/h). Although aircraft such as this are considered "home-built" for legal reasons, they are typically built in the factory with the assistance of the buyer. This allows the company which sells the kit to avoid the long and expensive process of certification, because they remain owner-built according to the regulations. One of the terms applied to this concept is commonly referred to as "The 51% Rule", which requires that builders perform the majority of the fabrication and assembly to be issued a Certificate of Airworthiness as an Amateur Built aircraft.

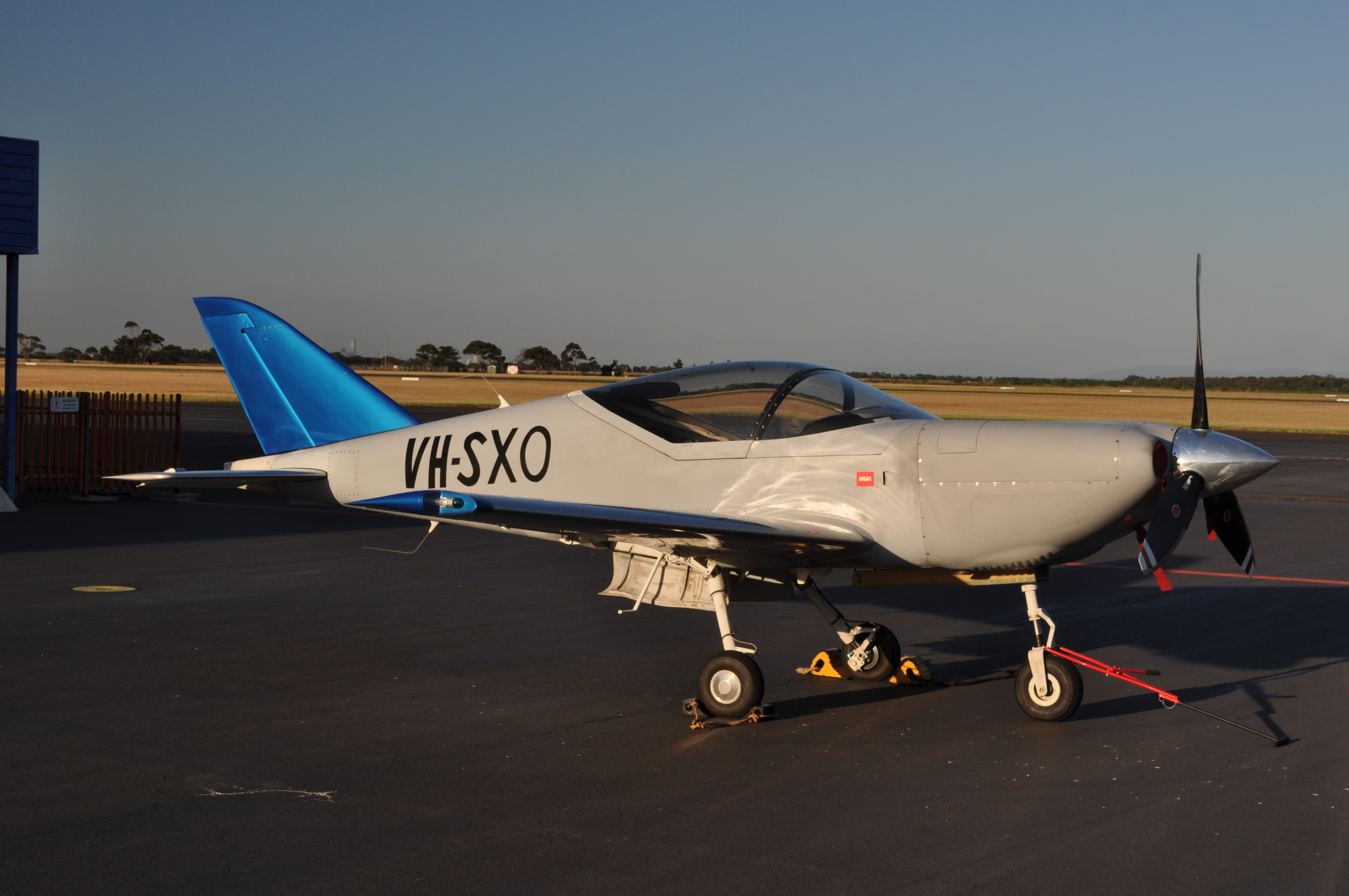
Swearingen SX-300

A small number of jet kitplanes have been built since the 1970s, including the tiny Bede Aircraft BD-5J.

=== Future trends ===
Van's Aircraft and Aircraft Kit Industry Association (AKIA) President Dick VanGrunsven was asked about the future of the kit aircraft industry in a wide-ranging interview in KitPlanes magazine in December 2012:

I don't expect to see dramatic changes in the industry within the next five years. Ten years; who knows – it's too dependent on fuel prices, FAA policy, etc. Overall, I think our industry will continue to mature, particularly as AKIA is successful in growing and having a positive influence on the professionalism of its industry members and on the builders/pilots of its products. With concern over fuel prices, we might see a trend toward lower-powered aircraft intended more for pure sport flying rather than the trend toward cross-country aircraft, which has been the norm over the past 30 years. I would expect that toward the end of that period, there might be some design ventures into electric-powered aircraft, but only if battery technology improves significantly. We might see more motorglider-type homebuilts, tied both to high fuel prices and emerging electric-propulsion technology.

What we do at Van's could mirror some of the above thinking. Unfortunately, I don't see the growth potential that there was in the 1980s and 1990s. There seems to be a shrinking pilot base from which to draw people to build kits. Plus, with demographic changes, there is possibly a diminishing interest in, or ability to undertake, aircraft building as a pastime. Hopefully, EAA and AOPA initiatives to interest more people in learning to fly will help create a larger market for our airplanes.

Emerging markets such as China and India could also boost demand for our products, but entire infrastructures will need to be formed before small players like us could benefit.

== Building materials ==
Homebuilt aircraft can be constructed out of any material that is light and strong enough for flight. Several common construction methods are detailed below.

=== Wood and fabric ===
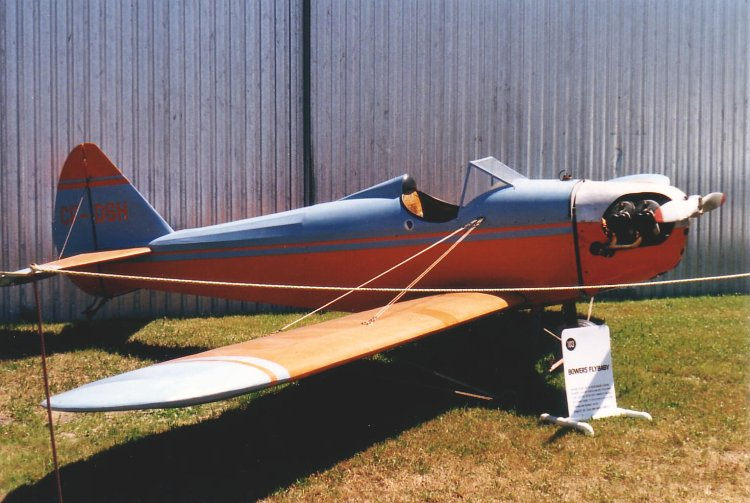
A typical wood and fabric construction amateur-built, the Bowers Fly Baby.

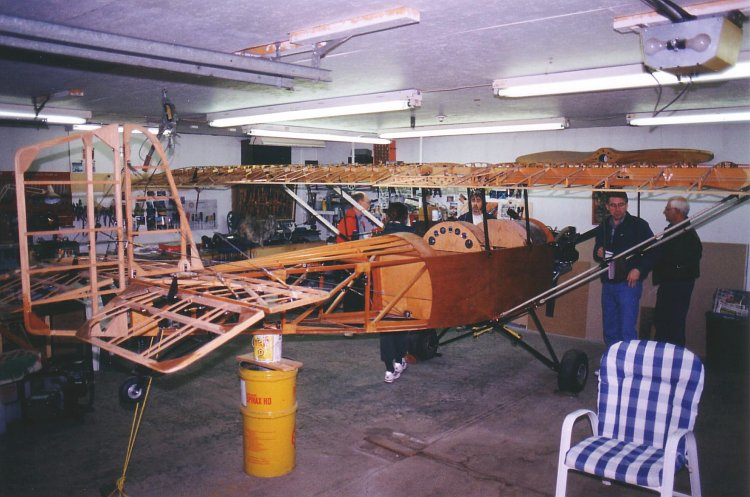
A Pietenpol Air Camper under construction, showing the wooden frame structure that will be covered with aircraft fabric.

This is the oldest construction, seen in the first aircraft and hence the best known. For that reason, amateur-built aircraft associations will have more specialists for this type of craft than other kinds.

The most commonly used woods are Sitka spruce and Douglas fir, which offer excellent strength-to-weight ratios. Wooden structural members are joined with adhesive, usually epoxy. Unlike the wood construction techniques used in other applications, virtually all wooden joints in aircraft are simple butt joints, with plywood gussets. Joints are designed to be stronger than the members. After the structure has been completed, the aircraft is covered in aircraft fabric (usually aircraft-grade polyester). The advantage of this type of construction is that it does not require complex tools and equipment, instead employing commonplace items such as saw, planer, file, sandpaper, and clamps.

Examples of amateur-built wood and fabric designs include:

- The classic Pietenpol Air Camper, a homebuilt that has been built since the 1920s
- The Bowers Fly Baby, a low-wing monoplane which has been popular since the 1960s
- The Ison miniMAX

=== Wood/composite mixture ===
A recent trend is toward wood-composite aircraft. The basic load carrying material is still wood, but it is combined with foam (for instance, to increase buckling resistance of load carrying plywood skins) and other synthetic materials like fiberglass and carbon fiber (to locally increase the modulus of load carrying structures such as spar caps).

Examples of wood-composite designs include:

- Ibis experimental aircraft project, designed by Roger Junqua
- KR series of homebuilts designed by Ken Rand
- PIK-26 designed by Kai Mellen

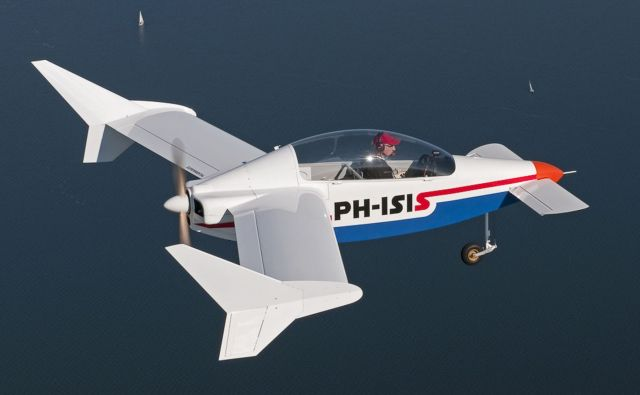
A non-typical wood construction amateur-built, the IBIS RJ03.

=== Metal ===
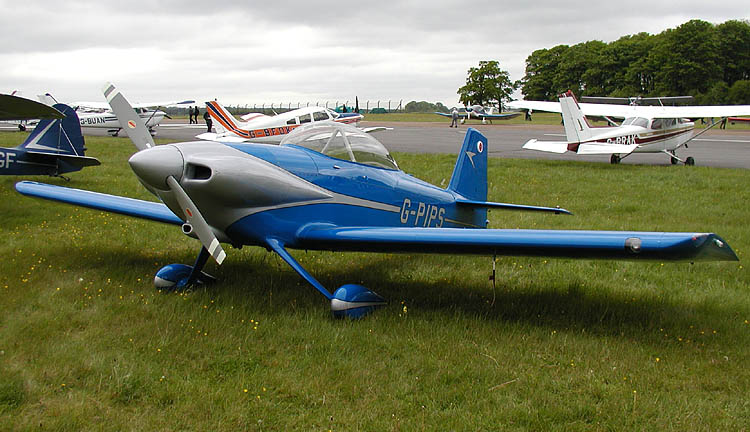
Van's Aircraft like this RV-4 are the most common metal homebuilt type.

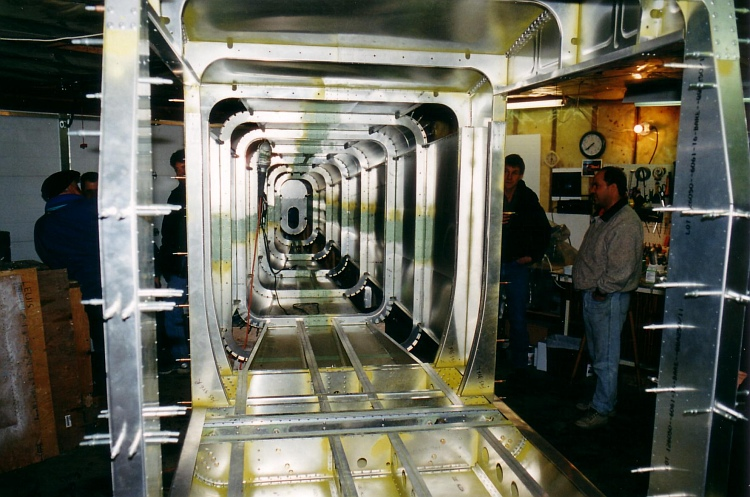
Inside of the tail cone of a Murphy Moose under construction, showing the all-metal semi-monocoque design

Planes built from metal use similar techniques to more conventional factory-built aircraft. They can be more challenging to build, requiring metal-cutting, metal-shaping, and riveting if building from plans. "Quick-build" kits are available which have the cutting, shaping, and hole-drilling mostly done, requiring only finishing and assembly. Such kits are also available for the other types of aircraft construction, especially composite.

There are three main types of metal construction: sheet aluminum, tube aluminum, and welded steel tube. The tube structures are covered in aircraft fabric, much like wooden aircraft.

Examples of metal-based amateur aircraft include:

- The Murphy Moose, Rebel, Super Rebel and Maverick, produced by Murphy Aircraft
- The Vans RV-4, RV-8, RV-10 and other models produced by Van's Aircraft, are the most popular metal homebuilt aircraft
- Chris Heintz's Zenith CH601 Zodiac and Zenith STOL CH701 family of two-seat kit planes
- The ARV Super2 has conventional wings, fuselage, and empennage, but the cockpit is a monococque of "Supral" superplastic alloy

=== Composite ===
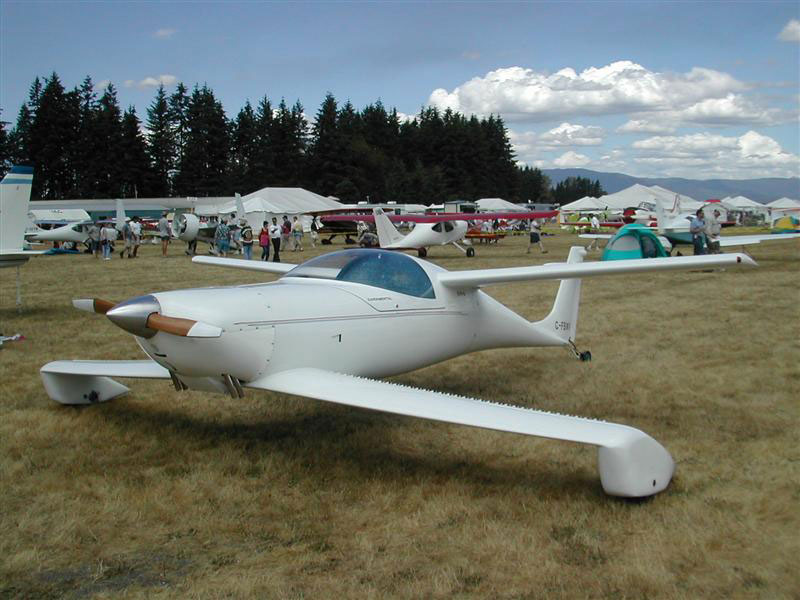
A fiberglass/foam Quickie Q2.

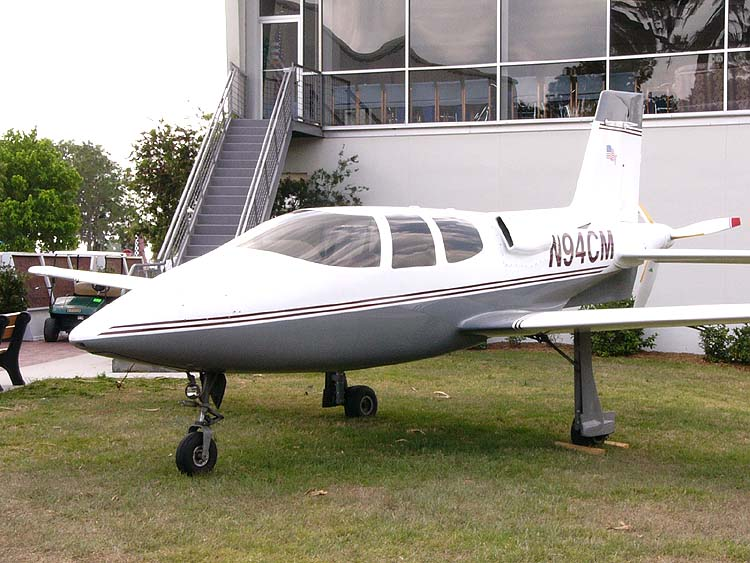
A composite construction Cirrus VK-30, one of the largest homebuilt aircraft of its time.

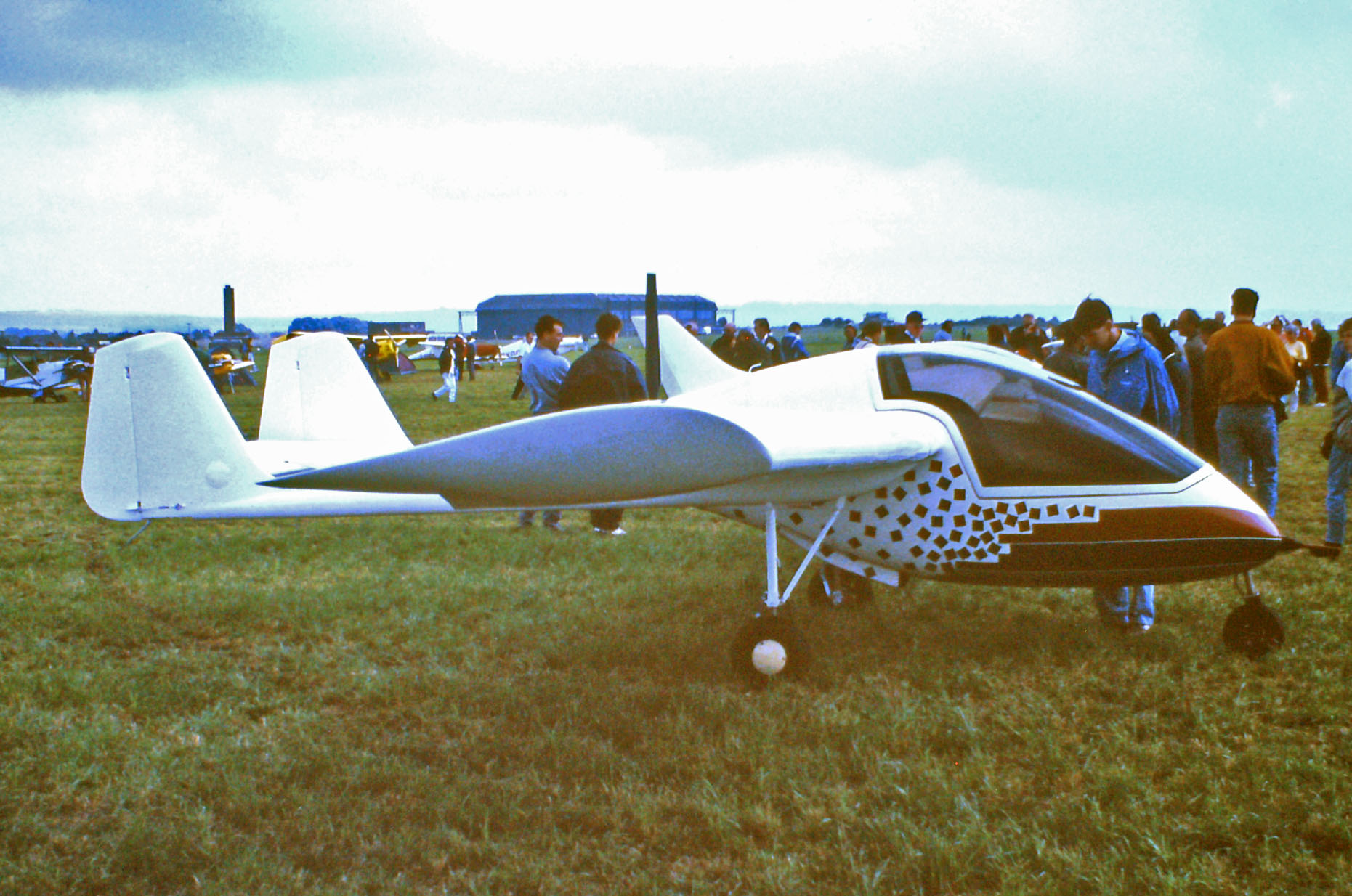
A mixed-construction Aero Dynamics Sparrow Hawk. Materials consist of carbon fiber and Kevlar.

Composite material structures are made of cloth with a high tensile strength (usually fiberglass or carbon fiber, or occasionally Kevlar) combined with a structural plastic (usually epoxy, although vinylester is used in some aircraft). The fabric is saturated with the structural plastic in a liquid form; when the plastic cures and hardens, the part will hold its shape while possessing the strength characteristics of the fabric.

The two primary types of composite planes are moulded composite, where major structures like wing skins and fuselage halves are prepared and cured in moulds, and mouldless, where shapes are carved out of foam and then covered with fiberglass or carbon fiber.

The advantages of this type of construction include smooth surfaces (without the drag of rivets), the ability to construct compound curves, and the ability to place fiberglass or carbon fiber in optimal positions, orientations, and quantities. Drawbacks include the need to work with chemical products as well as low strength in directions perpendicular to fiber. Composites provide superb strength to their weight. Material stiffness dependent upon direction (as opposed to equal in all directions, as with metals) allows for advanced "elastic tailoring" of composite parts.

Examples of amateur craft made of composite materials include:

- Canard designs such as the VariEze and Long EZ designed by Burt Rutan
- The pusher propeller Cirrus VK-30 designed by Jeff Viken and the Klapmeier brothers
- The Europa XS family of British two-place monoplanes designed by Ivan Shaw
- The Glasair I, II and III series of high-performance homebuilts designed by Tom Hamilton

== Safety ==
The safety record of homebuilts is not as good as certified general aviation aircraft. In the United States, in 2003, amateur-built aircraft experienced a rate of 21.6 accidents per 100,000 flight hours; the overall general aviation accident rate for that year was 6.75 per 100,000 flight hours.

The accident rate for homebuilt aircraft in the U.S. has long been a concern to the Federal Aviation Administration. At Sun 'n Fun 2010, FAA administrator Randy Babbitt said that homebuilts "account for 10 percent of the GA fleet, but 27 percent of accidents. It's not the builders [getting into accidents], but the second owners. We need better transition training." In the US, flight instruction, including primary flight training, can be received in the owner's homebuilt aircraft from any instructor willing to provide such training.

A study released in 2012 by the U.S. National Transportation Safety Board concluded that homebuilt aircraft in the U.S. have an accident rate 3–4 times higher than the rest of the general aviation fleet. Almost 10% of accidents involving homebuilt aircraft occurred on the craft's first flight. A further 9% of accidents occurred on their first flight after being sold, due to the new owner's unfamiliarity with the craft. The study also identified that powerplant failures and loss of control in-flight accidents were much higher than the same rates for certified aircraft.

Most nations' aviation regulations require amateur-built aircraft to be physically marked as such (for example in the U.K. "Occupant Warning – This aircraft ... is amateur built." must be displayed), and extra flight testing is usually required before passengers (who are not pilots themselves) can be carried.

== Culture ==
The largest airshow in the world is the Experimental Aircraft Association's annual EAA AirVenture Oshkosh airshow in Oshkosh, Wisconsin, which takes place in late July and early August. Other annual events are the Sun N' Fun Fly-In, which occurs in the early spring in Lakeland, Florida, and the Northwest EAA Fly-In in Arlington, Washington. These events are called fly-ins as many people fly their homebuilts and other aircraft into the airport hosting the show, often camping there for the duration. Both events last a week. Takeoffs and landings at these shows typically number in the thousands.

== See also ==
- Index of aviation articles
- Aircraft design process
- Ultralight
- Special Airworthiness Certificate
- Kit car
