= Fond du Lac County Airport =

Airport in Fond du Lac County, Wisconsin, United States

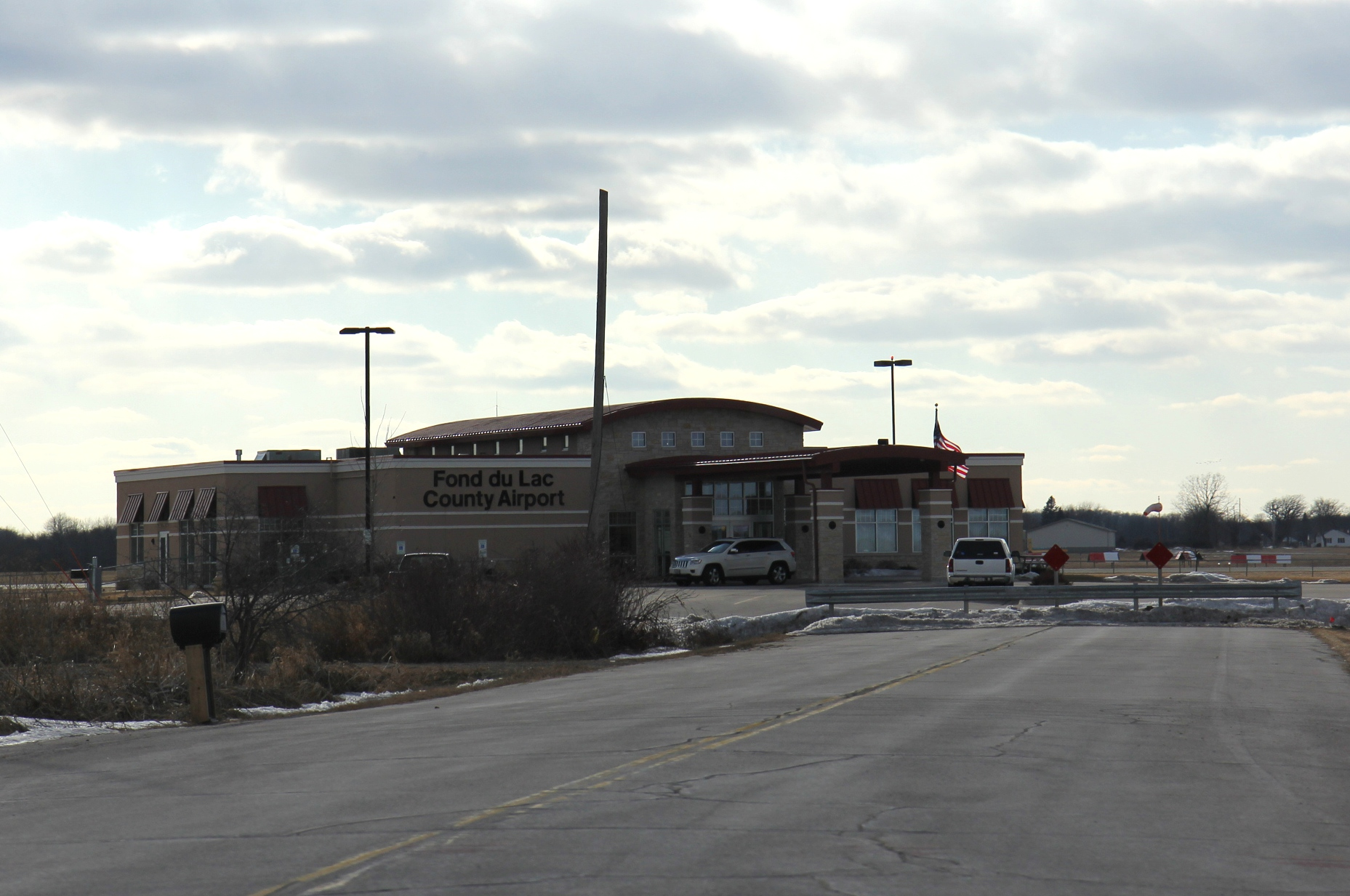
- Terminal building

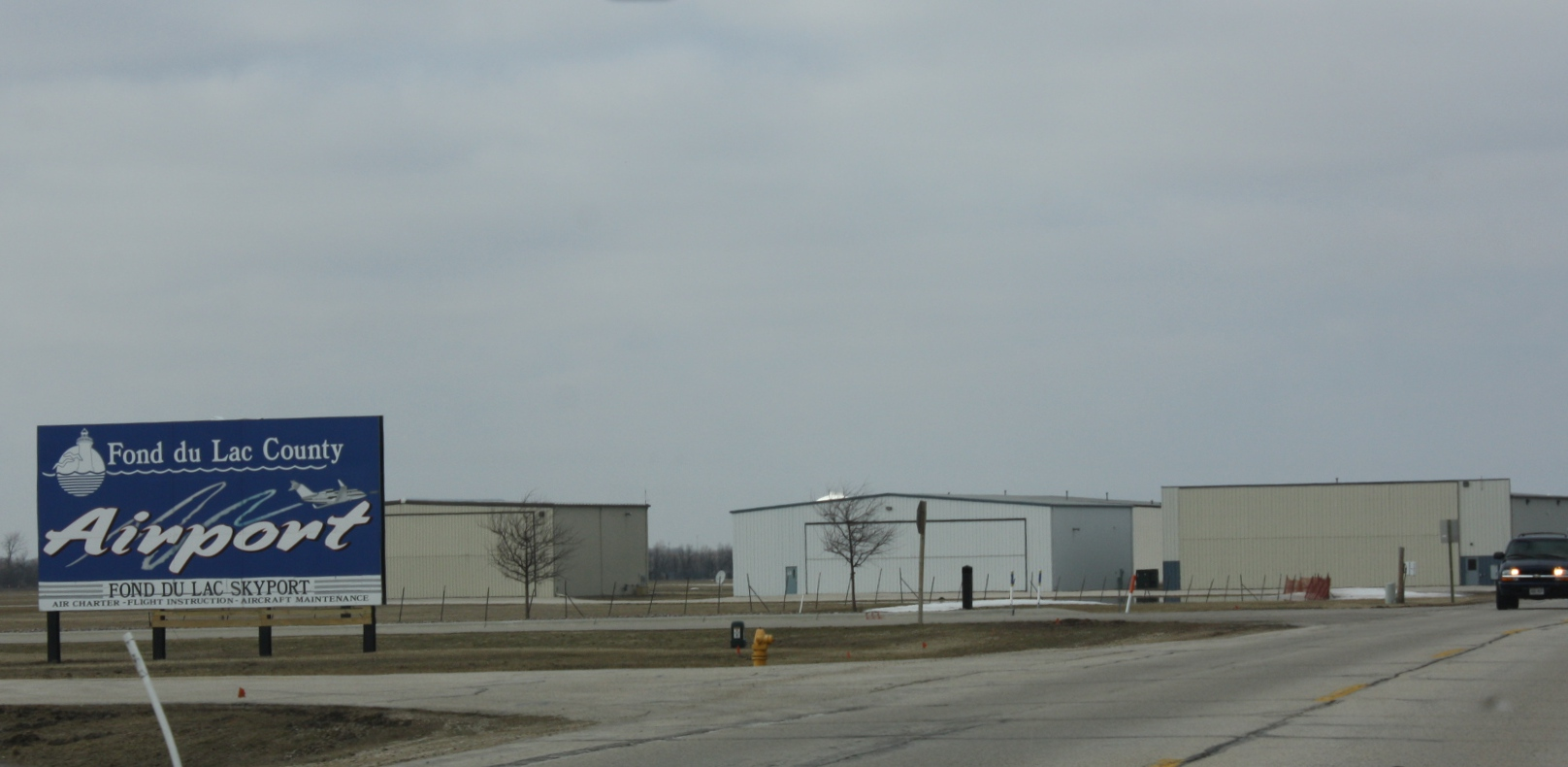
- Airport and entrance sign
- IATA: FLD; ICAO: KFLD; FAA LID: FLD

Summary
- Airport type: Public
- Owner: Fond du Lac County
- Serves: Fond du Lac, Wisconsin
- Opened: October 1958
- Time zone: CST (UTC−06:00)
  - Summer (DST): CDT (UTC−05:00)
- Elevation AMSL: 808 ft (246 m)
- Coordinates: 43°46′16″N 088°29′18″W

Map
- Location of airport in Wisconsin FLD (the United States)

Runways
| Direction | Length | | Surface |
| Direction | ft | m | Surface |
|---|---|---|---|
| 18/36 | 5,941 | 1,811 | Asphalt |
| 9/27 | 3,602 | 1,098 | Asphalt |

Statistics
- Aircraft operations (2023): 63,200
- Based aircraft (2024): 60
- Source: Federal Aviation Administration

Fond du Lac County Airport (IATA: FLD, ICAO: KFLD, FAA LID: FLD) is a county-owned public-use airport located 1 mile (2 km) west of the central business district of Fond du Lac, Wisconsin, a city in Fond du Lac County, Wisconsin, United States. It is included in the Federal Aviation Administration (FAA) National Plan of Integrated Airport Systems for 2025–2029, in which it is categorized as a regional general aviation facility. The airport is home to EAA chapter 572.

== Facilities and aircraft ==
Fond du Lac County Airport covers an area of 586 acres (237 ha) at an elevation of 808 feet (246 m) above mean sea level. It has two runways: the primary runway 18/36 is 5,941 by 100 feet (1,811 x 30 m) with an asphalt surface and the crosswind runway 9/27 is 3,602 by 75 feet (1,098 x 23 m) with an asphalt surface.

The airport has one FBO, the Fond du Lac Skyport.

For the 12-month period ending September 27, 2023, the airport had 63,200 aircraft operations, an average of 173 per day: 95% general aviation, 5% air taxi and less than 1% military.

In August 2024, there were 60 aircraft based at this airport: 54 single-engine, 2 multi-engine and 4 jet aircraft.

== EAA AirVenture ==
The airport, along with Appleton International Airport in Greenville, is an alternative to flying into Wittman Regional Airport during EAA AirVenture Oshkosh. Every year the FAA sets up and operates a temporary air traffic control tower during the event.

Shuttle buses run between the AirVenture grounds and the airport frequently.

== See also ==
- Fond du Lac Area Transit
- List of airports in Wisconsin
