= Fisk, Wisconsin =

- Unincorporated community
- Location within Wisconsin Location within the United States
- Coordinates: 43°57′21″N 88°40′41″W
- Country: United States
- State: Wisconsin
- County: Winnebago
- Elevation: 830 ft (250 m)
- Time zone: UTC-6 (Central (CST))
  - Summer (DST): UTC-5 (CDT)
- Area code: 920
- GNIS feature ID: 1565028

Fisk (also Fisk Corners) is an unincorporated community located in the Town of Utica, Winnebago County, Wisconsin, United States.

== Fisk Approach Control ==
A temporary FAA approach control facility guiding planes visually toward the active runways at Wittman Field during EAA AirVenture Oshkosh.
