= EAA AirVenture Oshkosh =

Experimental Aircraft Association annual convention and air show in Oshkosh, Wisconsin

AirVenture
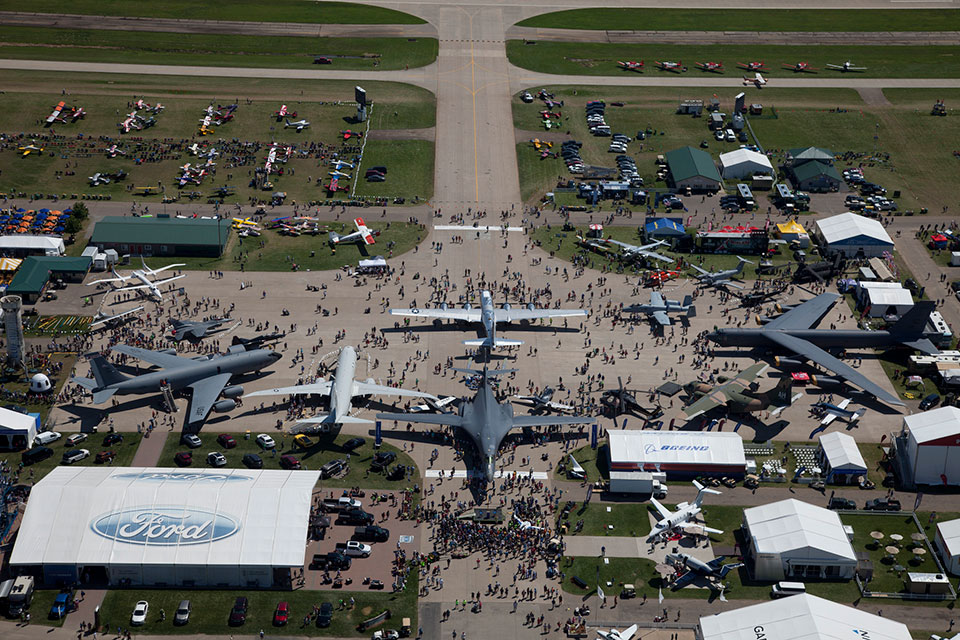
- View of Boeing Plaza at EAA Airventure 2017
- Status: Active
- Genre: Air show
- Dates: Typically the last full week in July
- Begins: July 26, 2027
- Ends: August 1, 2027
- Frequency: Annually
- Venue: Wittman Regional Airport; Pioneer Airport; Vette/Blust Seaplane Base
- Location: Oshkosh–Nekimi, Wisconsin
- Established: 1953
- Previous event: July 20–26, 2026
- Attendance: 730,000 (2026)
- Major events: Aerobatic displays, static displays
- Organizer: Experimental Aircraft Association (EAA)
- Website: https://www.eaa.org/en/airventure

EAA AirVenture Oshkosh (formerly the EAA Annual Convention and Fly-In), or just Oshkosh, is an annual air show and gathering of aviation enthusiasts held each summer at Wittman Regional Airport and the adjacent Pioneer Airport in Oshkosh, Wisconsin, United States. The southern part of the show grounds, as well as "Camp Scholler", are located in the town of Nekimi and a base for seaplanes is located on Lake Winnebago in the town of Black Wolf.

The airshow is arranged by the Experimental Aircraft Association (EAA), an international general aviation organization based in Oshkosh, and is the largest of its kind in the world. The show lasts a week, usually beginning on the Monday of the last full week in July. During the gathering, the airport's control tower, frequency 118.5, is the busiest in the world.

== History ==
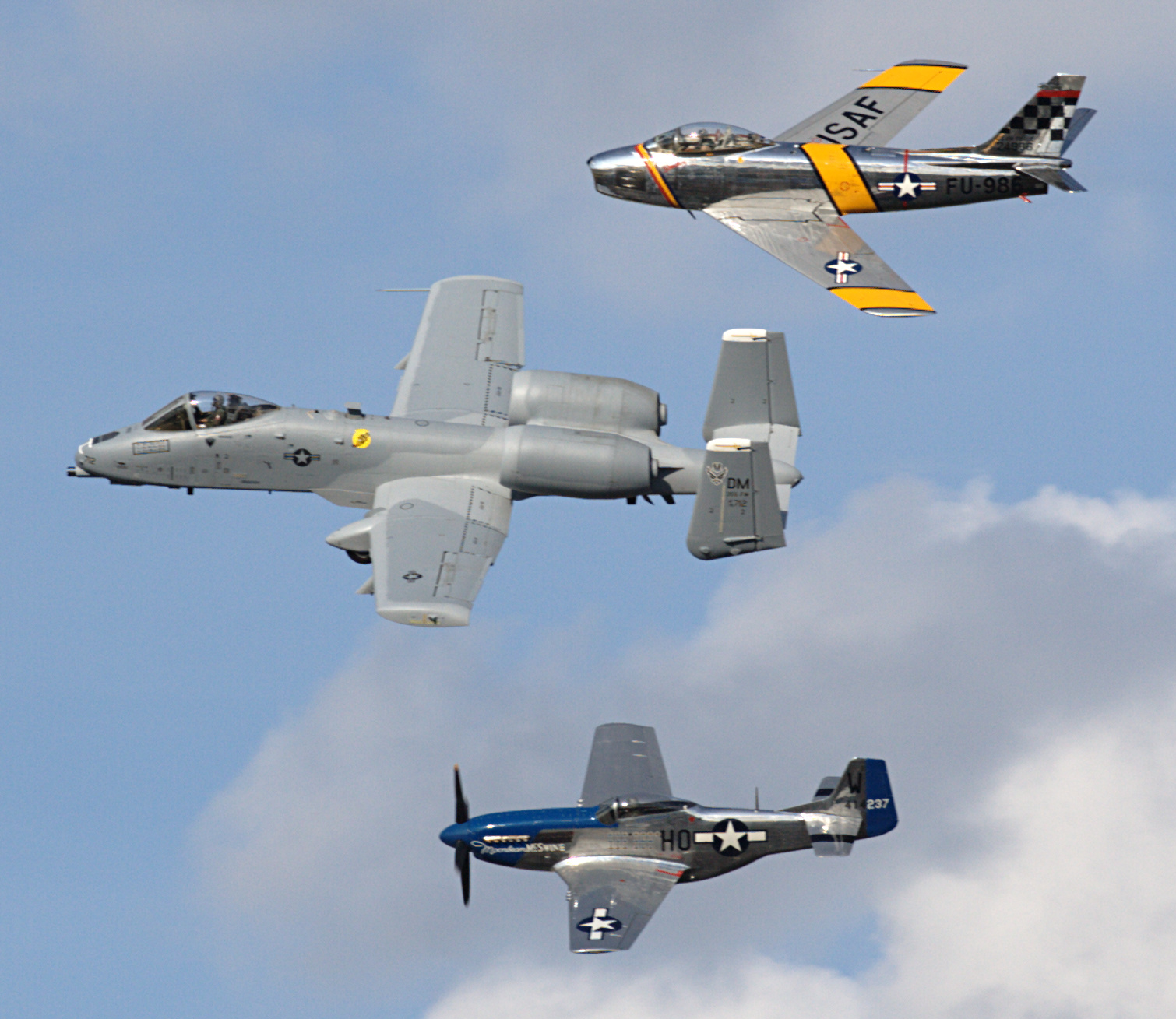
F-86 Sabre (top), A-10 Thunderbolt II (mid), and P-51D Mustang (bottom) performing at Oshkosh in 2009

EAA was founded in Hales Corners, Wisconsin, in 1953 by aircraft designer and military aviator veteran Paul Poberezny, who originally started the organization in the basement of his home for builders and restorers of recreational aircraft. Although homebuilding is still a large part of the organization's activities, it has grown to include almost every aspect of recreational, commercial and military aviation, as well as aeronautics and astronautics. The first EAA fly-in was held in September 1953 at what is now Timmerman Field as a small part of the Milwaukee Air Pageant, fewer than 150 people registered as visitors the first year and only a handful of airplanes attended the event. In 1959, the EAA fly-in grew too large for the Air Pageant and moved to Rockford, Illinois. In 1970, when it outgrew its facilities at the Greater Rockford Airport, it moved to Oshkosh, Wisconsin. Much of the convention's growth and prominence on the world stage is credited to founder Paul Poberezny's son, aerobatic world champion and longtime EAA president Tom Poberezny, who became chairman of the event in 1977.

For many years, its official name was The EAA Annual Convention and Fly-In. In 1998, the name was changed to AirVenture Oshkosh, but many regular attendees still call it as The Oshkosh Airshow or just Oshkosh. For many years, access to the flight line was restricted to EAA members. In 1997, the fee structure for the show was changed allowing all visitors access to the entire grounds. EAA AirVenture holds nearly 1,000 forums and workshops, in addition to their many vendors which bring a variety of aircraft supplies, general merchandise, and name brand sponsors such as Piper, Cessna, Cirrus, and many others.

The 2020 AirVenture convention and air show was canceled due to the COVID-19 pandemic.

=== Historical aircraft debuts ===
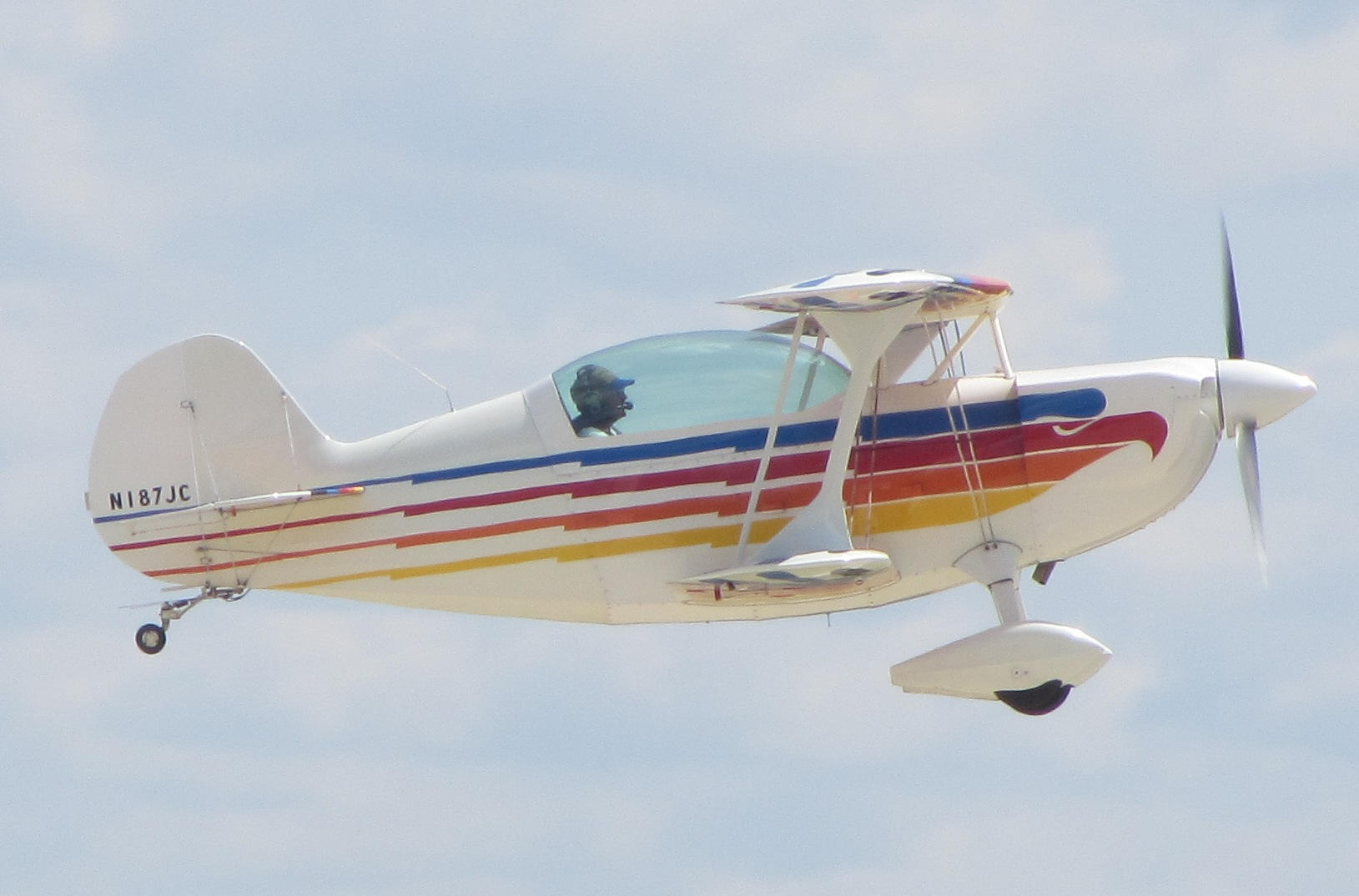
Christen Eagle II at AirVenture 2013

AirVenture has hosted the debut of numerous revolutionary designs. Van's Aircraft founder Richard VanGrunsven debuted his RV-3 at the 1972 AirVenture Oshkosh, a homebuilt that defined new ways of aircraft performance. VanGrunsven would eventually go on to build more homebuilts than anyone else in the world, exceeding the annual production of all commercial general aviation companies combined. In 1975, aircraft designer Burt Rutan introduced his VariEze canard aircraft at Oshkosh, pioneering the use of moldless glass-reinforced plastic construction in homebuilts, a technique that several aircraft went on to adopt in the ensuing years including composite airliners. At the 1987 AirVenture, Cirrus Aircraft's founders, the Klapmeier brothers, unveiled the VK-30 kit aircraft, which later led to the creation of the successful SR20 and SR22, the first designs to incorporate all-composite fiberglass construction, glass cockpits and airframe ballistic parachutes for use in manufactured light aircraft.

Other past notable designs introduced at AirVenture include Frank Christensen's Christen Eagle II aerobatic kit biplane in 1978, Tom Hamilton's Glasair 1 in 1980, and Lance Neibauer's Lancair 200 in 1985.

At the 2018 AirVenture, Jack Bally introduced his Bally Bomber B-17, a one-third scale, single seat homebuilt intended as a replica of the Boeing B-17 Flying Fortress, and Mike Patey introduced DRACO, a highly modified PZL-104 Wilga made for STOL and bush flying.

== Attendance ==
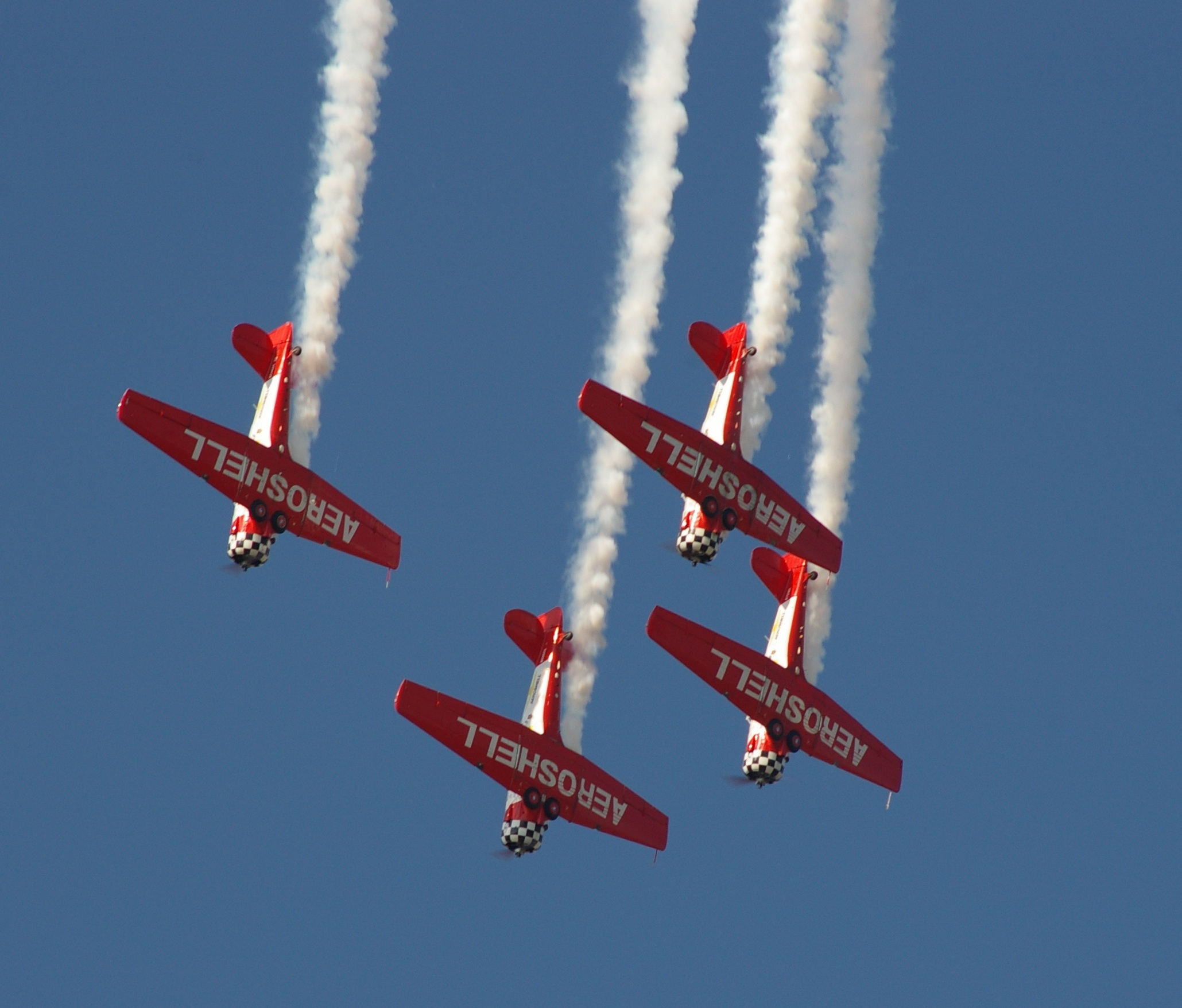
Aeroshell Aerobatic Team performing at EAA AirVenture 2007

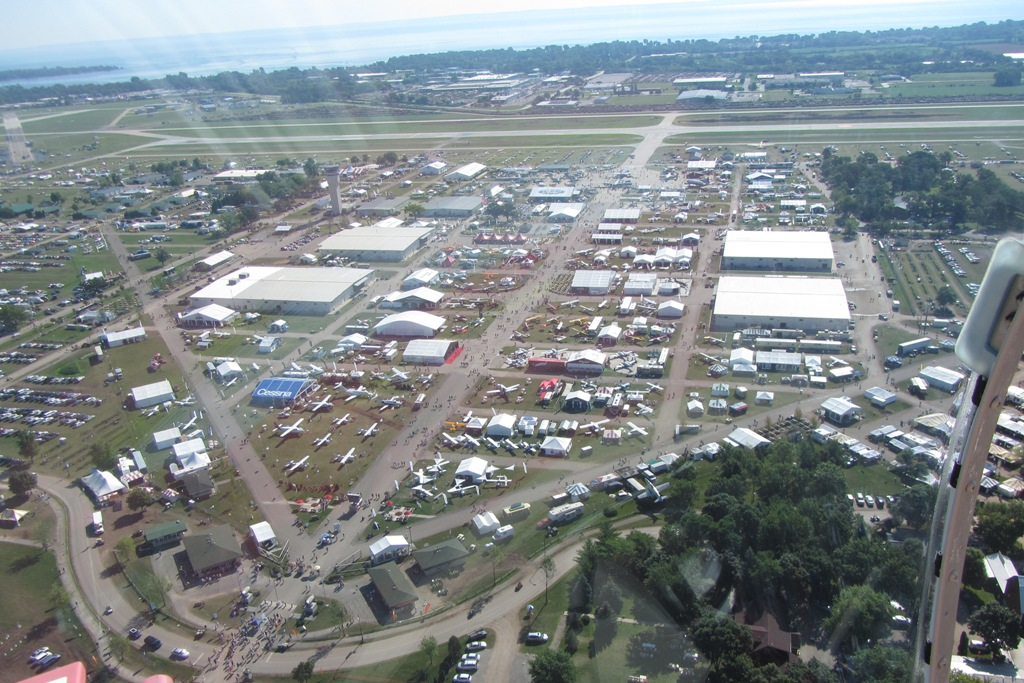
Commercial display at 2011 airshow

The EAA estimated the attendance in 2021 at 608,000 people. In 2018, 2,714 international visitors registered from 87 nations. There were approximately 10,000 aircraft, 2,979 show planes, and 976 media representatives on-site from six continents, along with 867 commercial exhibitors.

In the past, attendance at the event was tabulated on a daily basis rather than on an individual basis. It is unclear whether this practice still exists at EAA Airventure. For example, in 2006 the Oshkosh Northwestern reported that attendance was estimated at 625,000 by the EAA. The estimate was for total attendees each day, so one person attending 7 days would count as 7 attendees. The paper estimated that between 200,000 and 300,000 individuals attended the event.

According to EAA CEO and Chairman Jack Pelton, attendance at the 2024 event was approximately 686,000. This was the highest in the organization's history, exceeding the previous record of 677,000 set in 2023. Pelton also said that more than 10,000 aircraft arrived for the 2024 event. EAA announced that attendance in 2025 was around 704,000.

The large number of aircraft arrivals and departures during the fly-in week makes the Wittman Field FAA control tower the busiest in the world for that week in number of movements. To accommodate the huge flow of aircraft around the airport and the nearby airspace, a special NOTAM is published each year, choreographing the normal and emergency procedures to follow. More than 4,000 volunteers contribute approximately 250,000 hours before, during and after the event.

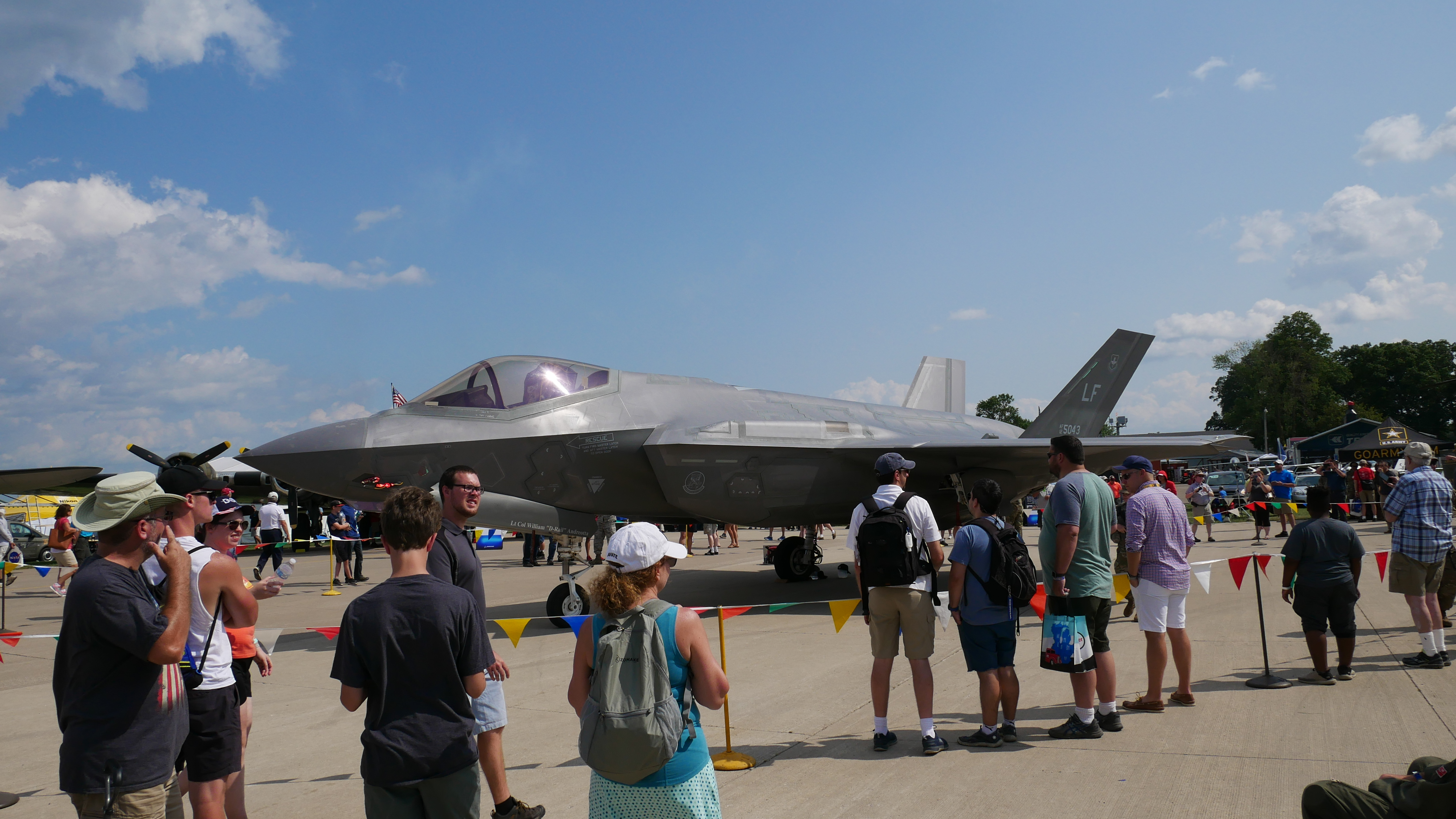
The F-35 Lightning II at EAA AirVenture Oshkosh 2019

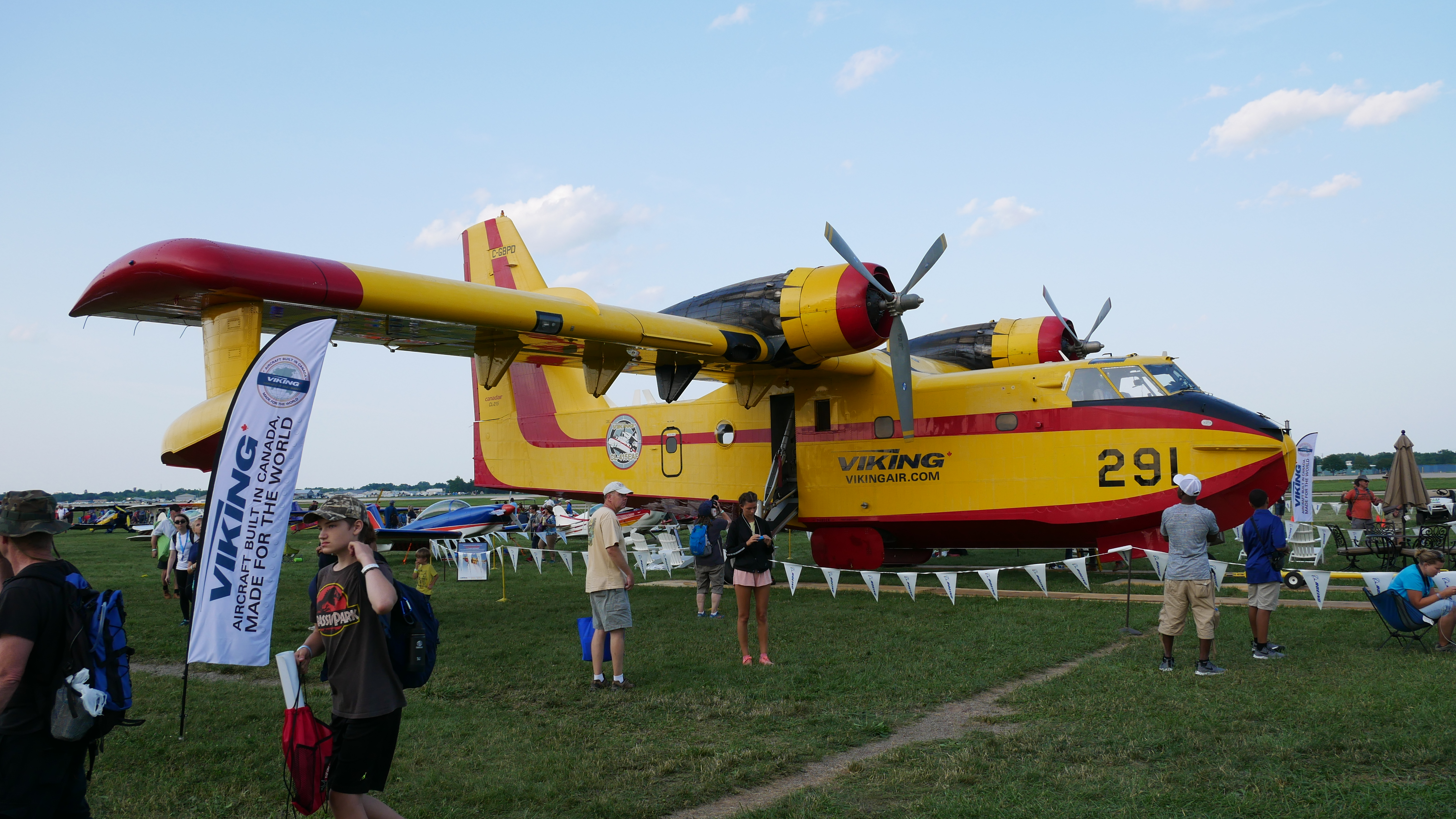
Viking Air Canadair CL-215A at AirVenture 2019

== Economic impact ==
The EAA AirVenture fly-in has a large economic impact on the Oshkosh area as well as the state of Wisconsin. In 1982, the Milwaukee Journal Sentinel reported that the fly-in had a large economic benefit to the Fox Valley region. At the time EAA estimated the benefit to be around $30 million ($100 million in 2025) and the Oshkosh Convention and Tourism bureau estimated it to be lower, at $21 million ($59.2 million in 2025). In 1989, the Oshkosh Chamber of Commerce said that Winnebago County had a $47 million benefit from the fly in. Additionally, a 1987 UW-Oshkosh study reported a $65 million ($184 million in 2025) benefit to the entire state of Wisconsin.

In 2008, a UW-Oshkosh Center for Community Partnerships study showed a $110 million economic impact for the Oshkosh area. Of that, $84 million was direct impact with a $26 million multiplier from secondary spending. Additionally, the fly in provided 1,700 jobs and $39 million in labor income for Winnebago, Outagamie, and Fond du Lac counties. In 2017, it was estimated that the event had an over $170 million economic impact on the surrounding area.

== Air-traffic operation ==
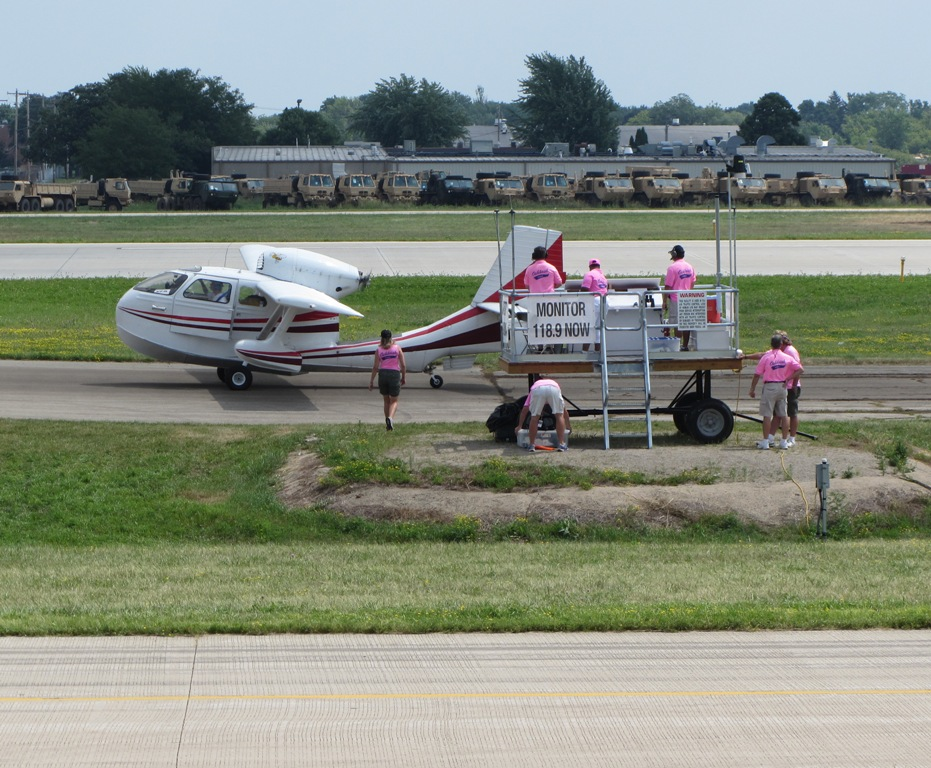
FAA tower team in pink remotely managing departures in 2011

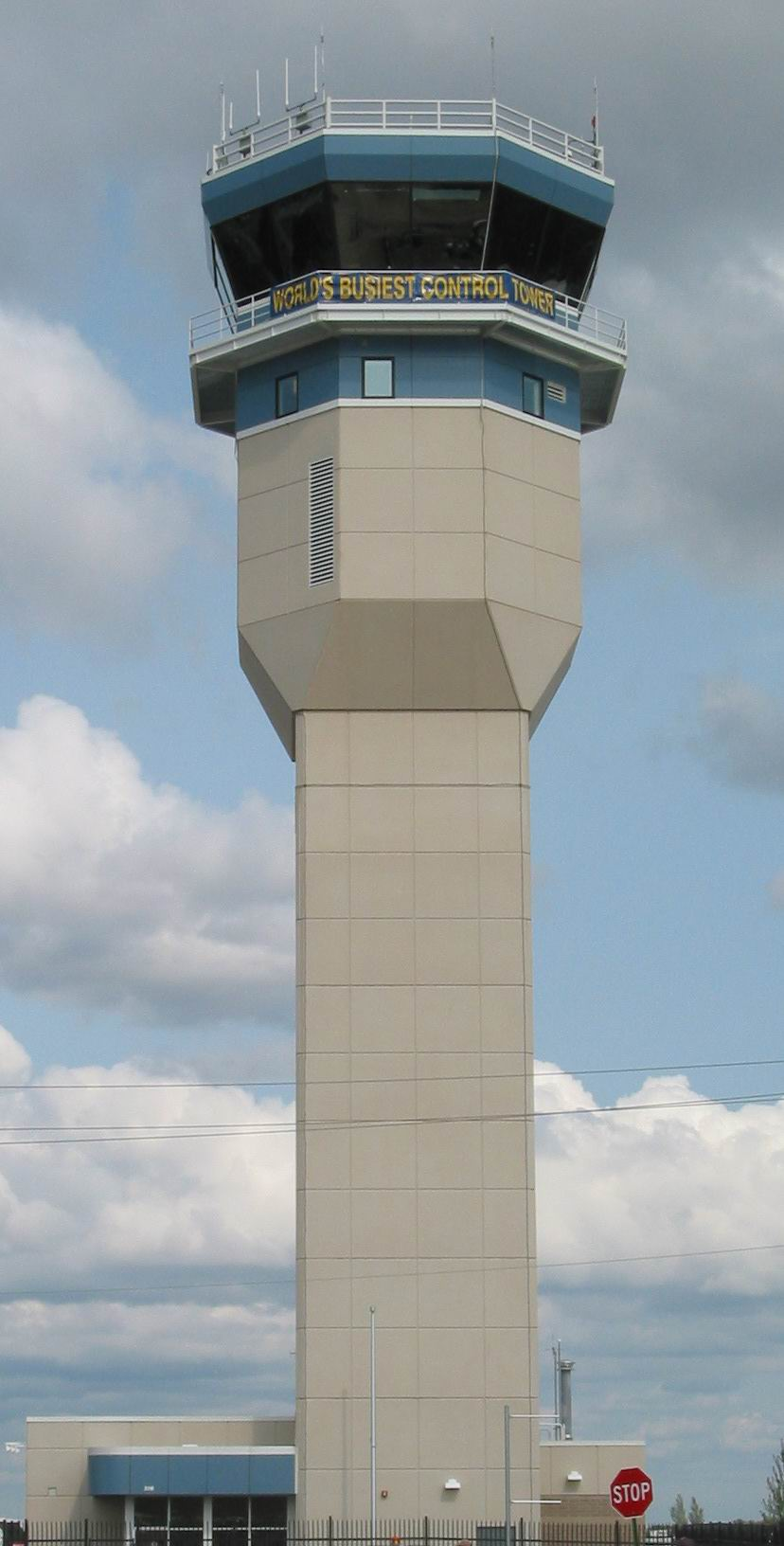
Control tower in 2009 decorated with banner proclaiming "World's Busiest Control Tower"

Fisk arrival

In 1961, the Rockford EAA airshow had 10,000 aircraft movements. In 1971, the EAA airshow at Oshkosh brought in 600 planes and 31,653 movements. Today AirVenture brings in more than 10,000 airplanes. Special air traffic procedures are used to ensure safe, coordinated operations. For example, in 2014 the special flight procedures NOTAM was 32 pages long.

FAA air traffic staff, including controllers, supervisors, and managers, compete throughout the FAA's 17-state Central Terminal Service Area to work the event. In 2008, 172 air traffic professionals representing 56 facilities volunteered to staff the facilities at Oshkosh (OSH), Fond du Lac (FLD), and Fisk. They wear bright pink shirts to stand out in the crowd.

Due to the budget sequestration in 2013, the Federal Aviation Administration announced that it was not able to send resources to support the AirVenture. Rather than cancelling the event, the Experimental Aircraft Association was forced to sign a $447,000 contract to repay the government for FAA resources during the AirVenture. EAA filed a petition in federal court arguing that the FAA could not withhold services without specific Congressional action. However, in March 2014 EAA signed a settlement agreement agreeing to pay the 2013 costs and a further agreement that guaranteed FAA participation for another nine years. The agreement required the association to reimburse the government for AirVenture specific costs that had been provided at government expense in the years prior to 2013.

=== Host airports ===
- Wittman Regional Airport (OSH): Airplanes
- Pioneer Airport (WS17): Helicopters and airships
- Ultralight Fun Fly Zone: Ultralights, powered parachutes, weight shift trikes, gyroplanes, homebuilt rotorcraft, and hot air balloons
- Vette/Blust Seaplane Base (96WI): Seaplanes
- Wausau Downtown Airport (AUW): Home of the AirVenture Cup Race, the kickoff event of AirVenture
- Fond du Lac County Airport (FLD): Diversion airport, additional parking
- Appleton International Airport (ATW): Diversion airport, additional parking, U.S. Customs and Border Protection processing
- Austin Straubel International Airport (GRB): Diversion airport, additional parking
- Planeacres Airport (2WN7): Emergency diversion airport (Fisk approach)

=== Technical operations ===
Several days prior to the event, members of the FAA's Technical Operation team from around the Central Service Area arrive in Oshkosh to set up the temporary communication facilities (mobile communication platforms, Fisk VFR approach control and Fond du Lac (FLD) tower). These technicians maintain the facilities during the event and tear down and store the equipment after AirVenture ends.

== Volunteering ==
EAA AirVenture relies heavily on volunteers who arrive in the weeks leading up to the air show. The tasks they perform range from parking cars and airplanes, to painting buildings, to helping set up and tear down concerts and shows presented by the EAA. Long-time volunteers receive free meals, tee-shirts, embroidered patches, and free admission into the EAA AirVenture event.

== National Blue Beret ==
National Blue Beret (NBB) is a National Cadet Special Activity in the Civil Air Patrol. The event is two weeks long and is set up so that the second week will overlap with the AirVenture airshow. Participants are Civil Air Patrol cadet and senior members who must go through a competitive selection process in order to attend the event. Participants help conduct event operations, including flight marshaling, crowd control, and emergency services.

== Accidents and incidents ==
From 1982 to 2024, 36 people were killed in 23 accidents related to the show.

== See also ==
- EAA Aviation Museum
- EAA Biplane
- Jack Pelton
- Project Schoolflight
- Sport Aviation magazine
- Steve Wittman
- Sun 'n Fun
- Tannkosh
- Young Eagles
