= Bally B-17 =

One-third scale replica of the Boeing B-17

Bally’s Bomber (B-17)
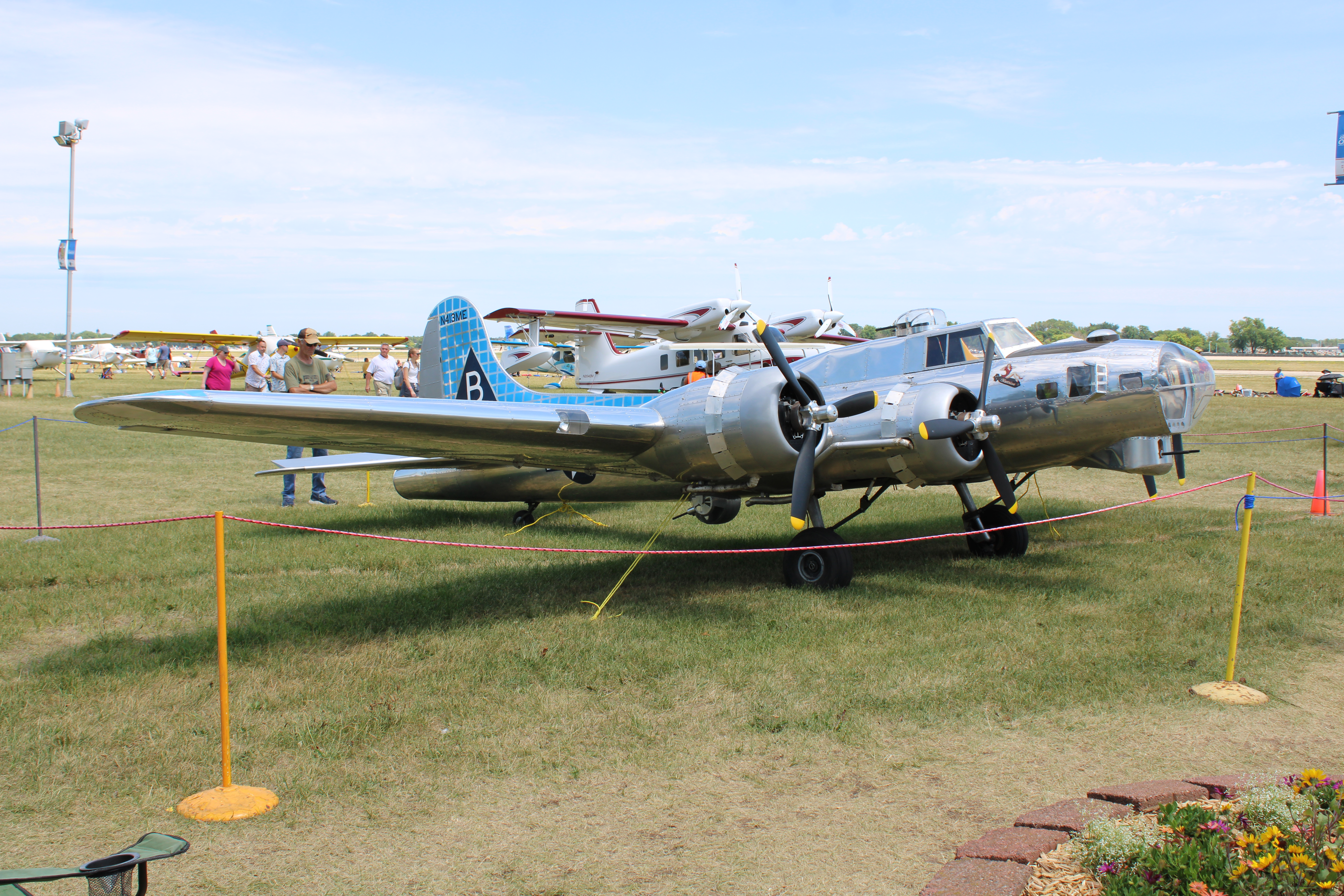
- Bally B-17 at the 2023 EAA AirVenture Oshkosh

General information
- Type: Homebuilt aircraft
- National origin: United States
- Designer: Jack Bally, Don Smith (plans)
- Status: Complete, flying
- Owners: Larry Neu
- Number built: 1

History
- Manufactured: 2001–2018
- First flight: 2016 (during taxi)
- Developed from: Boeing B-17

The Bally Bomber B-17 is a single-seat homebuilt aircraft, intended as a one-third scale replica of the Boeing B-17 Flying Fortress. The Bally Bomber made its debut during the 2018 EAA AirVenture Oshkosh.

== Design and development ==
The Bally Bomber B-17 is an original design by Jack Bally, EAA 348338. The aircraft is a four-engined, retractable conventional landing gear equipped, low wing monoplane. The fuselage is all riveted aluminum in construction with hexagonal bulkheads. The drawings were modified from a one ninth scale set of radio-controlled aircraft plans. Despite being a scale replica, the aircraft is relatively large for a homebuilt aircraft due to its 34 ft (10.4 m) wingspan. Most homebuilt aircraft are single engine designs with a few twin engine models produced, making the Bally Bomber's four-engined homebuilt a rarity.

The Bally Bomber took Bally 17 years and an estimated 40,000 man-hours to build.

== Operational history ==
The Bally Bomber officially debuted at the 2018 EAA AirVenture Convention held annually in Oshkosh, Wisconsin. The aircraft's test pilot was Richard Kosi, EAA 666459, who also acted as an EAA technical counselor on the build. A prior unintentional flight occurred in 2016, when an unexpected gust resulted in a takeoff during a taxi test. Later in 2018, the aircraft was put up for sale by Bally. Larry Neu, EAA 104067, bought the Bally Bomber and returned to AirVenture in 2021 piloting the aircraft.

== Specifications (Bally B-17) ==
Data from Experimenter

General characteristics

- Crew: 1
- Length: 24 ft (7.3 m)
- Wingspan: 34 ft 7 in (10.54 m)
- Empty weight: 1,800 lb (816 kg) Est.
- Fuel capacity: 42 US gallons (160 L; 35 imp gal)
- Powerplant: 4 × Hirth F-30 Two cycle piston, 85 hp (63 kW) each
- Propellers: 3-bladed

Performance

- Cruise speed: 110 kn (130 mph, 200 km/h) Est.
- g limits: +/-6g

Armament

- Replica chin, tail and ball turret
