= Rockford Airfest =

- Status: Inactive
- Genre: commercial, military air show
- Dates: 2017 show was originally scheduled for June 3–4
- Frequency: annually
- Venue: Chicago Rockford International Airport
- Location: Rockford, Illinois
- Country: United States
- Established: 2005
- Attendance: est. 130,000 (2012)
- Major events: Static displays, aerobatic displays
- Website: www.rockfordairfest.com

The Rockford Airfest was a two-day air show that happened every year at Chicago Rockford International Airport located in Rockford, Illinois, United States. Approximately 130,000 people attended the 2012 event.

On December 16, 2016, it was announced on the event's website that the Rockford Airfest would be canceled for 2017 and would not be held in future years. The post cited major ongoing development at Chicago Rockford International Airport as the primary reason for the cancellations.

== History ==
From 1986 to 1994, the Greater Rockford Airport (as it was known until 2003) hosted the Midwest AirFest, which twice featured the Air Force Thunderbirds. The newly renamed airport began hosting the Rockford AirFest in 2005. It was held again in 2006, and the Navy Blue Angels were featured in 2007. The F-22 Raptor Team performed in 2009. The 2010 AirFest once again hosted the USAF Thunderbirds on July 31 – August 1, 2010. The 2011 AirFest (June 4–5) commemorated the 100th anniversary of Naval Aviation. The U.S. Navy Blue Angels were slated as the headline performers, but their performance was canceled as part of the May 23 safety stand-down. The Black Diamond (formally known as the Heavy Metal Jet Team) replaced the Blues at the last minute to fill the Sunday show. Sponsored by United Bank Card, the Black Diamond Jet Team is a five-jet (L-39 Albatros, Canadair T-33) team based out of Lancaster, Pennsylvania.

== Headline performers ==
- 2005: None
- 2006: USAF Thunderbirds
- 2007: US Navy Blue Angels
- 2008: USAF Thunderbirds
- 2009: USAF F-22 Raptor Demonstration Team
- 2010: USAF Thunderbirds
- 2011: US Navy Blue Angels (cancelled), Black Diamond Jet Team
- 2012: U.S. Air Force Thunderbirds
- 2013 (cancelled): U.S. Navy Blue Angels
- 2014: U.S. Air Force Thunderbirds, Snowbirds
- 2015: U.S. Navy Blue Angels, F-22 Raptor Demo Team
- 2017: SHOW CANCELLED U.S. Air Force Thunderbirds
