= Chicago Rockford International Airport =

Airport in Winnebago County, Illinois, United States

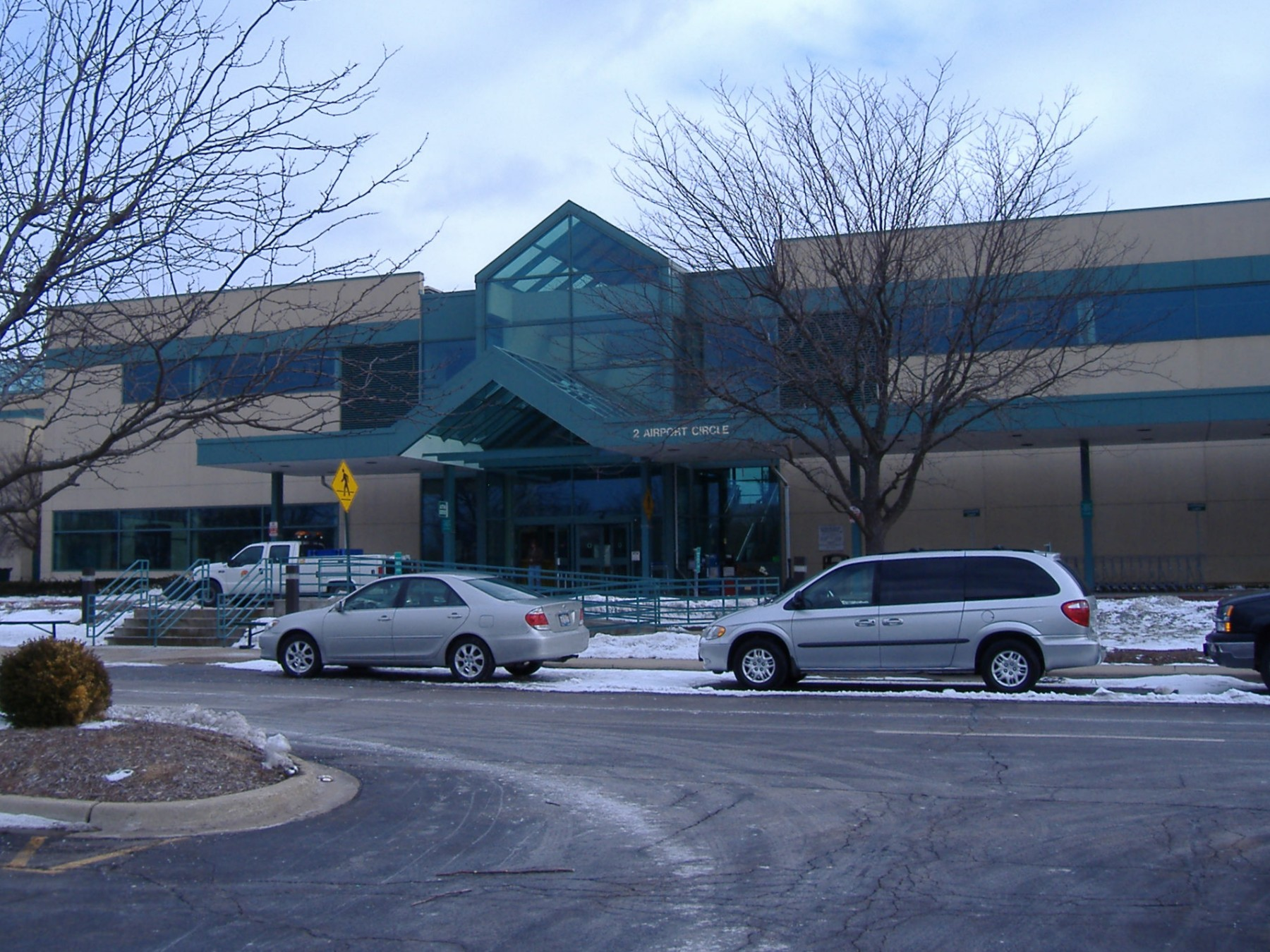
- The main entrance to the passenger terminal at Chicago-Rockford International Airport
- IATA: RFD; ICAO: KRFD; FAA LID: RFD; WMO: 72543

Summary
- Airport type: Public
- Owner: Greater Rockford Airport Authority
- Serves: Chicago metropolitan area
- Location: Rockford, Illinois, U.S.
- Opened: 1946; 80 years ago
- Hub for: UPS Airlines
- Elevation AMSL: 742 ft (226 m)
- Coordinates: 42°11′43″N 89°05′50″W
- Website: www.flyrfd.com

Maps
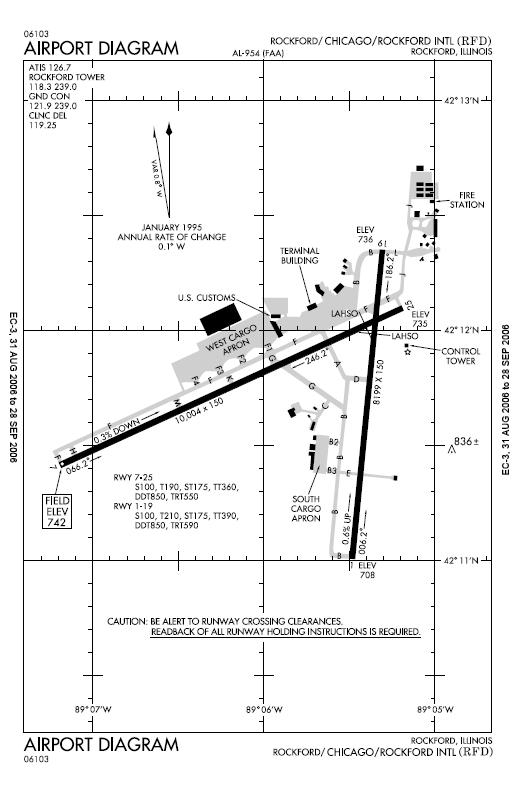
- FAA diagram
- Interactive map of Chicago Rockford International Airport

Runways
Direction	Length		Surface
Direction	ft	m	Surface
01/19	8,200	2,499	Asphalt
07/25	10,002	3,049	Asphalt/concrete

Statistics (2024)
- Aircraft operations: 46,910
- Based aircraft: 114
- Total passengers: 256,000
- Source: Federal Aviation Administration

Chicago Rockford International Airport (IATA: RFD, ICAO: KRFD, FAA LID: RFD) – typically referred to as Rockford International Airport, Chicago Rockford, or by its IATA call letters, RFD – is a commercial airport in Rockford, Illinois, located 68 mi (109 km) northwest of Chicago. Established in 1946, the airport was built on the grounds of the former Camp Grant facility, which served as one of the largest training facilities for the U.S. Army during both World Wars. The Federal Aviation Administration (FAA) National Plan of Integrated Airport Systems for 2023–2027 categorized it as a non-hub primary commercial service facility.

The airport currently receives passenger service through Allegiant Air, which flies to six year-round destinations. The third-busiest Chicago airport in Illinois, Rockford Airport served over 310,000 passengers in 2025, up from 103,000 passengers in 2021.

Currently, RFD is the 12th-busiest cargo airport in the United States, processing over 3.4 billion pounds (1.5 million tonnes) of cargo for 2025 (a 9.2% increase over 2024). UPS Airlines operates a major hub at the airport. The airport is also served by Amazon Air. In the 2020s, cargo operations underwent further expansions, attracting cargo flights from Germany and China.

== History ==
=== Beginnings ===
RFD traces its history to 1917, when Camp Grant was established by the U.S. Army as one of the largest military training facilities in the United States. At the end of 1923, the Army closed Camp Grant as an active facility, transferring it to the Illinois National Guard. In 1941, the facility was reactivated by the Army. During World War II, Camp Grant served as one of the largest Army induction and training centers in the United States, training medical personnel, and serving as a prisoner of war confinement center. Following the end of the war, the facility served as a separation center. In 1946, Camp Grant was shut down for the second (and final) time.

=== Creation of airport and transition to civilian use ===
After World War II, Illinois adopted the Airport Authority Act; the Greater Rockford Airport Authority was created in 1946. In 1948, the Camp Grant land was officially transferred to the airport authority from the federal government. Of the 5,460 acres (plus a 6,000 acre rifle range) of Camp Grant, the airport authority acquired the western 1,500 acres of the facility, bordered by the Rock River to the north and the Kishwaukee River to the south. In 1954, construction commenced on the airport and terminal.

The airport demolished the final remaining Camp Grant buildings on the airport property in 1974.

=== Historical airline service ===
The first airline flights were on Mid-Continent Airlines in 1950. Successor Braniff pulled out in 1955, leaving Ozark, which had arrived in 1951. Ozark Douglas DC-9-10s and McDonnell Douglas DC-9-30s flew nonstop to Chicago O'Hare Airport and direct to Denver in 1976. TWA flew Boeing 727s Rockford to Chicago O'Hare for a couple years starting in May 1980. McClain Airlines Boeing 727-100s flew nonstop to Chicago O'Hare. The original Frontier Airlines (1950-1986) Boeing 737-200s served Rockford from 1984 until late 1986, nonstop to Cedar Rapids, Madison and Milwaukee and direct to Denver when the operation was transferred to Britt Airways, which flew turboprops for a short time.

For a period, Midway Airlines served Rockford with flights to Chicago Midway airport, until the airline went bankrupt in late 1991. Coleman Air Transport had a small hub at RFD in the late 1970s with Grumman Gulfstream Is and was planning to introduce Douglas DC-9-10 nonstop service to New York LaGuardia Airport before losing its operating certificate and going out of business.

Northwest Airlink served Detroit on and off from the 1980s until 2001, when it pulled out for good. Scheduled passenger service ended altogether in 2001, but resumed again in 2003.

Transmeridian Airlines briefly operated a leisure-oriented focus city at Rockford beginning in 2003. Direct Air served the airport from 2007 until it shut down in March 2012. The current version of Frontier offered mainline service to Denver briefly in 2013. It also offered several charter flights, on behalf of Apple Vacations. United Express served Denver from Rockford from 2006 to 2008.

=== Arrival of Allegiant Airlines and current service ===
Allegiant Air began service between Rockford and Las Vegas in November 2005 and between Rockford and St. Petersburg-Clearwater in September 2006. In 2024/2025, Allegiant briefly had service from Rockford to Los Angeles LAX.

As of early 2026, Allegiant is the sole regularly scheduled airline with flights out of Rockford, with eight locations served (Las Vegas, Phoenix/Mesa, Nashville, and in Florida Orlando/Sanford, St. Petersburg/Clearwater, Sarasota, Punta Gorda and Ft. Lauderdale.)

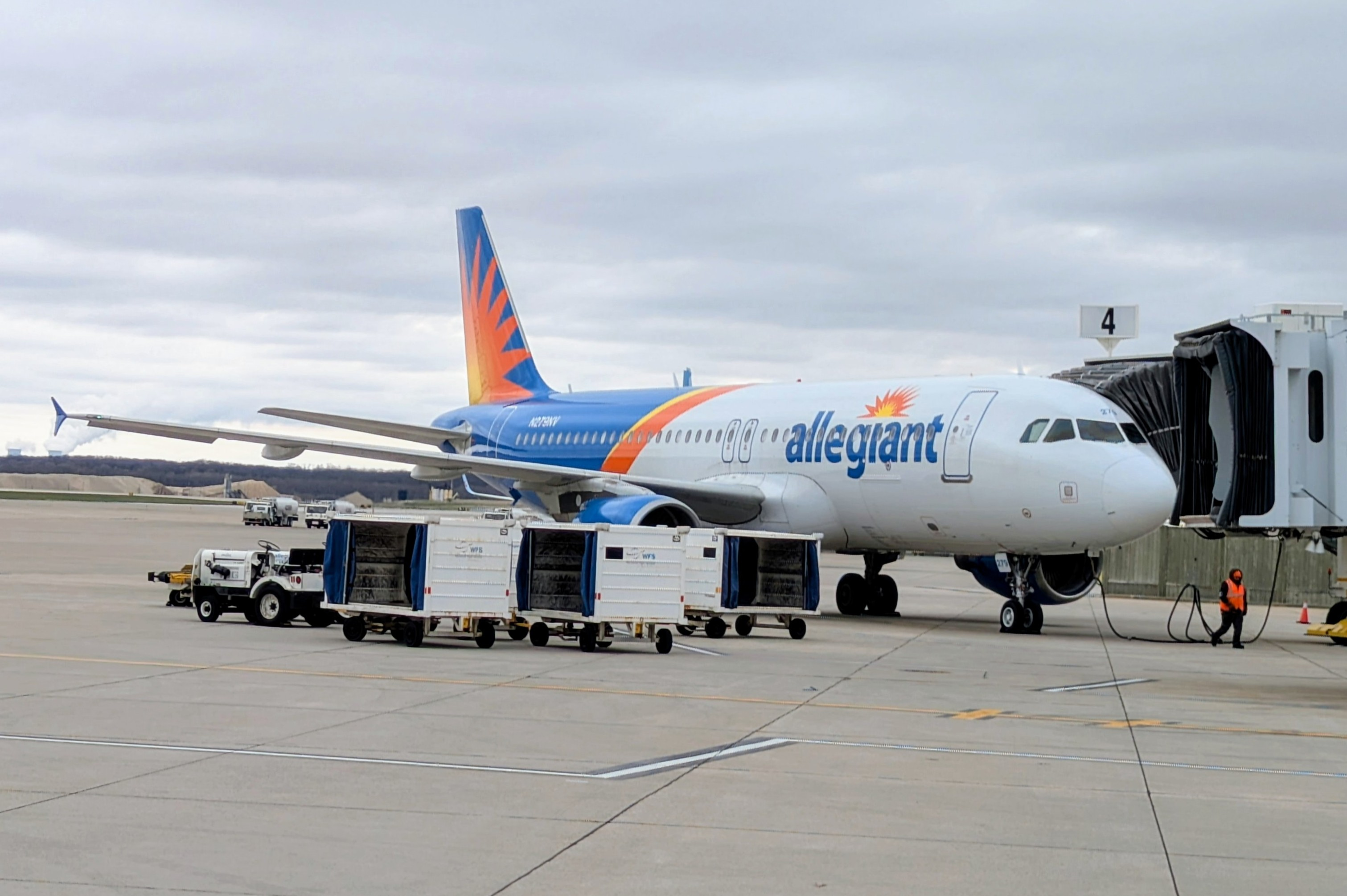
Allegiant A320 at RFD gate 4

=== International service ===
In 2004, the airport became an official US port of entry and achieved international status.

Rockford has no regular airline service to foreign locations, but it does have charter services that go overseas. Apple Vacations offered scheduled flights to the vacation destinations of Cancún, Montego Bay, and Punta Cana for many years, through operators such as Norwegian Air Shuttle and TUI Airways.

International destinations direct from Rockford were suspended because of Covid-19 in 2020, but began again in January 2026, once again through Apple Vacations. These flights are offered seasonally using TUI Belgium aircraft, going to Cancún, and Huatulco in Mexico, as well as Punta Cana in the Dominican Republic.

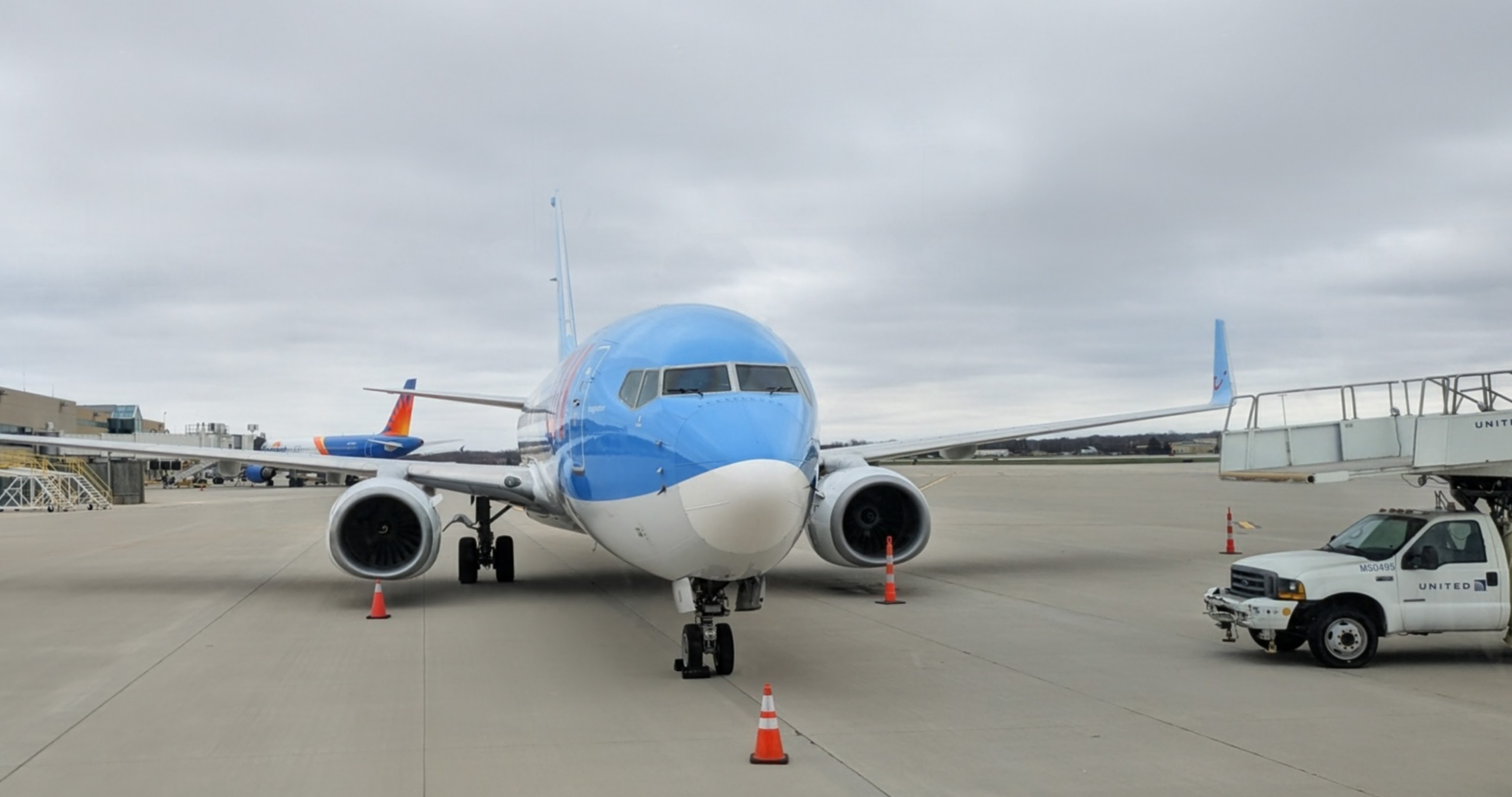
TUI and Allegiant at RFD

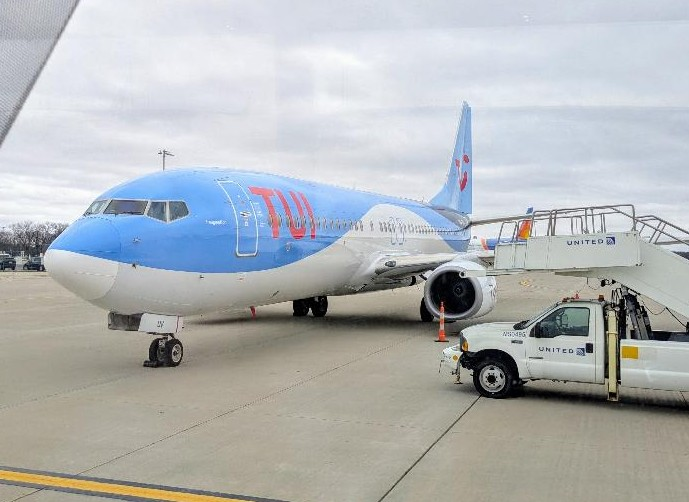
TUI 737 at RFD

=== Name of airport ===
Known for decades as the Greater Rockford Airport name changes were made starting in the 2000s. In an effort to capitalize on its location (less than 90 miles (145 km) from downtown Chicago and about 30 miles (48 km) from the outermost Chicago suburbs), the airport underwent several name changes, initially changing to the Northwest Chicagoland Regional Airport at Rockford. When the airport achieved international status in 2004 it was renamed again, becoming the Chicago/Rockford International Airport (the slash was removed in 2007), bringing it in line with the two original "Chicago" airports (O'Hare and Midway). In many forms of media, the airport also markets itself by its three FAA/IATA call letters: RFD.

Today the Rockford airport is marketed to residents of Rockford and surrounding areas as an alternative to Chicago Midway International Airport and O'Hare International Airport in Chicago, Mitchell International Airport in Milwaukee and Dane County Regional Airport in Madison, Wisconsin, as well as limited service airports such as Dubuque Regional Airport in Iowa. The airlines at Rockford often use their low fares as a selling point. Bus service from Rockford to O’Hare draws away many potential flyers that could otherwise fly out of Rockford. Some Rockford area residents consider driving their car to O’Hare a viable alternative.

In 2023, the airport made headlines when 300+ migrants arrived on a flight from Texas as part of the ongoing migrant crisis in the United States.

=== Rockford AirFest ===
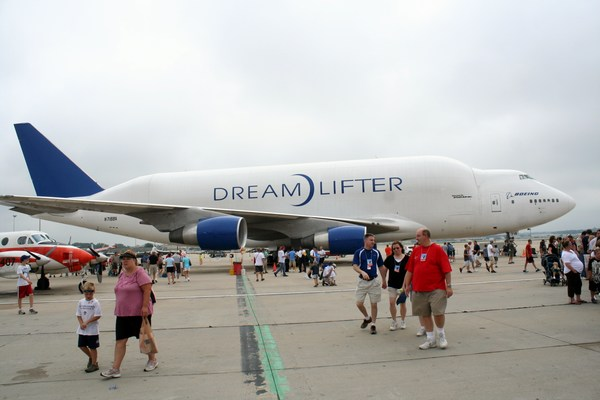
Boeing 747 Large Cargo Freighter (Boeing 747 Dreamlifter) at the 2010 Rockford AirFest

The Rockford airport has played host to airshows in several capacities, often becoming one of the largest events in Northern Illinois. In 1959 the Experimental Aircraft Association (EAA) moved its annual fly-in from Timmerman Field in Milwaukee to the Greater Rockford Airport after outgrowing the smaller Wisconsin airfield. In 1960, 1000 people attended, leading to growth each year through the 1960s. 1969 would be the final year for the EAA fly-in in Rockford, as it had outgrown the Rockford airport.

For 1970, the EAA would move its annual convention/fly-in to Wittman Regional Airport in Oshkosh, Wisconsin, where it has been held ever since.

In 1986 the Greater Rockford Airport returned to hosting large-scale air shows with the Midwest AirFest. From 1986 to 1994, the show would twice feature the United States Air Force Thunderbirds. After an 11-year hiatus, the AirFest (rebranded as the Rockford AirFest) returned in 2005. The airshow is one of the few in the United States that has twice hosted the combination of the United States Air Force Thunderbirds, US Navy Blue Angels, and the F-22 Raptor Demo Team.

On December 16, 2016, Airfest announced that it would be indefinitely canceled. It stated that the airport had become too busy to hold the event.

== Facilities ==
The original airport terminal dates from about 1955. Also in the 1950s the airport got its first control tower with the expansion of services from Braniff, Mid-Continent, and Ozark. Radar was installed in the tower in the 1970s, and the airport soon began operating 24/7.

=== Passenger ===
The current terminal was built in 1987 in an effort to expand airline service in Rockford, but bus service to O'Hare International Airport kept most airlines away from Rockford. Passenger service was lost completely from 2001 to 2003. An upgrade to the terminal in 2005 brought more jetways, escalators, and improved baggage handling equipment (the previous system catered to smaller turboprop aircraft rather than jets). In 2013, the terminal was renamed the Donald A. Manzullo International Terminal. In 2017, the airport received a grant to expand both passenger terminals and cargo areas.

=== Cargo Zone ===
The airport has billed itself as a centralized location in northern Illinois for cargo service. United Parcel Service opened the first of multiple cargo facilities at the airport in 1994. The largest ramp at the airport, it has parking spaces for up to 40 jet aircraft.

Southwest of the UPS ramp in 2008, the airport built a third cargo ramp and a 72,000 square foot warehouse. In 2016, the facilities were leased for the first time to ABX Air to transfer air freight to trucks through the facility.

In 2020, Rockford began construction on a 90,000 square foot cargo facility to increase cargo capacity, finishing in 2021. A $16 million investment in building a new ramp that can fit 6 more 747-8 aircraft and construction of an additional 100,000 square feet was announced by the airport. The airport received a $6.8 million grant from the FAA in the Fall of 2022 to construct these facilities.

In 2021-2023, Rockford constructed all of the aforementioned facilities, after a delay attributed to heating and cooling equipment. Menzies Aviation begun operations on June 1, 2023 for 10 years at a 50,000 square foot cargo terminal in 2023. Maersk Air Cargo occupies 60,000 square feet, DB Schenker occupies 50,000 square feet, and Emery Air occupies the remaining area. A temporary fuel storage area was opened to wait for construction of a direct pipeline into the airport. The facilities are part of a larger plan to have up to 1 million square feet of cargo space in order to become a better alternative for cargo traffic in the Chicago area.

=== Runways and tarmac ===
Chicago Rockford International Airport covers 2,900 acres (1,200 ha) and has two runways, both with an ILS: 1/19 is 8,200 x 150 ft. (2,499 x 46 m), and 7/25 is 10,002 x 150 ft. (3,049 x 46 m). In 2017 the airport had 39,462 aircraft operations, average 108 per day: 61% general aviation, 31% airline, 4% military, and 3% air taxi. The airport is in a foreign-trade zone.

As runway 7/25 is 10,000 feet (3,000 m) long, a variety of large aircraft can land at RFD; the largest aircraft that has landed at RFD is the Antonov An-124 Ruslan. In addition to the passenger terminal, the airport is home to three cargo ramps.

Between the two runways, the smaller south ramp is home to one of two FBOs at the airport. In 2015, the former BAX Global (through Air Transport International/ATI) and DHL Express (ABX Air) cargo facilities were demolished to begin construction on a 200,000 square foot MRO facility owned and operated by AAR Corporation, which was opened in 2016.

== Ground transportation ==
Public transit service to the airport is provided by the Rockford Mass Transit District. Route 7 operates from the airport to downtown Rockford.

Several rental car companies are present at the airport. Multiple car parking lots are available for use by passengers for a fee.

American Airlines operated a tarmac to tarmac shuttle service to Chicago O'Hare from October 20, 2025 to October 4, 2026.

== Airlines and destinations ==
=== Passenger ===
Airlines	Destinations	Refs
Allegiant Air	Fort Lauderdale, Las Vegas, Nashville, Orlando/Sanford, Phoenix/Mesa, Punta Gorda (FL), Sarasota, St. Petersburg/Clearwater	

Destinations map
Destinations from Chicago Rockford International Airport
Red = Year-round destination
Blue = Future destination
Green = Seasonal destination
Pink = Destination being terminated

=== Cargo ===
Airlines	Destinations	Refs.
ABX Air	Cincinnati/Covington, Fort Worth, Manchester, Miami, Stockton	
Air Atlanta Icelandic	Halifax, Liège	
Air Transport International	Allentown, Baltimore, Cincinnati/Covington, Denver, Fort Worth, Hartford, Ontario (CA), San Francisco, Seattle–Tacoma, Wilmington (OH)	
Amerijet International	Anchorage, Panama City	
Atlas Air	Newark, Shanghai–Pudong	
UPS Airlines	Baltimore, Billings, Charlotte, Columbus–Rickenbacker, Cedar Rapids/Iowa City, Dallas/Forth Worth, Denver, Detroit, Harrisburg, Hartford, Houston–Intercontental, Kansas City, Lansing, Long Beach, Los Angeles–LAX, Louisville (UPS Worldport), Memphis, Milwaukee, Minneapolis/St. Paul, Newark, New York–JFK, Oakland, Omaha, Ontario (CA), Peoria, Philadelphia, Phoenix–Sky Harbor, Portland (OR), Reno/Tahoe, Sacramento–Mather, St. Louis, San Antonio, Seattle–Boeing, Seattle–Tacoma, Washington–Dulles	

== Statistics ==
=== Annual traffic ===
RFD Airport Annual Passengers and Cargo (2019–Present)
Year	Passengers	Cargo (billions of pounds)	U.S. Rank
2019	250,000	2.372	19
2020	84,000	2.739	17
2021	103,000	3.410	14
2022	242,000	3.424	13
2023	238,166	3.097	15
2024	262,432	3.144	14
2025	310,000	3.433	12

=== Top destinations ===
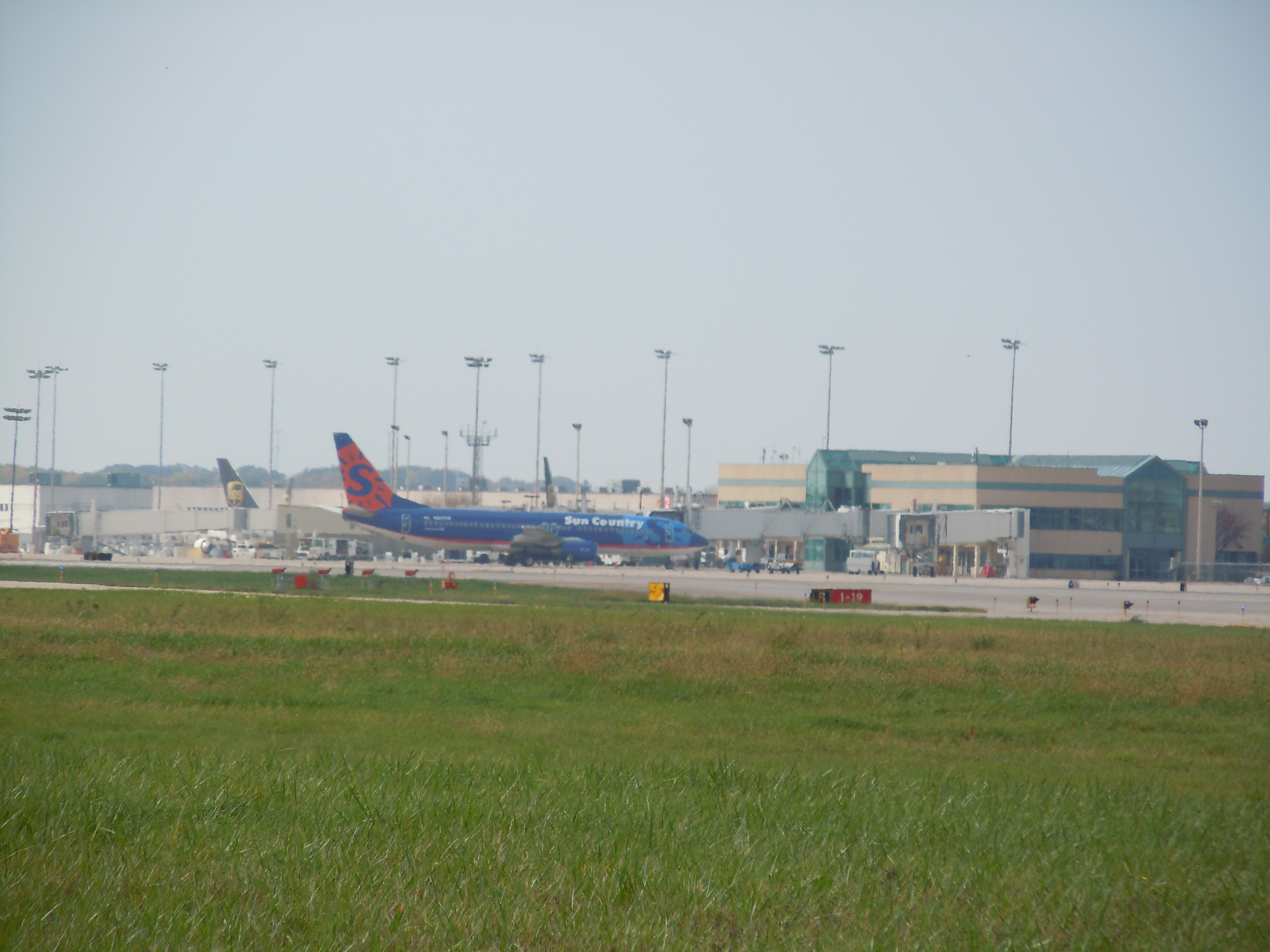
View of the airport's main terminal from the runway

Busiest domestic routes from RFD (September 2025 – August 2026)
Rank	City	Passengers	Carriers
1	Punta Gorda, Florida	33,420	Allegiant
2	Phoenix/Mesa, Arizona	29,180	Allegiant
3	Orlando/Sanford, Florida	23,650	Allegiant
4	St. Petersburg/Clearwater, Florida	20,220	Allegiant
5	Sarasota, Florida	15,960	Allegiant
6	Las Vegas, Nevada	15,110	Allegiant
7	Ft. Lauderdale, Florida	7,920	Allegiant
8	Nashville, Tennessee	5,700	Allegiant

For the 12-month period ending on December 31, 2021, the airport averaged 129 operations per day, or about 47,000 per year. This is 51% commercial, 44% general aviation, 3% air taxi, and 2% military. There are 114 aircraft based on the field: 78 single-engine and 18 multi-engine airplanes, 15 jets, and three helicopters.

== Accidents and incidents ==
- On August 19, 1993, a Cessna 310 crashed after takeoff from Rockford International Airport. The probable cause of the accident was found to be an arcing electrical relay (solenoid) and subsequent overheating/fire of the starter wiring and adjacent fuel lines.
- On December 17, 2002, a Cessna 208B impacted terrain while on the instrument landing system approach into Rockford. The aircraft was carrying packages on behalf of UPS. The cause of the accident was found to be the pilot's failure to maintain control of the airplane during the ILS approach. Factors associated with the accident were the low ceilings, high winds, crosswind, and wind shear conditions that existed.
- On December 8, 2005, a Piper PA-44 Seminole was substantially damaged during a hard landing at Rockford International Airport. The flight instructor stated that he intended for the dual student to execute a simulated forced landing on the remaining runway immediately after liftoff. Upon reaching an altitude of 200 feet above ground level (agl), the flight instructor aboard instructed the student to reduce both throttles to idle while pitching for a landing attitude at 88 .knots. The resulting descent rate "did not appear favorable," so at about 100 feet AGL, the instructor commanded a go-around. Full engine power was applied; however, the descent continued until the airplane contacted the runway in a "flat attitude." The aircraft subsequently bounced and the stall warning horn sounded. The instructor took control of the aircraft and flew a normal traffic pattern to a full stop landing. He noted that, during the flight around the traffic pattern, the rudder and stabilator were "less responsive than usual." The probable cause of the accident was found to be a failure of the commercial pilot (dual student) to maintain a proper descent rate and a safe airspeed during the simulated forced landing; contributing factors included the flight instructor's delayed remedial action and the inadvertent stall prior to runway contact.
- On December 23, 2008, a Boeing 747 struck a pole while taxiing at Rockford International Airport. A report submitted by the operator stated that the airplane had landed at RFD and was taxiing when the accident occurred. The taxiway markings on the ramp were obscured by snow. The airplane impacted a light pole while being guided to parking by ground handlers including a wing-walker positioned at the right wing tip. The taxi speed was low due to the snow cover and positive contact with the ground handlers was maintained by the flight crew. The probable cause of the accident was found to be the ground crew's failure to maintain clearance from the light pole while directing the airplane to parking.
- On March 12, 2018, a Cessna 182 Skylane crashed in Rockford when the pilot looked away to find his iPad during landing. The pilot took his eyes off the runway to grab the device that was located on the seat next to him and the airplane collided with the ground, in a nose down attitude. The probable cause of the accident was found to be the pilot's unnecessary action during the approach, which resulted in a hard landing.
- On August 20, 2020, a Beechcraft Super King Air crashed while attempting to take off from Rockford.

== See also ==
- List of airports in Illinois
- Proposed Chicago south suburban airport
