= Fond du Lac Area Transit =

Public transit in wisconsin

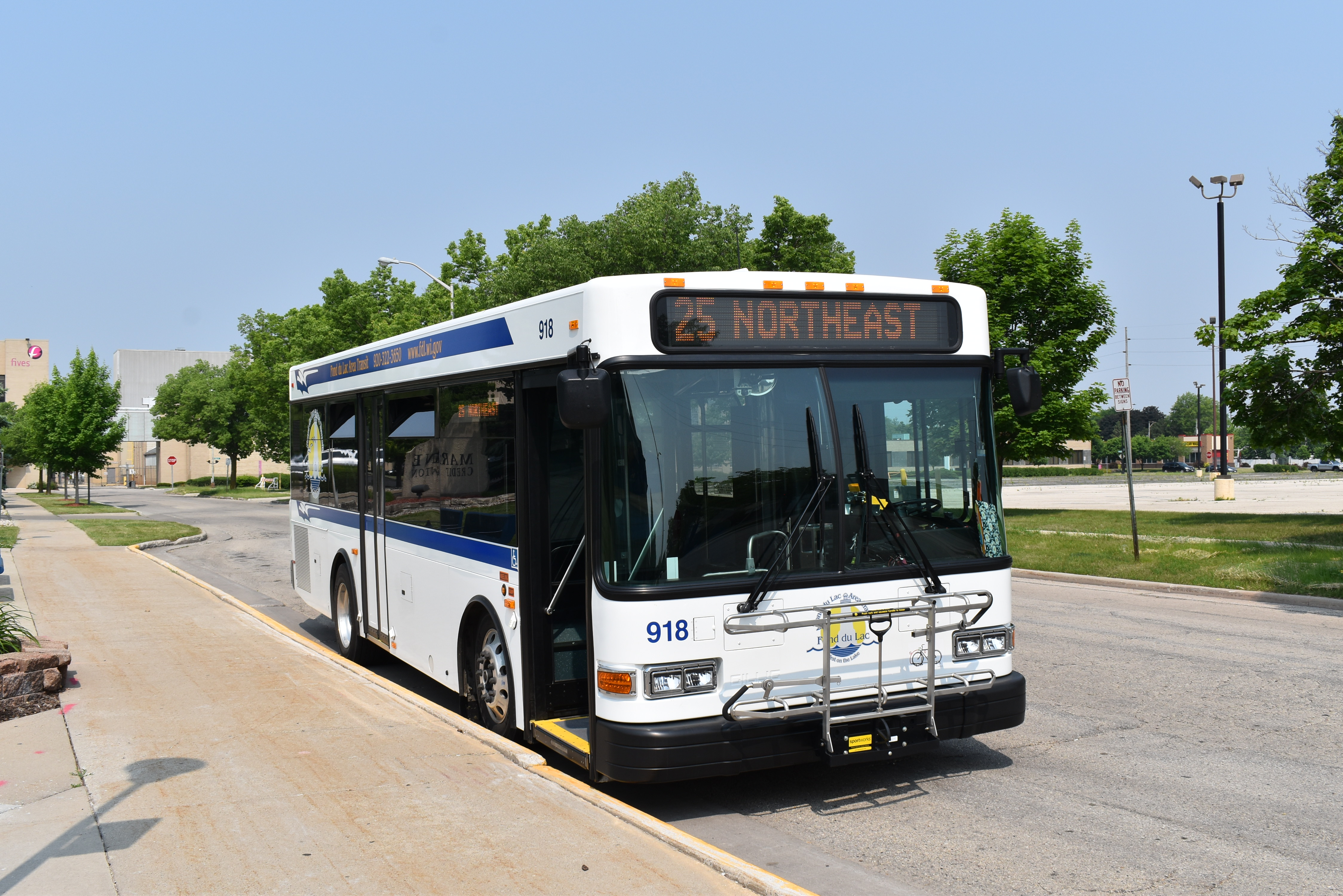
- A bus at the transfer center in June 2023
- Founded: 1973
- Headquarters: 530 N. Doty Street, Fond du Lac, Wisconsin
- Locale: Fond du Lac, Wisconsin
- Service type: Bus service, paratransit
- Routes: 8
- Fleet: 22
- Annual ridership: 120,525 (2022)
- Website: www.fdl.wi.gov/transit

Fond du Lac Area Transit is the local public transit operator for Fond du Lac, Wisconsin. The first public transit in Fond du Lac was a privately owned streetcar service in the 1880s, which transitioned to buses between 1944 and 1967. After several private operators, the bus system ceased operations in December 1967. In August 1968, the Fondy Area Bus Cooperative was established to provide bus service with the support of private citizens and businesses in lieu of a municipal one; however, it asked the city for financial support in 1970.

The current city-owned transit system began operations on January 15, 1973, following the successful passing of the referendum on November 7, 1972. It operates eight bus routes (with one of those routes operating only in the morning and afternoon to service K-12 schools), as well as a Paratransit service and taxi service for areas that the bus system does not reach.

== Ridership ==
| | Total Ridership | Change over previous year | Fixed Route Ridership | Change over previous year | Fixed Route Ridership per Vehicle Revenue Mile | Fixed Route Ridership per Vehicle Revenue Hour |
|---|---|---|---|---|---|---|
| 2013 | 212,871 | n/a | 163,810 | n/a | 1.13 | 15.08 |
| 2014 | 201,484 | ▼5.35% | 154,184 | ▼5.88% | 1.1 | 14.1 |
| 2015 | 206,193 | ▲2.34% | 159,279 | ▲3.2% | 1.1 | 14.3 |
| 2016 | 208,729 | ▲1.23% | 163,384 | ▲2.51% | 1.1 | 14.9 |
| 2017 | 200,540 | ▼3.92% | 157,952 | ▼3.32% | 0.9 | 12.1 |
| 2018 | 207,410 | ▲3.43% | 167,116 | ▲5.48% | 1.0 | 12.9 |
| 2019 | 202,688 | ▼2.28% | 164,585 | ▼1.51% | 1.0 | 12.7 |
| 2020 | 103,427 | ▼48.97% | 88,231 | ▼46.39% | 0.7 | 8.2 |
| 2021 | 99,403 | ▼3.89% | 85,635 | ▼2.94% | 0.5 | 6.7 |
| 2022 | 120,525 | ▲21.25% | 105,919 | ▲23.69% | 0.7 | 8.1 |
| 2023 | 128,302 | ▲6.45% | 113,537 | ▲7.19% | 0.7 | 8.7 |

== See also ==
- List of bus transit systems in the United States
- GO Transit
