= GO Transit (Wisconsin) =

Bus service serving Oshkosh, Wisconsin

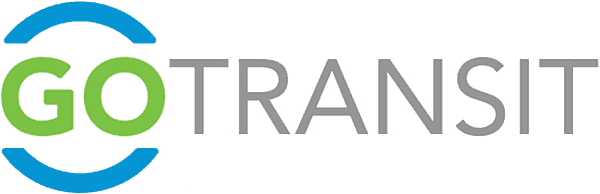
- Founded: 1978
- Headquarters: 926 Dempsey Trail
- Locale: Oshkosh, Wisconsin
- Service area: Winnebago County, Wisconsin
- Service type: bus service, paratransit
- Routes: 9
- Website: www.oshkosh.wi.us/transit

GO Transit, formerly the Oshkosh Transit System, is the primary provider of mass transportation in Winnebago County, Wisconsin. GO Transit operates nine bus routes as well as paratransit and microtransit services.

== History ==
Transit service in Oshkosh began in June 1882 when the Oshkosh Street Railway Company began operating six horse-drawn cars on 4.5 miles of track. Over the years, this system was expanded and in 1897, electric streetcars replaced the horse-drawn cars. In the 1920's buses began to replace streetcars, and the last streetcar ran on May 31, 1930. In 1933, Oshkosh City Lines, Inc. assumed operation of urban buses in Oshkosh and in 1962 City Transit Lines took over operations.

City-owned Oshkosh Transit Service began in 1978, following the takeover of the struggling private City Transit Lines. Nine routes serve the city from Monday through Saturday. Since 1999, students at the University of Wisconsin-Oshkosh have been able to ride for free. All Oshkosh Area School District students can also ride for free with a WisGo student bus pass.

The name was changed from the Oshkosh Transit System on September 17, 2012.

== Routes ==
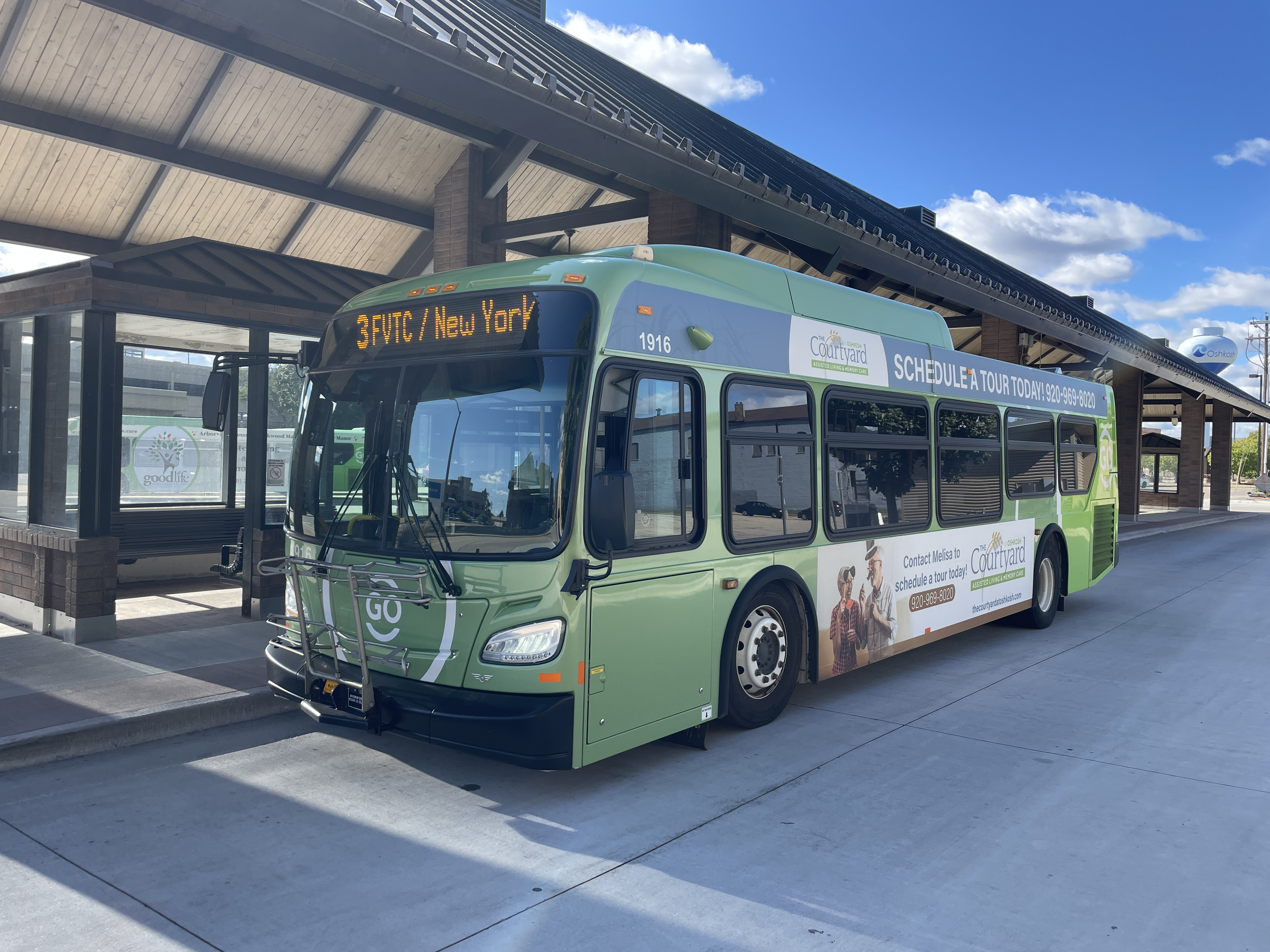
Route 3 bus laying over at the Oshkosh Transit Center.

- 1 Bowen/Hazel
- 2 Main/Jackson
- 3 FVTC/New York
- 4 Murdock/Logan
- 5 UWO/Westowne
- 6 Witzel/9th
- 7 Washburn/Koeller
- 8 20th/South Park
- 9 Oakwood

== Operating schedule ==
GO Transit operating hours are from 6:15 AM to 6:45 PM Mondays through Saturdays. There is no service on Sunday.

The University of Wisconsin-Oshkosh provides free late-night transportation to supplement GO Transit service called UWGo.

== Facilities ==
=== Oshkosh Transit Center ===
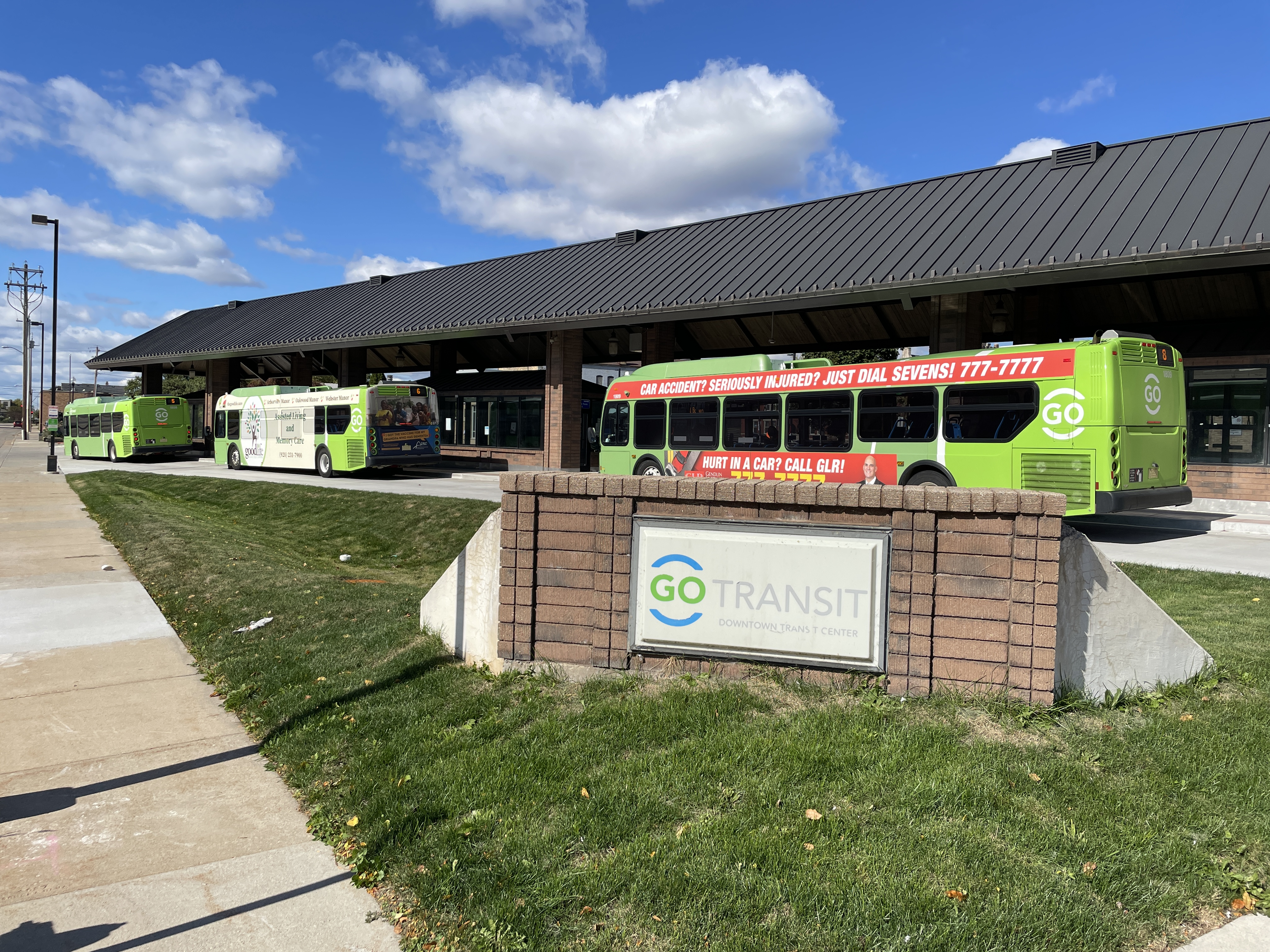
Oshkosh Transit Center during the hourly pulse time period.

The Oshkosh Transit Center is located in downtown Oshkosh, at 110 Pearl Avenue. The transit center operates as the central transfer location and serves routes 1, 2, 3, 5, 6, and 8 along with intercity buses, which serve Milwaukee, Green Bay and Wausau. The center consists of a long shelter with a metal roof. A large, enclosed heated section is located in the middle, with an enclosed, unheated section on each end. A bus lane on each side of the shelter allows ten 35-foot buses to line up at one time. Although the shelter was designed to meet federal and state guidelines for wheelchair accessibility, the passenger island was widened by four feet in 1991 to make it easier for disabled people to maneuver around support pillars.

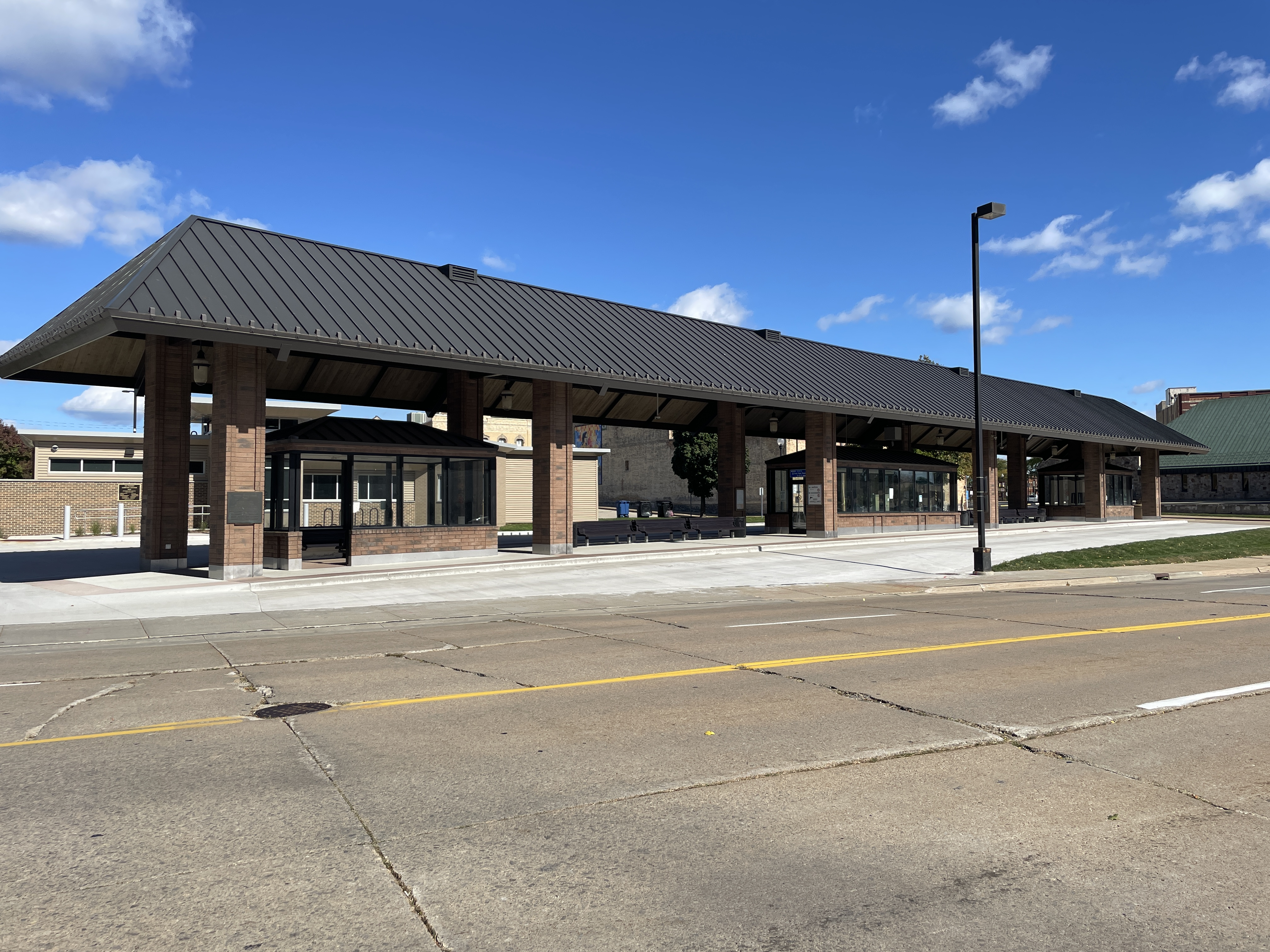
Oshkosh Transit Center as seen from the street.

The original transit center was located on the corner of Main and Waugoo where buses would line up along the street. The transit center has aged considerably and lacks crucial amenities. There are no designated public restrooms or fare kiosks. Therefore, as of 2021, GO Transit intends to make improvements to the shelter. Additions will include a supervisor's office, and a new break room for bus drivers in the employees' "comfort station," which is currently just two single-stall restrooms. Lighting and video surveillance upgrades will increase security, and updated and repainted pavement, along with improved landscaping and signs, also will improve accessibility. Plans also call for a small customer service window where riders could also purchase transport passes. However, that will only be staffed limited hours.

=== Other transfer points ===
- West Transfer Point - southside of Landmark Plaza Shopping Centre off South Washburn Street north of West 9th Avenue (Route 7 only)
- Neenah Transfer Center - 141-199 West Doty Avenue (small booth at the corner of South Church Street and West Doty Avenue)

=== Storage ===
- Transportation Department-Oshkosh Transit System Garage - 926 Dempsey Trail (off Witzel Avenue) is a bus garage and maintenance facility located south of Oshkosh Sports Complex

=== Administration ===
- Administrative Offices - 926 Dempsey Trail

== GO Plus paratransit services ==
While GO Transit buses are low floor, accessible services are available to patrons who cannot use regular bus services: Cabulance and City Cab a contractors that provide GO Plus services with accessible vehicles (cars and special vans). Cabulance and Dial-A-Ride provide after hour bus and accessible services.

== GO Connect ==
In 2023, GO Transit announced the launch of GO Connect, a microtransit service that replaced the former route 10 in transporting drivers from the Oshkosh Downtown Transit Center to the Neenah Transit Center. The service runs Monday through Saturday, 6:15 a.m. to 6:45 p.m.

== Funding ==
Fares account for 21% of the funding for GO Transit. The remaining come from local (25%), state (24%) and federal (30%) sources.

== Ridership ==
| | Ridership | Change over previous year |
|---|---|---|
| 2014 | 1,000,921 | n/a |
| 2015 | 990,439 | ▼1.05% |
| 2016 | 995,697 | ▲0.53% |
| 2017 | 981,108 | ▼1.47% |
| 2018 | 942,704 | ▼3.91% |
| 2019 | 818,919 | ▼13.13% |
| 2020 | 466,841 | ▼42.99% |
| 2021 | 520,822 | ▲11.56% |
| 2022 | 619,330 | ▲18.91% |
| 2023 | 682,421 | ▲10.19% |

== See also ==
- Valley Transit (Wisconsin) – Bus service serving Appleton, Wisconsin/Fox Cities
- Fond du Lac Area Transit – Bus service in Fond du Lac, Wisconsin
- List of bus transit systems in the United States
