= Wittman Regional Airport =

Airport in Oshkosh, Wisconsin

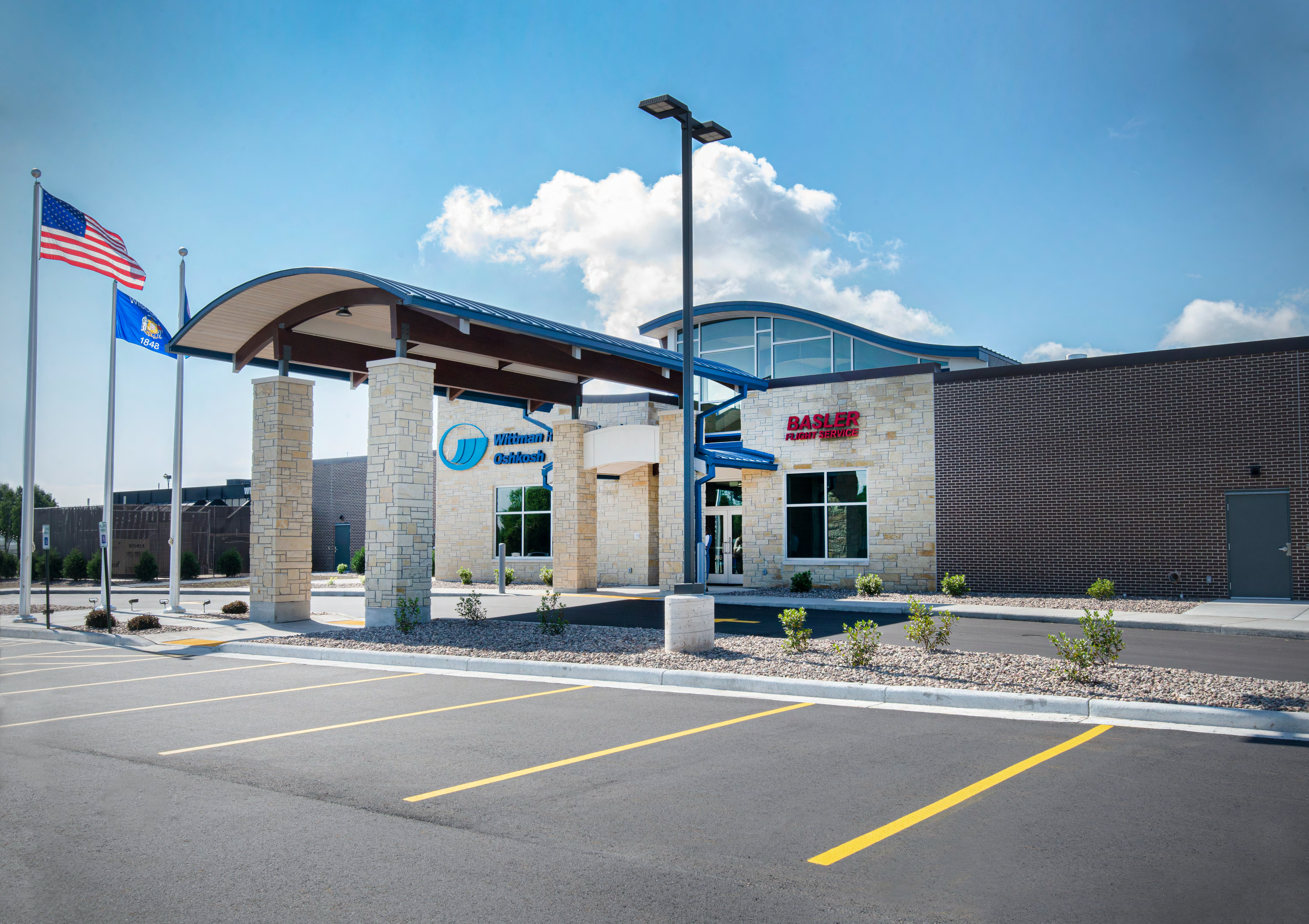
- General Aviation Terminal, built in 2021
- IATA: OSH; ICAO: KOSH; FAA LID: OSH

Summary
- Airport type: Public
- Owner/Operator: Winnebago County
- Serves: Oshkosh, Wisconsin
- Passenger services ceased: March 2003
- Time zone: CST (UTC−06:00)
  - Summer (DST): CDT (UTC−05:00)
- Elevation AMSL: 809 ft (247 m)
- Coordinates: 43°59′04″N 088°33′25″W
- Website: www.WittmanAirport.com

Maps
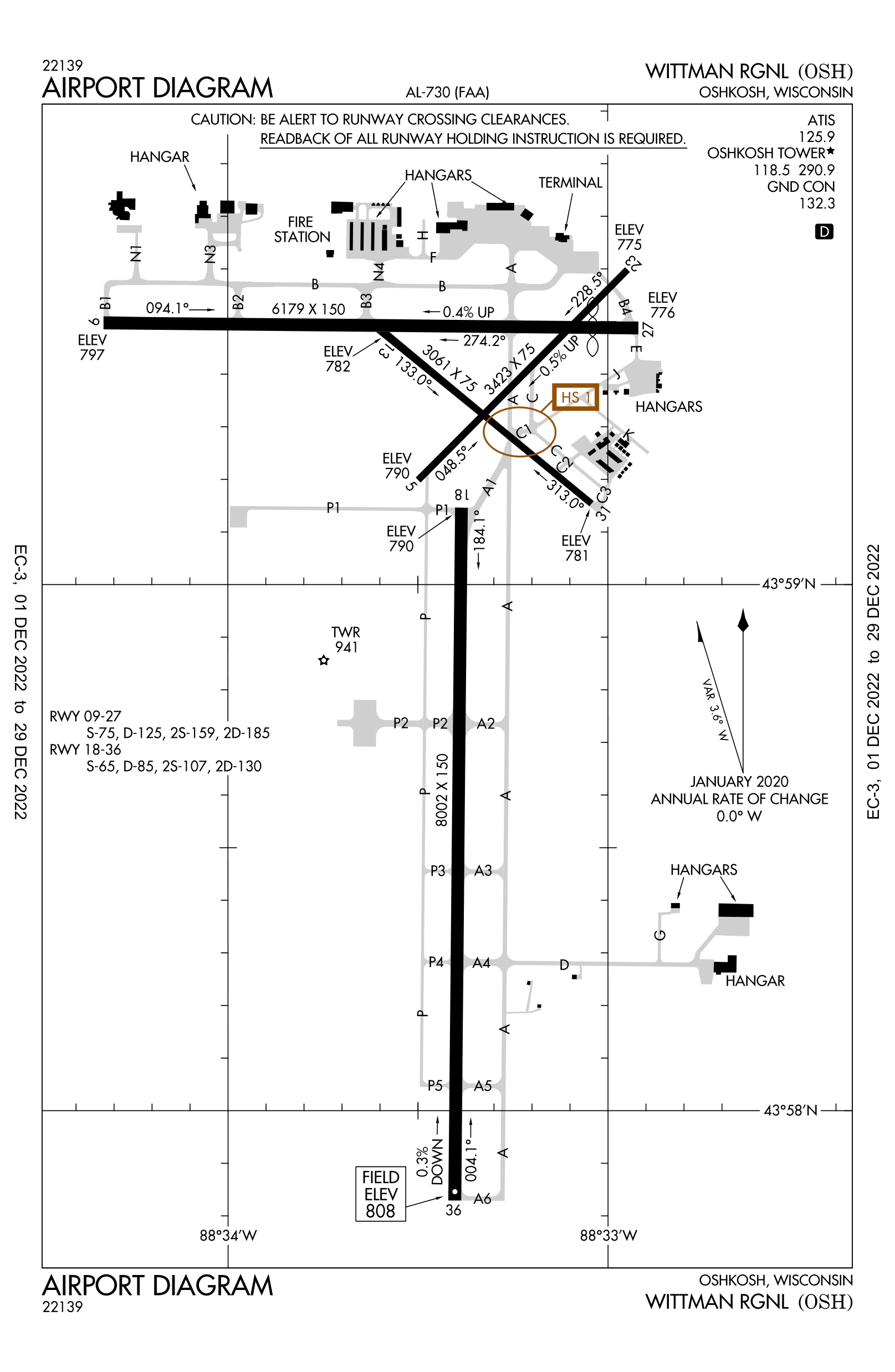
- FAA airport diagram
- Interactive map of Wittman Regional Airport

Runways
Direction	Length		Surface
Direction	ft	m	Surface
18(R)/36(L)^{a}	8,002	2,439	Concrete
9/27	6,179	1,883	Concrete
5/23	3,424	1,044	Asphalt
13/31	3,061	933	Asphalt
18L/36R (temporary)^{b}	6,300	1,920	Concrete
15/33 (temporary)^{b}	1,200	366	Turf

Statistics
- Aircraft operations (2021): 80,102
- Based aircraft (2024): 168
- Sources: FAA, and EAA^a Referred to as 18R/36L during EAA AirVenture^b Active during EAA AirVenture

Wittman Regional Airport (IATA: OSH, ICAO: KOSH, FAA LID: OSH) is a county-owned public-use airport located two nautical miles (4 km) south of the central business district of Oshkosh, a city in Winnebago County, Wisconsin, United States. A large portion at the south end of the airport is located in the town of Nekimi. It is located adjacent to Pioneer Airport, part of the EAA Aviation Museum.

It is included in the Federal Aviation Administration (FAA) National Plan of Integrated Airport Systems for 2025–2029, in which it is categorized as a national general aviation facility.

== History ==
=== Early history ===
Oshkosh Airport, Inc. was established on 11 October 1927 and the field dedicated the following day. By the end of the year, a 7,680-square-foot (713 m^{2}) hangar had been completed and a flight and maintenance school was training students. By the time Airmail service was inaugurated by Northwest Airways in December 1928, the airport was described as having a 1,320-by-2,640-foot (400 by 800 m) rectangular landing area. Preparations for the installation of a rotating beacon on a 55 tower and other lights were being made in January 1931. Two months later, Steve Wittman became airport manager and by mid May 1936, he had started a flying service. His prominence as an air racer also helped bring both a Wisconsin state air tour in September 1937 and an American Legion airshow and convention in August 1939. Meanwhile, suggestions were being made that the city should acquire the airport to enable it to become eligible for a WPA grant.

The county voted to buy the approximately 298-acre (121 ha) airfield in October 1940, making it the Winnebago County Airport. Three years later, it tentatively put forward $100,000 from its general fund to demonstrate a willingness to invest in the airport if the federal government were to do the same. However, when the money was appropriated in December, the matching local funds were deemed to not be necessary. As a result of building frustrations that led to a contentious exchange during a meeting, the chairman of the county aviation committee resigned in August 1946. The airport was dedicated on 13 October 1946. A classroom and hangar for the Mace-Wickman Company, as well as a hangar for the Kimberly-Clark Corporation, were then built.

However, the latter outgrew said hangar, and in April 1950 the county approved construction of a 9,020-square-foot (838 m^{2}) hangar for Kimberly-Clark to store a C-47 it was having converted for executive use. The company began renting the newly built hangar in February 1951, with the Marathon Corporation taking over the old one. A pair of additions to the hangar to accommodate a second DC-3 were authorized in April 1954. After initially requiring all hangars to be built and owned by the county, in September 1955, the county board changed its policy to allow the leasing of land. In the meantime, paved intersecting runways were added and by June 1953 the airport had four of them ranging from 3,640 to 4,800 feet (1,110 to 1,460 m) in length.

=== Infrastructure improvements ===
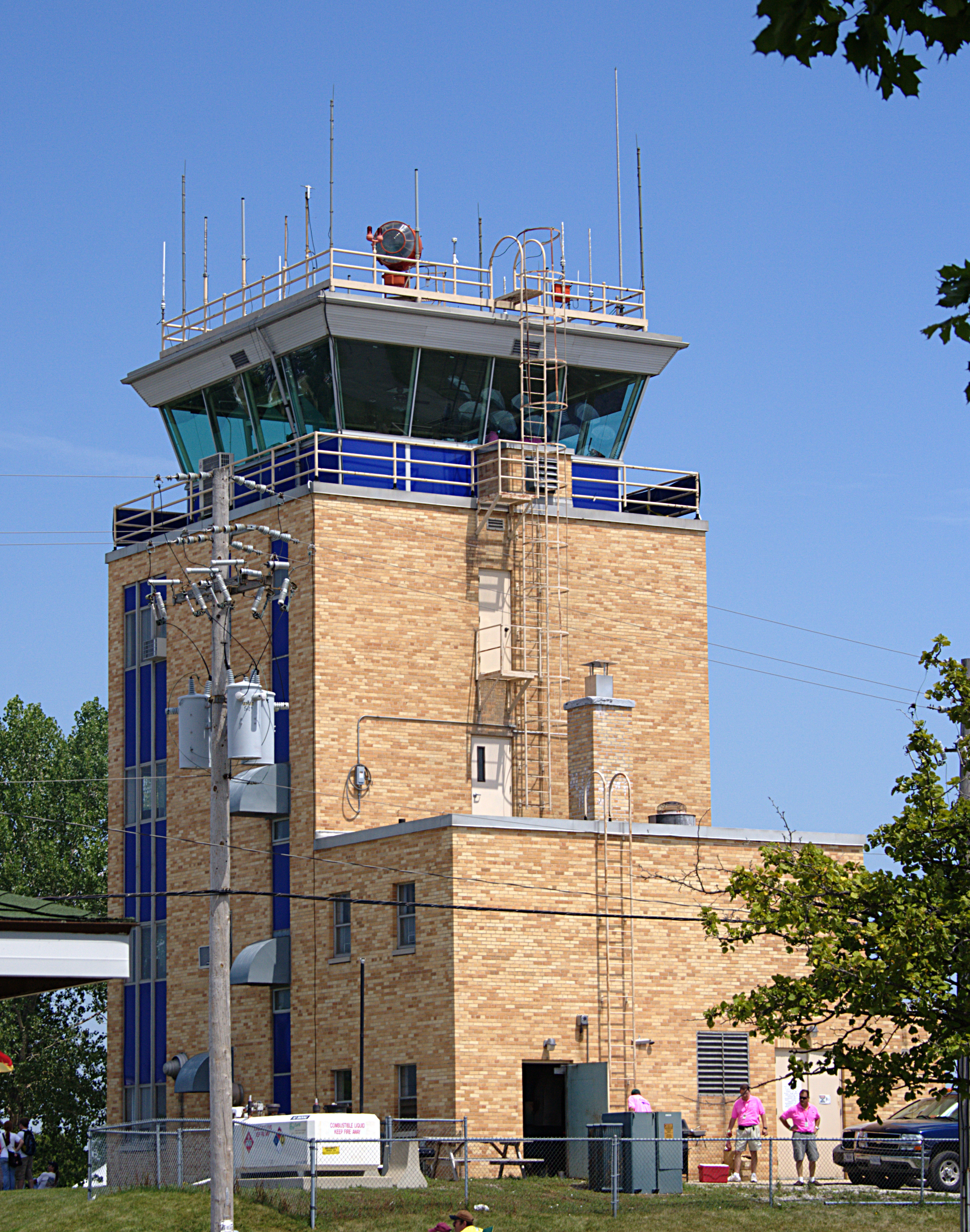
The old air traffic control tower, in use from 1962 to 2007

By 1955, the Quonset hut that was acting as a terminal building was outdated and inadequate. Therefore, after Warren Basler, a student and employee of Steve Wittman, bought the latter's flying service from him, ground was broken on a new terminal in April 1957. The new approximately 6,200-square-foot (580 m^{2}) structure and an accompanying 50,000-square-foot (4,600 m^{2}) ramp were dedicated in May 1958. A just over $300,000 project to build a control tower, extend the east-west runway, add a taxiway and make other improvements to the airport was approved by the state three months later. To do this, additional land west of Knapp Street Road was required – with 582 acres (236 ha) eventually being purchased. The county turned down a proposal for a joint airport with Outagamie County in 1960. The new control tower went into operation in May 1962 and the lengthened runway opened in November.

Although the extension increased the runway to a 6,100 feet (1,900 m) distance, before it was even completed the county had taken an option on another 108 acres (44 ha) of land to the south of the airport at the urging of a local citizens group that wanted to lengthen the north-south runway to 9,500 feet (2,900 m). (Note: Due to a displaced threshold and the installation of an instrument landing system, only approximately 5,200 feet (1,600 m) was available for landing.) Yet, in seeking federal money for the project, it again ran into conflict with the Outagamie County Airport, which also sought the "regional" designation that would accompany the funds. In 1964, the state gave preliminary approval to a budget calling for the construction of a north-south runway at the airport. However, the Federal Aviation Administration supported a plan to build a northeast-southwest runway as it would result in fewer airspace conflicts. The city, in turn, objected that such an approach would interfere with an adjacent industrial park. The county agreed with the plan for a north-south orientation, but was forced to move to purchase the land of a local asphalt company necessary for the FAA proposal. Nevertheless, the county voted to begin construction on the north-south option in November 1965.

The original plan called for simply extending the main runway to 7,000 feet (2,100 m) with the northernmost 600 feet (180 m) becoming an overrun to allow for 7,000-foot (2,100 m) takeoffs and landings from the south and north, respectively. However, by June 1966, when federal aid was approved, it had changed to building an entirely new 6,700 feet (2,000 m) runway 500 feet (150 m) to the west of it, with the old runway slated to become a taxiway. As part of the project, a historic barn was moved out of the path of the runway and the airport control tower relocated 4,600 feet (1,400 m) south. (Note: The barn, which was built in 1903 and belonged to the Stadtmueller family, would eventually become the home of the Vintage Aircraft Association.) (Note: The control tower was also placed on a new foundation that made it 15 feet (4.6 m) feet taller than at its previous site.) It also required the closing of State Route 26 and the nearby Brennan Airport.

The goal of the extension was to accommodate DC-9s operated by North Central Airlines. However, upon completion of the 6,700-foot (2,000 m) runway in 1968, the airport manager noted that the length was inadequate for a fully loaded DC-9 in certain conditions and suggested that it should be expanded to 7,500 feet (2,300 m). Just under three months after his retirement at the end of April 1969, the airport was renamed Wittman Field in honor of his 37 years as airport manager. (Note: The new airport manager, Michael T. Brock, actually took over on April 15th.)

=== Arrival of Experimental Aircraft Association ===
By 1969, Greater Rockford Airport had become too small for the Annual Convention and Fly-In of the Experimental Aircraft Association and it began searching for a new location to hold the airshow. Steve Wittman, a longtime member, suggested the organization consider Wittman Field. As a result, at the end of that year, the county agreed to host the 1970 EAA Annual Convention and Fly-In. In 1971, exactly two years after plans for the 60,720-square-foot (5,641 m^{2}) building were first presented, a new terminal was dedicated. Against the wishes of North Central Airlines, in 1973 the Civil Aeronautics Board ruled that the Official Airline Guide could no longer refer to the airport as "Oshkosh-Appleton", but simply "Oshkosh". After purchasing 10 acres (4.0 ha) from the airport almost two years prior, a 110,000-square-foot (10,000 m^{2}) U.S. Postal Service facility opened in July 1974. The Oshkosh fire department began providing service in July 1975 and a new station on the field was completed by the end of the year.

The EAA signed a 31-year lease in March 1979 to use the airport for its annual convention. The agreement called for a $622,000 investment in infrastructure by the county, including the construction of a new taxiway, two t-hangars, new drainage ditches and the paving of roads. For its part, the EAA announced plans to build a 25,000-square-foot (2,300 m^{2}) museum. Despite threats of a legal action from the Town of Algoma, Oshkosh annexed 890-acre (360 ha) to the airport in October of the following year. The EAA Museum was dedicated in July 1983 and the Pioneer Airport, a grass strip replicating a 1930s era airport located next to it, opened one year later.

Meanwhile, Air Wisconsin began flights to the airport in April 1982. Republic Airlines stopped serving the airport at the end of May 1984 and American Central Airlines, which took over from Republic, had its operating license revoked in December. As a result, boardings at the airport dropped significantly in 1985, bringing concerns that it could lose federal grants. In an attempt to reverse the trend, an advertising campaign that coincided with the start of Northwest Airlink service was begun in October 1986. By the time a new airport manager was hired in 1988, United Express had also added the field as a destination.

The north-south runway was extended to 8,000 feet (2,400 m) in 1988. In February 1989, Basler announced that it planned to build a 75,000-square-foot (7,000 m^{2}) facility to remanufacture DC-3s on the east side of the airport. One year later, production had begun and the company was offering job training due to a lack of trained workers. Then, in November 1991, Fox Valley Technical College dedicated the S.J. Spanbauer Aviation Center next door. In the meantime, the field's name had been changed to Wittman Regional Airport.

A plan announced in March 1992 suggested leasing significant portions of airport property to private industry, including for non-aeronautic purposes, to help offset the cost of operating the airport. It required relocating fourteen houses on Waukau Avenue and Knapp Street Road, including Schiefelbein Farm. Three months later, United Express announced it would be ceasing service later that year. However, this decision was reversed in October. In February 1996, the county voted to close a portion of Knapp Street Road to allow for the construction of a taxiway. Sonex, a homebuilt aircraft manufacturer, was established at the airport in 1998. A 27,000-square-foot (2,500 m^{2}) expansion of the Spanbauer Center was due to open in September 1999. The next month, the city announced the construction of an adjacent eight-unit, approximately 11,000-square-foot (1,000 m^{2}) hangar to house the school's aircraft. A fly-in community was proposed in the southeast corner of the airport in 2001. Later that year, a Hilton Garden Inn opened in the northwest corner of the airport.

=== End of airline service ===
By May 1999, passenger traffic had decreased to the point that service to the airport was no longer profitable for Great Lakes and the company announced its intention to end service. To maintain access, the airline was subsidized under the Essential Air Service program in October. However, this was ended less than two years later in March 2003, as federal law prohibited a subsidy over $200 per passenger for communities located within 210 miles of the nearest large or medium hub airport and Milwaukee Mitchell International Airport met this criterion. As a result, a joint airport authority to operate both Wittman and Outagamie airports was proposed in May.

Six months after making the temporary airport director permanent in August 2004, the county approved the new master plan developed under her tenure. A state report released the same month also cleared the airport of allegations of unfairly favoring Orion Flight Services, a fixed-base operator. By July 2006, Paccair, a cargo airline started seven years earlier, was operating eight aircraft out of the airport. In 2008, a new control tower was completed that was over twice the height of the old building. The original tower was demolished in April 2009.

After two farms with a combined area of nearly 200 acres (81 ha) adjacent to the airport became available, in March 2011 the airport made moves to ask the county to purchase them to expand its industrial park. Two and a half months later, one of the properties was abruptly dropped from the proposal, scaling back the amount of land under consideration to approximately 116 acres (47 ha). At the same time, the offer for the remaining tract had to be reappraised as it was found to be two separate parcels owned by different members of the same family. (Note: These two individuals were relatives of a member of the Winnebago County Board of Supervisors.) The county voted to purchase the parcels in November using money from a reserve fund.

An 8,000-square-foot (740 m^{2}) addition to the Spanbauer Center opened in late 2012. In 2013, for the second time in the airport's history, its terminal was found to be in need of a replacement. This time, however, the building was too large as the county could not afford to keep up with the cost of repairs and utilities. The following year, the airport began an effort to entice aviation businesses to locate on its grounds.

In 2016, the 54-year-old asphalt Taxiway B was being rebuilt with concrete pavement and moved to create a fully straight alignment. As it involved changes to the same area, the project was timed to coincide with the installation of a new storm sewer to relieve flooding problems at the northern end of the airport. However, after airport officials neglected to seek financial support from the state, a plan to build a new airport terminal was rejected the following year. The airport received a federal grant in September 2019 to rebuild and widen Taxiway A. The airport began a project in July 2020 to replace the old general aviation and airline terminals with a modern general aviation terminal. The high cost to maintain both facilities, as well as the lack of airline service, meant the two facilities could be replaced with a single building. The new $5.5 million terminal was dedicated in June 2021.

A plan to build 20 t-hangars on the east side of the airport was unveiled in February 2023. The two 10-unit hangars, the first in 28-years, were completed by August 2025. Renderings for a proposed 80-acre (32 ha) business park to the southeast of the airport called Oshkosh Aviation Park were released in July 2026. A project to build an additional 35 hangars on the northeast portion of the field was announced later that week.

== Facilities and aircraft ==
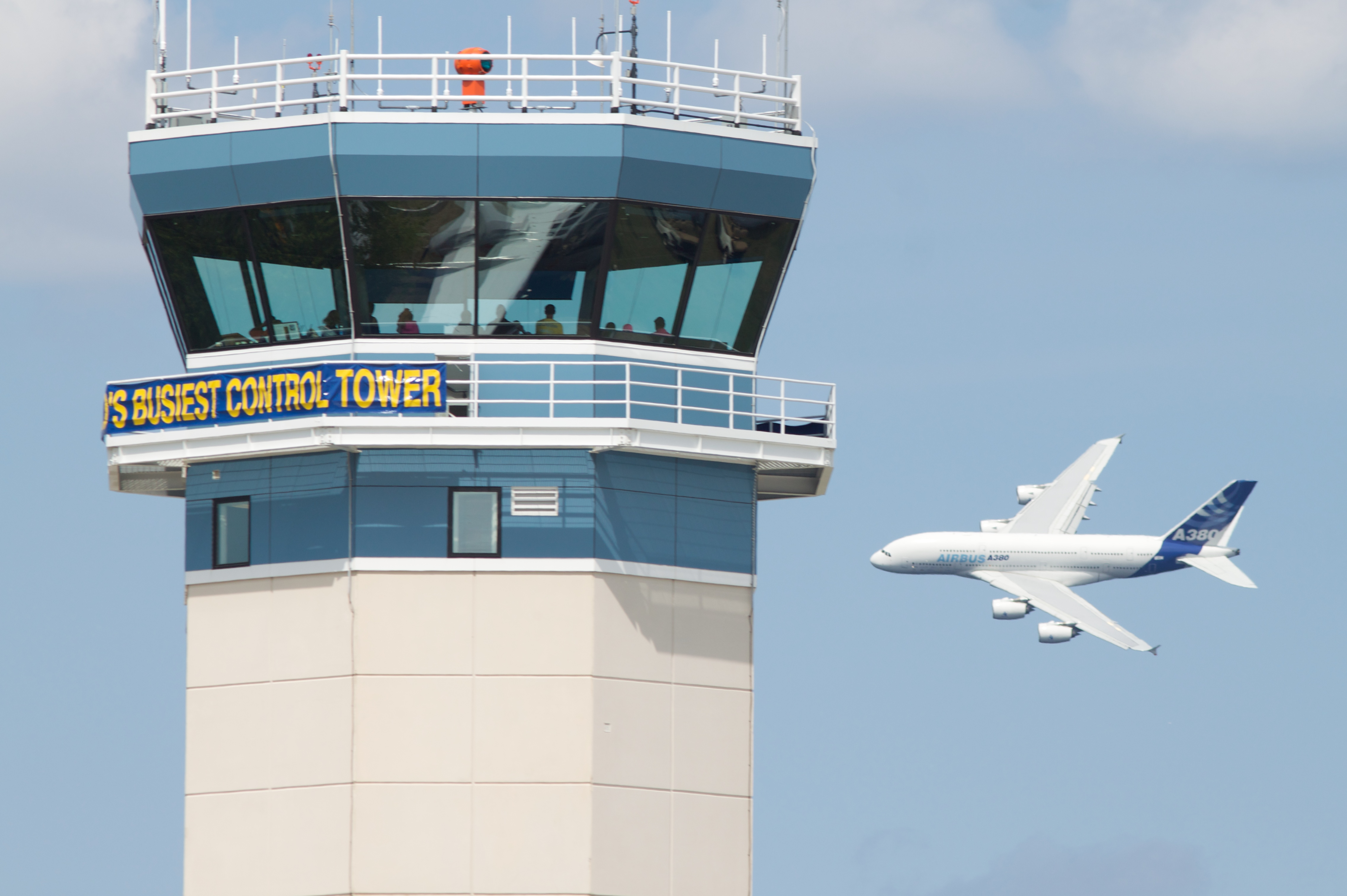
The new air traffic control tower with a banner stating its status as the "[World]'s Busiest Control Tower" due to the large number of aircraft movements during AirVenture. An A380 is visible in the background.

Wittman Regional Airport covers an area of 1,392 acres (563 ha) at an elevation of 809 feet (247 m) above mean sea level. It has four paved runways: 18/36 is 8,002 by 150 feet (2,439 x 46 m); 9/27 is 6,179 by 150 feet (1,883 x 46 m); 5/23 is 3,424 by 75 feet (1,043 x 23 m); 13/31 is 3,061 by 75 feet (933 x 23 m).

During EAA AirVenture Oshkosh, two additional temporary runways are in operation to accommodate the high volume of traffic of numerous aircraft sizes and types: a portion of Taxiway A to the east of runway 18/36 becomes Runway 18L/36R (Runway 18/36 is re-designated 18R/36L and shortened to 6,700 feet) and a small grass runway (1,200 x 100 feet (366 x 30 m)) on the southern end of the airport is used to host ultralight aircraft. Runways 5/23 and 13/31 are closed during AirVenture. A series of differently colored dots on the two main runways allow multiple aircraft to perform landings on them at the same time during the show.

For the 12-month period ending December 31, 2021, the airport had 80,102 aircraft operations, an average of 219 per day: 97% general aviation, 3% air taxi and less than 1% military, though the EAA AirVenture airshow accounts for a large number of the annual operations. In July 2024, there were 168 aircraft based at this airport: 129 single-engine, 27 multi-engine, 11 jet and 1 helicopter.

EAA operates the Kermit Weeks Flight Operations Center at the airfield for the maintenance, overhaul and restoration of its Ford Trimotor, B-17, B-25 and other aircraft. The airport also has three flight schools: Aviation Services, Discover Flight, and Fox Valley Technical College.

Located between the airport and the EAA grounds are a three-block subdivision and the Sacred Heart Cemetery. An additional one-street subdivision, which includes two homes with access to the runway, is sited on the southeast corner of the airport. Similarly, a Hilton Garden Inn in the northwest corner of the airport includes a neighboring ramp for guests. In addition, the adjacent Oshkosh Corporation leases airport property to park newly manufactured vehicles, such as M-ATVs and HEMTTs, before they are delivered to customers.

== Operations ==
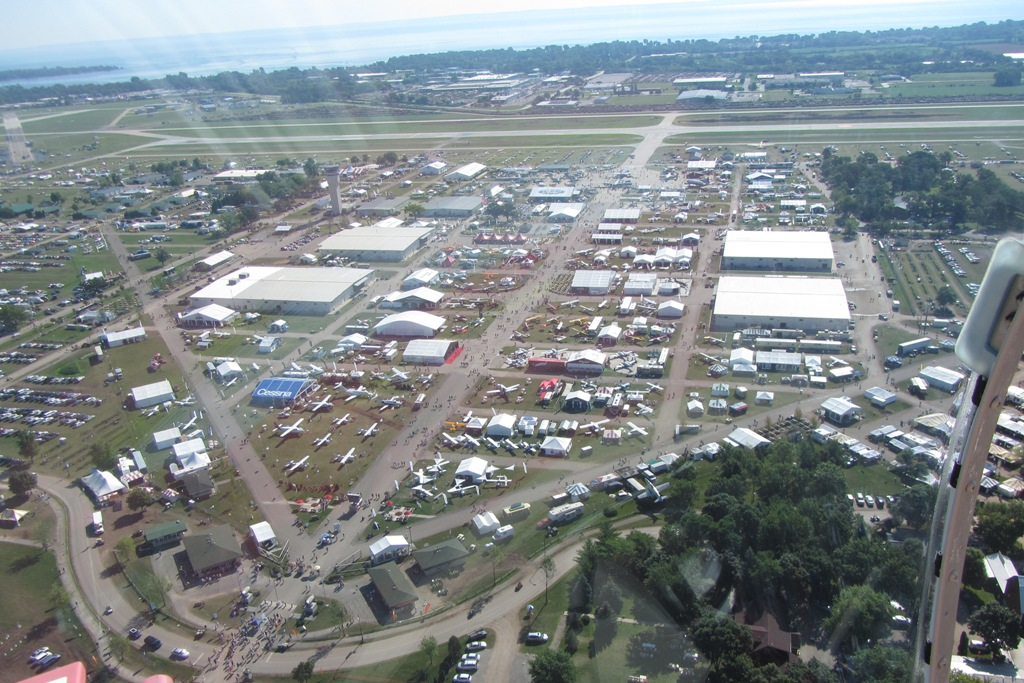
2011 EAA Airventure airshow

The airport is the site of the annual Experimental Aircraft Association's AirVenture Oshkosh, an experimental aircraft and sport aviation airshow held in late July since 1953. Across Knapp Street to the west lies the campus of the EAA AirVenture Museum. For the week of the airshow, Wittman Regional is the world's busiest airport by traffic movements.

== Access ==
Public transit service to the airport is provided by Route 8 of GO Transit.

== Airlines and destinations ==
Airlines	Destinations
Freight Runners Express	Milwaukee, Rhinelander, Sheboygan

Freight Runners Express offers scheduled cargo service from the airport.

== Accidents and incidents ==
- On 22 April 1928, a biplane crashed near the airport, killing a passenger and seriously injuring the pilot and another passenger. (Note: Although the aircraft is reported as having crashed roughly a mile south of the airport, this would place it well within the modern footprint of the airport.)
- On 14 April 1995, a Cessna 150 and a Beechcraft V35B Bonanza collided over the airport, killing all four on both airplanes.

== See also ==
- List of airports in Wisconsin
