= Short snorter =

Banknote signed by fellow travelers, common during WWII

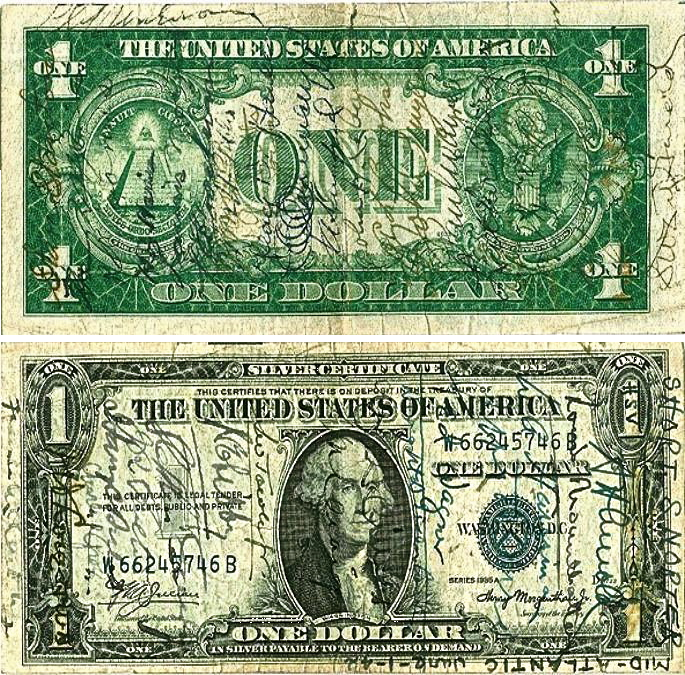
General Hoyt Vandenberg's $1 short snorter

A short snorter is a banknote inscribed by people traveling together on an aircraft. Sometimes a series of banknotes, of different currencies, are joined together. The tradition was started by Alaskan bush flyers in the 1920s and spread through the military and commercial aviation. During World War II short snorters were signed by flight crews and conveyed good luck to passengers crossing the Atlantic. Friends would take the local currency and sign each other's bills creating a keepsake of their friends' signatures.

The General Hoyt Vandenberg short snorter was started in June 1942 on a flight over the mid-Atlantic. The Harry Hopkins short snorter was collected on July 25, 1942, by an aide of Franklin D. Roosevelt at a London conference. The D. Ray Comish short snorter was collected January 1943 at the Casablanca Conference during transit on the Dixie Clipper. The Averell Harriman short snorter was collected by him at the January 1943 Casablanca Conference, and the General George S. Patton snorter signatures were also collected at the Casablanca Conference. The Yalta Conference short snorter signatures were collected on February 4–11, 1945 by Steve Early at Yalta, on the Crimean Peninsula.

== Etymology ==
Merriam-Webster defines a short snorter as either "a member of an informal club for which a pilot, crew member, or passenger who has made a transoceanic flight is eligible"; or "a piece of paper money (as a dollar bill) endorsed by short snorters as a membership certificate for a new member." "Snort" is slang for a "mixed drink," and "short" specifies less than a full measure.

According to a November 2002 article in The Numismatist, "About 100 years ago, a 'short snort' was a slang expression for less than a full shot of liquor. Pouring short snorts guaranteed barkeepers a little extra profit in each bottle. Also, drinking only a short snort allowed the imbiber to honestly point to his moderation. Years before federal aviation regulations, pilots discovered that alcohol and airplanes do not mix, and fly-boys who drank heavily did not live long. Soon, pilots jokingly were calling each other 'short snorter'."

== History ==
The tradition is believed to have been started in August 1925, by bush pilots in the Alaska Territory, United States, spreading through the United States military during World War II. When the short snorter was signed, the collector would have to produce it upon request and, if not, they were bound to give the signer a drink. Short snorters sell on eBay and at other auction venues.

During World War II reunions, short snorters were often compared by veterans. John McGarry, executive director of the Lakeshore Museum Center in Muskegon, Michigan, said that every short snorter is "unique because every soldier's story is different."

=== Short Snorter Project ===
In March 2009, Thomas Sparks founded the Short Snorter Project, an American 501(c)3 tax-exempt nonprofit organized and registered in Washington "for educational purposes" pertaining to short snorters. One aspect of the Project's mission is "to illuminate the Short Snorter and those associated with the tradition and provide a means to educate the general public about these artifacts brought home from the war."

== Notable short snorters ==
=== General Hoyt Vandenberg short snorter ===
Collector	Date	Location	Ref
General Hoyt Vandenberg	June 1942	Over the mid-Atlantic.	

Front

- General H.H. "Hap" Arnold
- Admiral Louis Mountbatten
- W. Averell Harriman
- John Tower
- Ted Wagner
- Dwight D. Eisenhower
- Unidentified
- Unidentified
- S.W. Tower, Jr.
- Stephen Early
- Maj. Gen. Charles P. Gross
- J.D. Love, Press
- Unidentified
- Colonel Frank McCarthy

Back

- Stan Stanton
- (rest) Unidentified

=== Harry Hopkins short snorter ===
Collector	Date	Location	Ref
Aide of Franklin D. Roosevelt	July 25, 1942	London Conference	

Front

- Arlene Dreznal
- H.R. Alexander
- Louis Mountbatten
- George S. Patton, Jr.
- Robert D. Murphy
- Ross T. McIntire
- John McCrae
- F. J. Terry

Back

- Anthony Eden
- Dwight D. Eisenhower
- Averell Harriman
- Stephen Early
- Harry Butcher
- Kathleen Harriman
- Anthony Biddle
- Winston Churchill
- Stan Stanton
- Hal Blackburn
- H.C. Loomis
- Hoyt S. Vandenburg
- J.D. Love
- George Durno
- F. Langer
- J.B. Olendorf
- Franklin D. Roosevelt
- D. Ray Comish
- G.A. Bisbee
- Elliott Roosevelt

=== D. Ray Comish short snorters ===
Collector	Date	Location	Ref
D. Ray Comish	January 1943	Dixie Clipper flight	

Front

- Franklin D. Roosevelt
- Harry Hopkins
- Greg H. Spaman
- Chas. W. Fredericks
- Arthur S. Prettyman
- John McCrae
- Ross T. McIntire
- Arthur C. Black
- E. R. Hipsley
- William D. Leahy
- Gladys Gayle
- Leon Henderson

Back

- Shannon Douglas
- Allen George Shamas
- (rest) Unidentified

=== Averell Harriman short snorter ===
Collector	Date	Location	Ref
Averell Harriman	January 1943	Casablanca Conference	

Front

- Brehon Somervell
- W. H. Wilbur
- George S. Patton, General
- Sir Harold Macmillan
- Hastings Ismay

Back

- George C. Marshal
- Charles Portal
- H.H. "Hap" Arnold
- Ernest J. King
- Sir Dudley Pound
- Franklin Roosevelt
- Winston Churchill
- Elliott Roosevelt
- Sir Alan Brooke
- Louis Mountbatten
- Harold Alexander

=== General George S. Patton short snorter ===
Collector	Date	Location	Ref
General George S. Patton	Unavailable	Casablanca Conference	

Front

- George C. Marshall
- Henry H. Arnold
- Elliott Roosevelt
- Lord Louis Mountbatten
- Harry Hopkins
- W. Averell Harriman
- Michael F. Reilly
- John G. Dill
- Unidentified
- Manton S. Eddy
- Ned Dickson
- Omar N. Bradley

Back

- E. F. Van Doren
- Peter Ross
- Unidentified
- Wilber Kaslow
- Norman D. Cota

=== Yalta short snorter ===
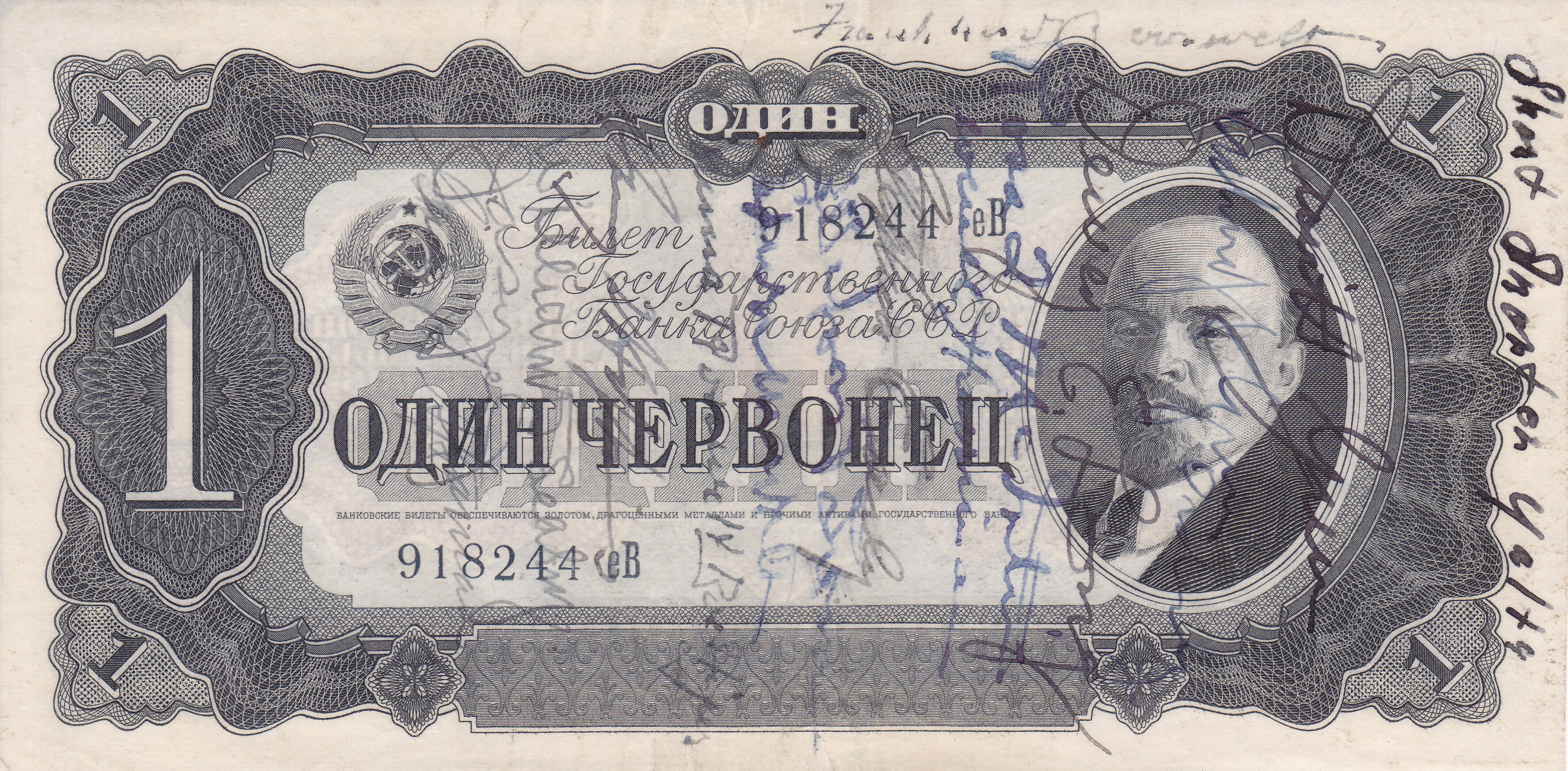
1 Chervonets bank note signed by Franklin D. Roosevelt and his team at the Yalta Conference in February 1945

Collector	Date	Location	Ref
Steve Early	February 4–11, 1945	Casablanca Conference	

Front

- Edward Stettinius
- Ross McIntyre
- Edward Slayman
- Harry Hopkins
- James Byrnes
- William Leahy
- Unidentified
- Anna Roosevelt Boettiger

Back

(No Signatures)

=== Other short snorters ===
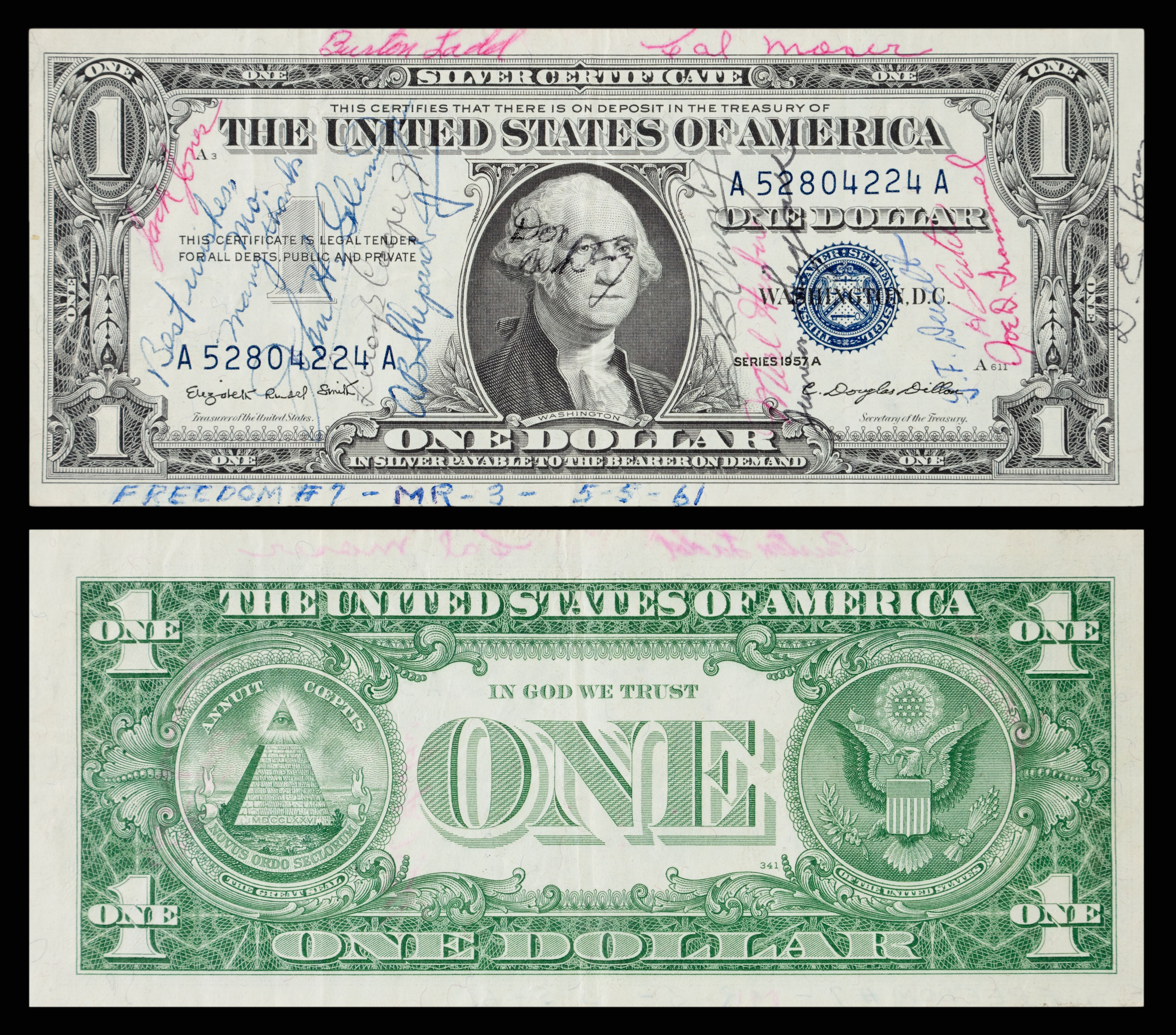
A 1957-A $1 Silver certificate short snorter flown in 1961 on Freedom 7 by Alan Shepard
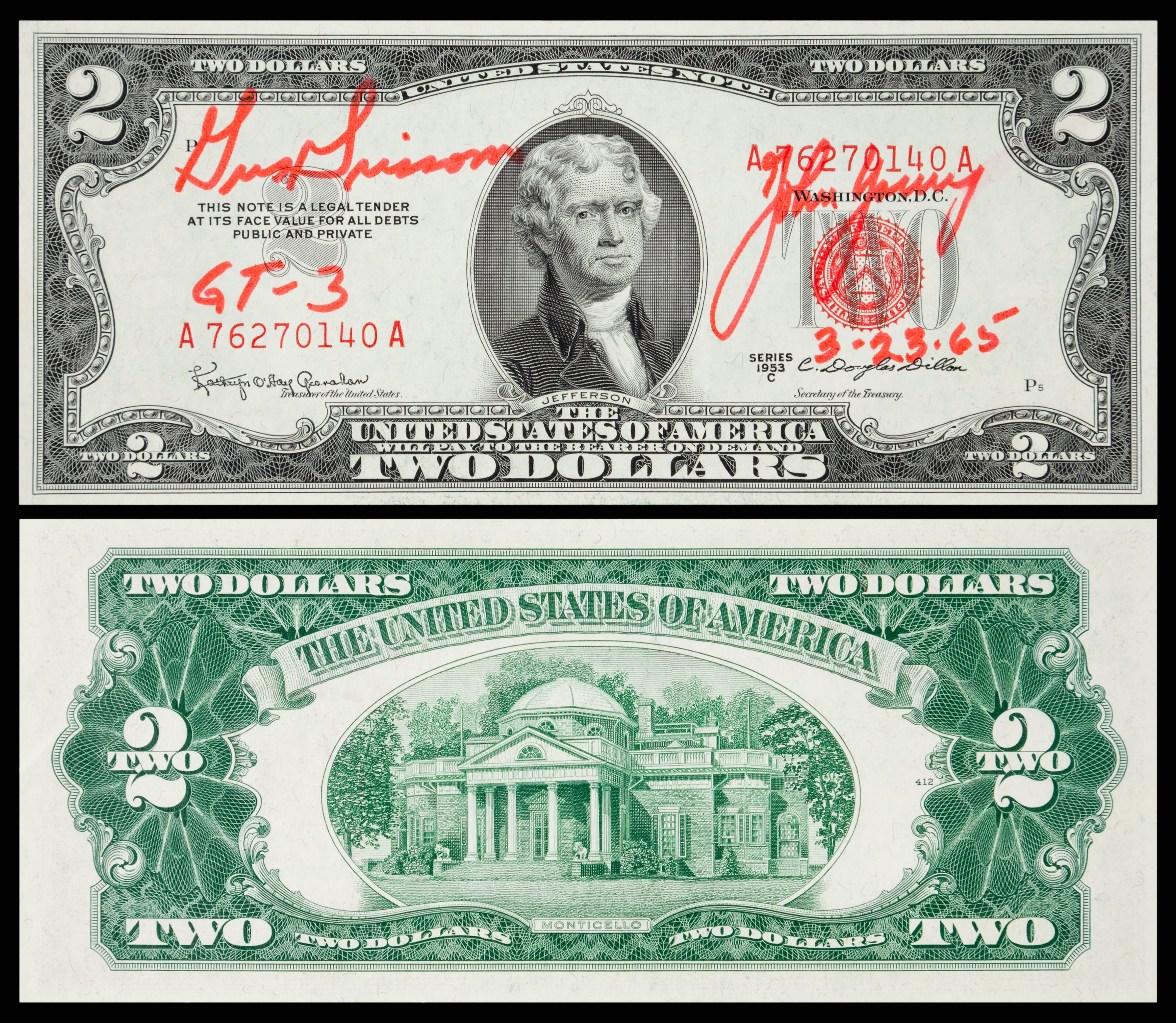
A 1953 $2-bill carried on the 1965 Gemini 3 mission and signed by Gus Grissom and Young

Short Snorter signed by Franklin D. Roosevelt

Collector	Date	Location	Ref
Unavailable	November 22, 1943	Tehran Conference	

It was signed by Franklin Roosevelt and various key advisors.

A Fiji 5 shilling note is another example of a short snorter owned by Eleanor Roosevelt and signed by Maj. Robert Arnoldus. This same short snorter was later signed by Col. Ed Whitcomb, another of the first class of celestial navigators, class 40-A, taught by Charlie Lunn of Pan Am airlines in Florida. That first class also included celestial navigator 2Lt Louis Gustav Moslener, Jr, one of the first American casualties of WW-II when the first bombs fell on Hickam Field, 7 Dec 1941.

Marlene Dietrich short snorter

The actress Marlene Dietrich had a short snorter consisting of 83 pieces of currency signed by more than 1,000 dignitaries including Irving Berlin, Ernest Hemingway, and George S. Patton. This short snorter was sold at auction for $5,200 on November 7, 2017.

First Experimental Aircraft Association short snorter

The first short snorter in Experimental Aircraft Association (EAA) history was signed by founders Paul Poberezny and Stan Dzik and presented to Robert D. Blacker on February 14, 1958, at St. Rita of Cascia High School in Chicago, in order to commemorate Mr. Blacker's creating the organization's first junior chapter, his co-founding of Project Schoolflight, and his building of both the "Spirit of Cascia" Baby Ace and the EAA Biplane airplanes.

=== Space-flown snorters ===
Numismatic souvenirs have accompanied astronauts on early spaceflights. Mercury astronauts carried small light-weight mementos on their missions, often in the form of US coins or banknotes. On the first sub-orbital flight (Mercury-Redstone 3), Alan Shepard carried with him four one-dollar silver certificates which were subsequently signed by him, other Mercury astronauts, and support staff. John Glenn, piloting the first crewed U.S. orbital spaceflight Mercury-Atlas 6, also carried several one-dollar silver certificates.

Space-flown numismatic items are also known for early Gemini missions. On the first crewed Gemini flight (Gemini 3), Gus Grissom and John Young brought 50 two-dollar bills.

== Sources ==
- Gibbs, William T. (6 May 2013). "Collecting the Final Frontier". Coin World. 54. Amos Publishing: 4–5, 14, 18, 20, 22, 24, 26, 30, 34, and 38.
