= Sport Aviation (magazine) =

Aviation magazine

- Chief Editor: Jim Busha
- Categories: Aviation magazine
- Frequency: Monthly
- Circulation: 160,000
- Publisher: Jack J. Pelton
- Founder: Paul and Audrey Poberezny
- First issue: February 1953 (as Experimenter)
- Company: Experimental Aircraft Association
- Country: United States
- Language: English
- Website: www.eaa.org/eaa/news-and-publications/eaa-magazines-and-publications/eaa-sport-aviation-magazine
- ISSN: 0038-7835
- OCLC: 2450785

Sport Aviation is an aviation magazine published since 1953 starting as The Experimenter. The content focuses on experimental homebuilding of aircraft and general aviation topics, including antique, war, and classic aircraft.

== History ==
In 1953 the Experimental Aircraft Association (EAA) released a two-page newsletter named The Experimenter. The newsletter was written and published by founding members Paul and Audrey Poberezny along with other volunteers. It quickly changed to a magazine format published by Times Publishing (Random Lake, Wisconsin). The Experimenter was renamed to Sport Aviation but the name was reused in 2012 for the new EAA online magazine focusing on homebuilt aircraft. Sport Aviation became a benefit of membership in the organization.

EAA Experimenter ended its publications in May 2015. This free online magazine focused on homebuilt aircraft, which debuted in September 2012. This magazine is now integrated with EAA Sport Aviation, and featured in its own separate Experimenter section since July 2015.

EAA spun off sister publications to complement its sub-organizations. These include

- EAA Sport Aviation - The flagship magazine of EAA
- Sport Aerobatics Magazine
- Warbirds Magazine
- Vintage Airplane Magazine
- EAA Airventure Today - A daily newspaper distributed for eight days at the annual EAA AirVenture Airshow in Oshkosh
