= NASA space-flown Gemini and Apollo medallions =

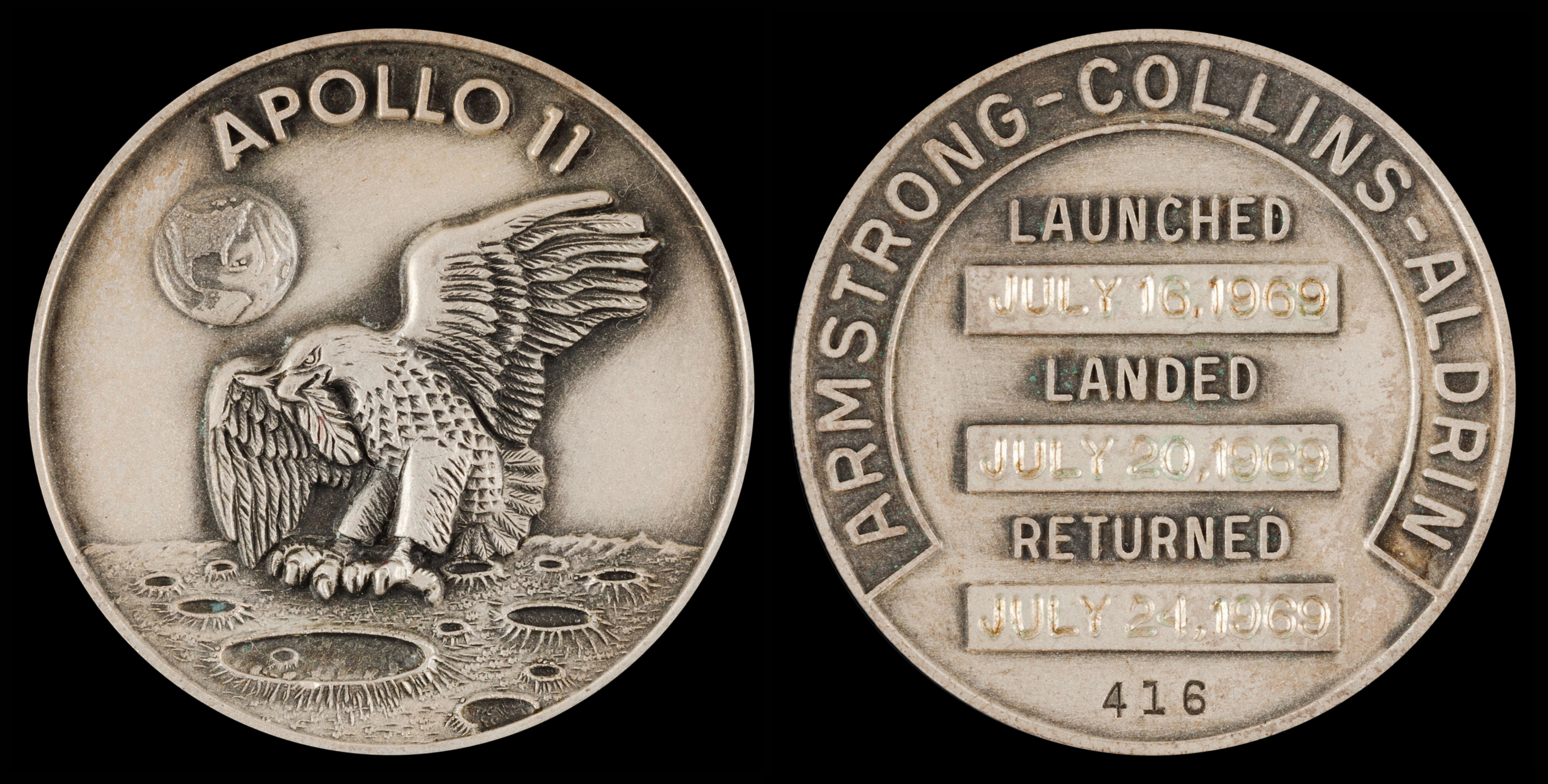
Apollo 11 space-flown silver Robbins Medallion from the first spaceflight to land on the Moon. Presented to Wally Schirra by Neil Armstrong.

NASA space-flown Gemini and Apollo medallions were mission-specific commemorative medallions, often astronaut-designed, which were approved by NASA and carried aboard the mission spacecraft into orbit. Beginning with the first crewed Gemini mission in 1965, commemorative medallions were prepared for the astronauts at their request. These were produced by a company only known as Fliteline and were struck either in a pewter-colored base metal, sometimes painted a gold color, or sterling silver, and were flown on all 10 crewed Gemini missions. A Fliteline medallion was designed and produced for Apollo 1, but was never officially flown after a disastrous cabin fire during a launch rehearsal killed the flight crew.

The Robbins Company of Attleboro, Massachusetts, was contracted in 1968 to produce commemorative medallions beginning with Apollo 7, the first crewed Apollo flight since the Apollo 1 disaster. These were purchased by astronauts and support crew personnel at NASA Astronaut Flight Office, and a total of over 3,000 sterling silver Robbins medallions were flown into space across the 12 crewed flights of the Apollo program. Some of these were later sold in public auction for up to $60,000. The basic elements of the medallion design are consistent throughout the 12 medallions in the series, with the main design element and the mission name on the obverse, mission dates on the reverse, primary flight crew names on either the obverse or reverse, and a serial number either on the lower reverse or on the rim. A very small number of Apollo Robbins medallions were also struck in 14k gold, generally ordered by the mission crew as a personal memento. Sterling silver Robbins medallions have continued to be struck for every crewed NASA spaceflight, including Skylab and Space Shuttle missions. (Note: Robbins medallions were also struck for the crews of the Expeditions to the International Space Station. Medallions for the first nine expedition crews (2000–04) have been documented.)

== Space-flown numismatic items ==
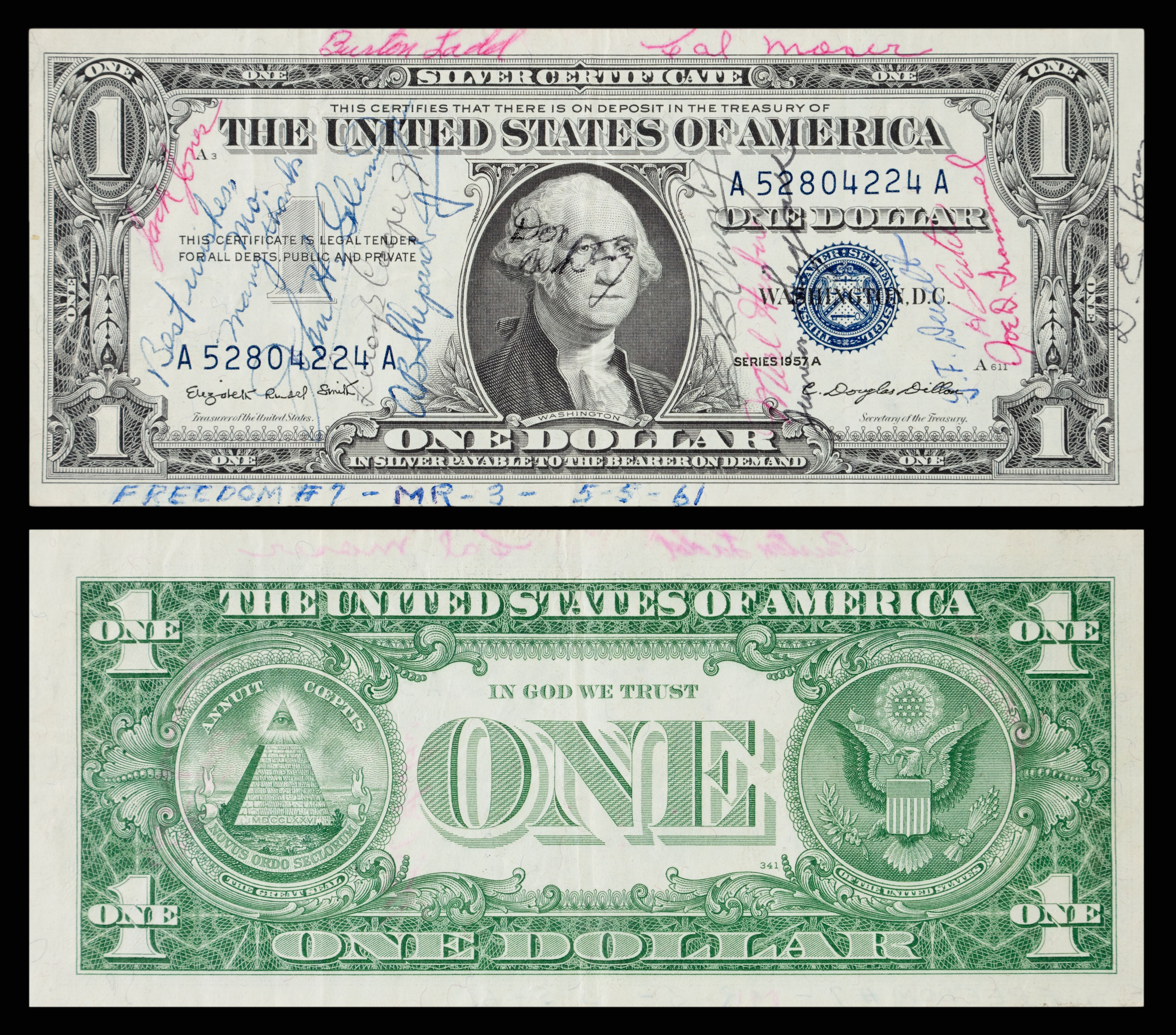
A 1957-A $1 Silver certificate short snorter flown in 1961 on Freedom 7 by Alan Shepard.
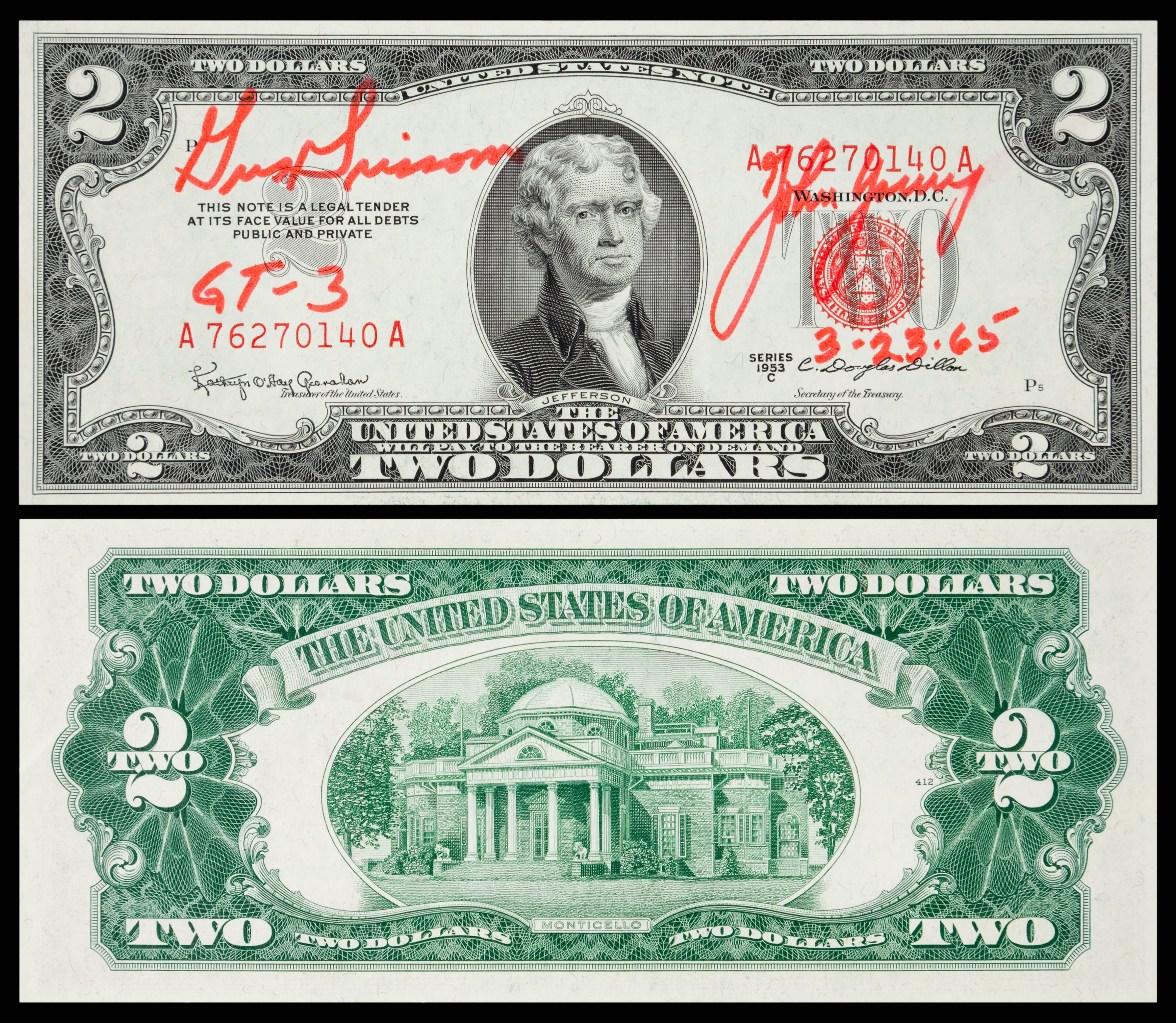
A 1953 $2-bill carried on the 1965 Gemini 3 mission and signed by Gus Grissom and John Young

Numismatic souvenirs have accompanied astronauts on nearly every early spaceflight. Mercury astronauts carried small, lightweight mementos on their missions, often in the form of US coins or banknotes. On the first sub-orbital flight (Mercury-Redstone 3), Alan Shepard carried with him four one-dollar silver certificates which were subsequently signed by him, other Mercury astronauts, and support staff becoming short snorters. A number of Mercury dimes were flown aboard Mercury-Redstone 4 in 1961, being recovered with the capsule from the Atlantic Ocean in 1999. John Glenn, piloting the first crewed U.S. orbital spaceflight Mercury-Atlas 6 also carried several one-dollar silver certificates.

Space-flown numismatic items are also known for early Gemini missions. On the first crewed Gemini flight (Gemini 3), Grissom and Young brought 50 two-dollar bills. Young also made history for smuggling "contraband" on board the flight, in the form of a corned-beef sandwich. Other currencies have been taken to space as well; in 2014, Chris Hadfield made history with the first unveiling of a new currency design in space when he revealed the new design for the Canadian five-dollar note aboard the International Space Station.

== Gemini mission space-flown Fliteline medallions ==
Beginning with the first crewed Gemini mission in March 1965, commemorative medallions were prepared for the astronauts at their request. It is unclear who prepared these early medallions, only that each individual box containing a medallion bore the word "Fliteline". It is unknown how many gold and silver colored medallions were prepared for each mission, and how many were space-flown versus unflown. Fliteline medallions were prepared for each of the crewed Gemini flights, as well as the ill-fated Apollo 1 mission.

Gemini mission space-flown Fliteline medallions (Note: All of the Fliteline medallions illustrated in the table are space-flown and their individual histories can be seen under the provenance column notes.)
| Mission | Date (Note: Launch and return dates are listed for Gemini and early Apollo missions. Three dates indicates launch, lunar landing, and return. Column sort function is keyed to launch date.) | Medallion | Size | Provenance (Note: Provenance indicates the name of the astronaut who possessed the medallion in their own collection, or the astronaut who flew the medallion and then presented it as a gift to a fellow astronaut or someone associated with NASA.) |
|---|---|---|---|---|
| Gemini 3 | 23 Mar 1965 | Gemini 3 mission emblem and crew names (front). Flight date (back) | 26 mm (1.0 in) | Gordon Cooper |
| Gemini 4 | 3 Jun 1965; 7 Jun 1965 | Gemini 4 mission emblem and crew names (front). Flight dates (back) | 25 mm (0.98 in) | Ed White |
| Gemini 5 | 21 Aug 1965; 29 Aug 1965 | Gemini 5 mission emblem and crew names (front). Flight dates (back) | 25 mm (0.98 in) | Not reported |
| Gemini 6A | 15 Dec 1965; 16 Dec 1965 | Gemini 6 mission emblem and crew names (front). Flight dates (back) | 25 mm (0.98 in) | Wally Schirra |
| Gemini 7 | 4 Dec 1965; 18 Dec 1965 | Gemini 7 mission emblem and crew names (front). Flight dates (back) | 25 mm (0.98 in) | Frank Borman to Joe Garino |
| Gemini 8 | 16 Mar 1966; 17 Mar 1966 | Gemini 8 mission emblem and crew names (front). Flight date (back) | 25 mm (0.98 in) | David Scott to Joe Garino |
| Gemini 9A | 3 Jun 1966; 6 Jun 1966 | Gemini 9 mission emblem and crew names (front). Flight dates (back) | 30 mm × 20 mm (1.18 in × 0.79 in) | Gene Cernan |
| Gemini 10 | 18 Jul 1966; 21 Jul 1966 | Gemini 10 mission emblem and crew names (front). Flight dates (back) | 25 mm (0.98 in) | John Young |
| Gemini 11 | 12 Sep 1966; 15 Sep 1966 | Gemini 11 mission emblem and crew names (front). Flight dates (back) | 20 mm × 30 mm (0.79 in × 1.18 in) | Jack Lousma |
| Gemini 12 | 11 Nov 1966; 15 Nov 1966 | Gemini 12 mission emblem and crew names (front). Flight dates (back) | 25 mm (0.98 in) | Jim Lovell to Joe Garino |

== Apollo mission space-flown Robbins medallions ==
The Robbins Company was founded in 1892 by jeweler Charles M. Robbins, in Attleboro, Massachusetts. They began designing and producing commemorative badges for Ohio in 1913, and South Dakota in 1917. In 1935, the first 1,000 badges of a new design for the Federal Bureau of Investigation were produced by Robbins. The Robbins Company also struck the Olympic medals for the 1932 Winter Games in Lake Placid, New York.

=== Robbins medallions ===
The Apollo 1 cabin fire in January 1967 put crewed spaceflight on hold. The crew of Apollo 7, designated to be the return to crewed spaceflight, began working with the Robbins Company later in 1967 to produce commemorative mission medallions. Commissioned by the NASA Astronaut Flight Office (AFO), the medallions were financed entirely through the orders placed by astronauts and support crew personnel. Only those directly affiliated with the AFO were eligible as purchasers, and they were bound by their employment contract not to commercialize the medallions, as NASA was concerned about any appearance that the astronauts might profit from the flown medallions.

One (or more) of the astronauts from the flight crew worked directly with the Robbins Company to design the mission medallion. The basic elements of the medallion design are consistent throughout the Project Apollo series. The main design element along with the mission name is located on the obverse. The names of the flight crew can be found on either the obverse or reverse. The mission dates are located on the reverse. Beginning with Apollo 11, special fields were designed for the reverse of the medallion that allowed for engraved dates of launch, lunar landing, and return. Also on the reverse (or sometimes the edge) is the medallion serial number. The size of most Robbins Apollo medallions falls roughly between a current US quarter (24.3 mm (0.96 in)) and a Kennedy half dollar (30.6 mm (1.20 in)).

The medallions were struck in sterling silver two to three months prior to the scheduled mission, though it is unclear whether serial numbers were added pre or post-flight. The medallions were stored in the Command Service Module during flight and on missions involving a lunar landing, a small number were brought to the lunar surface aboard the Lunar Module. The flown medallions were returned to the Robbins Company after the flight to have the dates engraved and for a final polishing. Except where noted, all medallions struck for Apollo 7–14 were flown, and serial numbers for Apollo 14–17 medallions appear on the rim.

For Apollo 13 due to the accident during the mission and the last minute crew change of Jack Swigert replacing Ken Mattingly three days prior to launch, the Apollo 13 Robbins medallions flown aboard the mission were melted down and reminted after the mission to reflect the correct crew, and the absence of a lunar landing date.

Apollo Robbins medallions were also struck, in very small numbers, in 14k gold. (Note: Gold medallions struck and flown: Apollo 7 (5–7), Apollo 8 (3), Apollo 9 (3), Apollo 10 (4), Apollo 11 (3), Apollo 12 (7), Apollo 13 (6), Apollo 14 (6), Apollo 15 (6), Apollo 16 (5), and Apollo 17 (6).) These medallions were generally ordered by the mission crew as a personal memento of their flight and were often taken to the lunar surface in the Landing Module. For the duration of the Apollo program, Robbins medallions (3–7 gold and 80–450 silver per mission) were flown into space.

Apollo mission space-flown Robbins medallions (Note: All of the Robbins medallions illustrated in the table are space-flown and their individual histories can be seen under the provenance column notes.)
| Mission | Date | Medallion | No. flown (struck) (Note: Flown medallions were placed on board the mission vehicle and achieved either Earth or lunar orbit. A very small number were taken to the lunar surface. This column represents only the number of silver medallions struck.) | Size | Design | Provenance |
|---|---|---|---|---|---|---|
| Apollo 1 | (Note: The Apollo 1 medallion was struck by Fliteline, not Robbins. It is presented with the Robbins medallions because of the Apollo project grouping.) | Apollo 1 mission emblem (front). Apollo 1 crew names, Apollo 9 flight dates (back) | 8 (unk) | 31 mm (1.2 in) | Unknown | (Note: Flown on Apollo 9 by Jim McDivitt and presented to the family of Ed White.) |
| Apollo 7 | 11 Oct 1968; 22 Oct 1968 | Apollo 7 mission emblem and crew names (front). Flight date and serial number 186 (back) | 255 (Note: Walt Cunningham had 45 sterling silver re-strikes made in the 1970s, numbered 256–300.) | 32 mm (1.3 in) | Walter Cunningham | Rusty Schweickart |
| Apollo 8 | 21 Dec 1968; 27 Dec 1968 | Apollo 8 mission emblem and crew names (front). Flight dates and serial number 264 (back) | 300 | 38 mm × 30 mm (1.5 in × 1.2 in) | Jim Lovell | Rusty Schweickart |
| Apollo 9 | 3 Mar 1969; 13 Mar 1969 | Apollo 9 mission emblem (front). Crew names, flight dates, and serial number 260 (back) | 350 | 25 mm (0.98 in) | McDivitt, Scott, Schweickart | Jim McDivitt (Crew Commander), presented to Wally Schirra |
| Apollo 10 | 18 May 1969; 26 May 1969 | Apollo 10 mission emblem and crew names (front). Flight dates and serial number 70 (back) | 300 | 29 mm × 31 mm (1.1 in × 1.2 in) | Stafford, Young, Cernan | Rusty Schweickart |
| Apollo 11 | 16 Jul 1969; 20 Jul 1969; 24 Jul 1969 | Apollo 11 mission emblem (front). Crew names, dates (launch, lunar landing, and return), and serial number 416 (back) | 440 (450) (Note: Serial number 160–69 (the only unflown Apollo 11 medallions) were missing prior to the flight but later turned up in the estate of a NASA maintenance worker.) | 28 mm (1.1 in) | Michael Collins | Neil Armstrong (Crew Commander), presented to Wally Schirra |
| Apollo 12 | 14 Nov 1969; 19 Nov 1969; 24 Nov 1969 | Apollo 12 mission emblem and crew names (front). Dates (launch, lunar landing, and return), and serial number 1 (back) | 262 (Note: Apollo 12 medallions serial number 1–82 were struck using a silver ingot recovered from the Spanish Plate Fleet. They were not stamped as sterling. Numbers 83–262 are stamped sterling.) | 32 mm (1.3 in) | Unknown | Pete Conrad (Crew Commander), presented to Jim Rathmann |
| Apollo 13 | 11 Apr 1970 abort 17 Apr 1970 | Apollo 13 mission emblem and crew names (front). Flight dates and serial number 354 (back) | 400 (Note: Due to both a last minute crew change (Swigert for Mattingly) and the need to abort landing on the lunar surface, the original Apollo 13 flown medallions were returned to the Robbins Company, melted, and re-struck with the flown metal using a new die.) | 32 mm (1.3 in) | Apollo 13 crew with Lumen Martin Winter | Rusty Schweickart |
| Apollo 14 | 31 Jan 1971; 5 Feb 1971; 9 Feb 1971 | Apollo 14 mission emblem and crew names (front). Dates (launch, lunar landing, and return) (back) | 303 | 35 mm × 30 mm (1.4 in × 1.2 in) | Apollo 14 crew with Jean Beaulieu (Note: Jean Beaulieu was an artist for the Kennedy Space Center.) | Rusty Schweickart |
| Apollo 15 | 26 Jul 1971; 30 Jul 1971; 7 Aug 1971 | Apollo 15 mission emblem and crew names (front). Dates (launch, lunar landing, and return) and landing site (back) | 127 (304) (Note: An ingot of silver from the Spanish Plate Fleet was added to the sterling used to make all 304 Apollo 15 medallions.) (Note: Apollo 15 medallions 1–6 were gold-plated.) | 35 mm (1.4 in) | Based on a design by Emilio Pucci | Rusty Schweickart |
| Apollo 16 | 16 Apr 1972; 20 Apr 1972; 27 Apr 1972 | Apollo 16 mission emblem and crew names (front). Dates (launch, lunar landing, and return) (back) | 98 (300) | 35 mm (1.4 in) | Apollo 16 crew with Barbara Matelski (Note: Barbara Matelski was an artist for the Johnson Space Center.) | John Young (Crew Commander) |
| Apollo 17 | 7 Dec 1972; 11 Dec 1972; 19 Dec 1972 | Apollo 17 mission emblem and crew names (front). Dates (launch, lunar landing, and return) and landing site (back) | 80 (300) | 35 mm (1.4 in) | Apollo 17 crew | Unknown |
| Apollo Soyuz | 15 Jul 1975; 24 Jul 1975 | Apollo-Soyuz Test Project mission emblem and crew names in English and Russian (front). Dates (launch and entry) (back) | 93 (192) | 35 mm (1.4 in) | Unknown | Rusty Schweickart |

== Robbins Apollo medallions at auction ==
Despite the NASA prohibition on commercializing the medallions, since 1995 there have been over 500 internet or live auction appearances of Apollo mission Robbins medallions. Two auction companies account for a majority of the sales: Heritage Auctions (over 200 since 2007) and RR Auction (over 100 since 2011). Between both auction companies, the top 10 prices realized range from US$30,000 to nearly $62,000, all for sterling silver medallions from either Apollo 11 or Apollo 17. A gold Robbins medallion from the Apollo 11 mission that belonged to astronaut Neil Armstrong sold for over $2 million in July 2019.
