= Gere Sport =

Sport Biplane

General information
- Type: Light recreational aircraft
- Manufacturer: Homebuilt
- Designer: George E. Gere, Jr

History
- First flight: 1932

The Gere Sport was an American single-seat sport biplane of the 1930s. Designed for amateur construction by George E. Gere Jr. (known as Bud Gere) while a young student at the University of Minnesota. It was later used as the basis of the 1960s EAA Biplane.

== Design and development ==
The Sport had a lightweight welded steel construction fuselage. The wings employed two solid wood spars each, with spruce leading edges. All structures were fabric covered. Only the lower wing had ailerons and only they were mounted with a moderate upward angle (dihedral); a typical arrangement. The conventional landing gear was rigid and relied on large balloon tires to absorb impacts. The spring steel tailskid came from a front leaf spring from a Ford Model T. The sport had an open single-seat cockpit with a one-piece transparent windscreen. The prototype was fitted with a 19 hp Chevrolet 4-cylinder water-cooled automobile engine.

The 19-year-old Gere was killed in a January 1931 accident with an ice sled; he slipped and fell into the propeller arc. At the time of his death the propeller and engine cowlings still needed to be fitted and the aircraft had not been flown. Gere's father, George Gere Sr., with some of his son's friends, completed the aircraft. The Sport first flew in 1932 from Wold-Chamberlain Airport, piloted by Elmore Wall, a test pilot for the Mohawk Aircraft Company. Although underpowered with the Chevrolet, it was reputed to have flown well. After testing, the original Gere Sport was passed on to the University of Minnesota.

A set of plans for the Sport was published in the October 1932 issue of Modern Mechanix and Inventions, which called it the Gere Sport Biplane and advertised the full blueprints for $5. The magazine touted the plane's ability to run with a range of Ford and Chevrolet engines, and sold conversion kits so builders could adapt the designs to their engine. Plans appeared the following year in the 1933 Flying Manual, copies of which remain available through the Experimental Aircraft Association (EAA), based in Oshkosh, Wisconsin. It is believed at least three other aircraft were built near that time.

== Aircraft on display ==
An example of a Gere Sport is held in the collections and is on display at the Museum of Transport and Technology in New Zealand.

== Specifications (typical) ==
Data from

General characteristics

- Crew: One
- Airfoil: U.S. 27
- Propellers: 2-bladed Right-hand tractor propeller
