= Clermont County Airport =

Airport in Ohio, United States

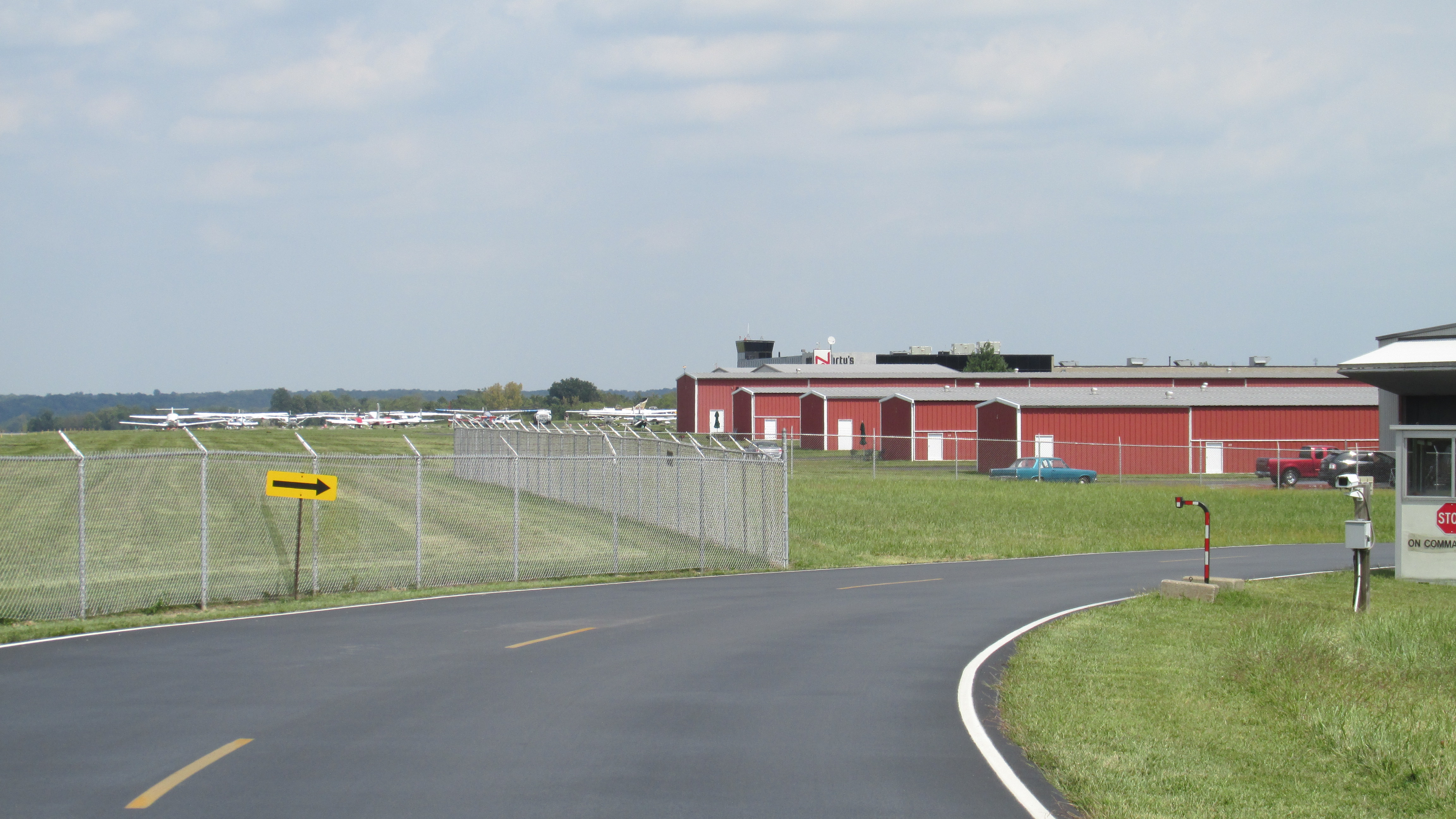
- IATA: none; ICAO: none; FAA LID: I69

Summary
- Airport type: Public
- Owner/Operator: Clermont County Commissioners
- Serves: Clermont County, Ohio
- Location: Batavia, Ohio
- Time zone: UTC−05:00 (-5)
  - Summer (DST): UTC−04:00 (-4)
- Elevation AMSL: 844 ft (257 m)
- Coordinates: 39°04′42″N 084°12′37″W
- Website: www.flyeca.com

Map
- Location of airport in Ohio I69 (the United States)

Runways
Direction	Length		Surface
Direction	ft	m	Surface
4/22	3,568	1,088	Asphalt

Statistics (2021)
- Aircraft operations: 36,865
- Based aircraft: 97
- Source: Federal Aviation Administration

Clermont County Airport (FAA LID: I69) is a public use airport located 2 nautical miles (3.7 km) west of the central business district of Batavia, a village in Clermont County, Ohio, United States. It is owned by the Clermont County Commissioners.

It is also known as Sporty's Airport. The fixed-base operator is Eastern Cincinnati Aviation. The Tri-State Warbird Museum is located on the west side of the airport. The 279th Composite Squadron of the Civil Air Patrol is headquartered at the airport as well. The Experimental Aircraft Association, which has a chapter at the airport, operates Young Eagles rides at the airport, where volunteer pilots give kids ages 8-17 free rides in airplanes.

== History ==
Sites for a potential airport were being scouted in early January 1966. In early October 1967, a group called Clermont Industrial Parks sought to have over 200 acres (81 ha) of land around the airport that it had purchased rezoned to create an industrial park. An additional 41 acres (17 ha) was donated to the county in early January 1968. Later that month, the Ohio Mechanics Institute requested funds from the state to consider the creation of an aviation college adjacent to the airport. Following the success of its effort, CIP and seven other petitioners requested an additional 669 acres (271 ha) be rezoned industrial as well. Other plans called for the creation of a nearby 7,500-acre (3,000 ha), 50,000 resident community called Grant Park. (Note: The project began when Gerald Lach, a preacher with the United Methodist Church, proposed using $100,000 of church money to buy land in Clermont County. After being turned down, he continued the effort with private investors.)

Dedicated on October 13, 1968, the airport was managed by the husband and wife team of Randolph and Rosalie Burchett from the early 1970s through 1986. Less than a month after dedication, ground was broken on construction of a maintenance hangar and administration building. In 1971, Sporty's Pilot Shop moved from its previous location to the airport. (Note: Sporty's was founded in 1959 by two Cincinnati Milling Machine Company employees, Hal Shevers and Russ Falk.) By early March 1972, the airport had acquired an airport beacon and was anticipating the certification of an instrument approach service. Later that year, the Clermont General and Technical College opened on land one-half mile from the airport. Plans for a 10,150 sq ft (943 m^{2}) hangar were announced that same year, and by June, a new taxiway had been constructed. (Note: A plan to move a 5,760 sq ft (535 m^{2}) six unit t-hangar to the site from Lunken Airport in May. However, it is not clear if this is meant to take the place of the larger hangar or refers to a second structure.) Work on a master plan started in 1977. In 1978, the airport was cited as a motivating factor for Ford's choice to locate a transmission plant in nearby Afton. In 1986, the county announced plans to seek a state grant to improve infrastructure at the airport. The bid, which would include a financial donation from fixed-base operator Sportsman's Market, included the possibility of construction of a new terminal building. Eastern Cincinnati Aviation, Sporty's parent company, took over the airport lease at the end of 1987. (Note: The same year, a proposal was made to relocate to relocate the Blue Ash Airport to Goshen, where it would sit astride the Clermont-Warren county line.) It soon proposed building a parallel taxiway on the east side of the airport, as well as a pilot's shop. However, the plan would prevent future efforts to extend the runway. The county commissioners authorized the lengthening of a taxiway from 1,600 feet (490 m) to 3,400 feet (1,000 m) in October 1989.

In 1990, Sporty's built a new facility at the airport. Plans to build a 128-unit apartment complex adjacent to the airport were rejected by the zoning board in 1993. After turning down a proposal to lengthen the runway to 5,000 ft (1,500 m) in 1994, consideration was given to a reduced extension of 4,000 ft (1,200 m) instead. In 1995, the radio station WNWC began broadcasting from the airport. By October 2006, the first of a number of "hangar homes" had been constructed at the airport. Four years later, only three homes were occupied and the larger fly-in community paradigm had come under criticism by the FAA.

In early 2011, the owner of the airport's fixed-base operator proposed extending the airport's runway. In mid-2013, discussions were ongoing regarding the possibility of extending the runway. By early 2014, the county was attempting to buy the land necessary for the runway extension. The Clermont County Transportation Improvement District board voted to approve the runway extension on January 15, 2016. In early 2017, the runway extension plan needed approval from the Federal Aviation Administration. However, by February 2018 it had been cancelled.

A plan to build housing units across a road from the southwest end of the runway met with opposition from the AOPA in 2021. A proposal to transfer land for a second development immediately adjacent to the east of the airport from Batavia Township to the Village of Batavia was denied by the Clermont County Board of Commissioners in November 2023. However, despite significant public complaint, the plan to build just under 800 homes was approved by the city's zoning board in September 2024. A subsequent meeting of the village council a few days later again saw overwhelmingly negative response. Issues included the potential for future noise complaints and the provision for a tax abatement that would result in local services caring for additional residents without a corresponding increase in funding. The following December the CEO of Sporty's filed a referendum to put the development on the 2025 village ballot. However, the referendum was invalidated when the ordinance was rescinded and then reapproved by the village council as an emergency measure. The village zoning board approved the development in August 2025, but by that point a pair of lawsuits regarding the process had been filed.

== Facilities and aircraft ==
Clermont County Airport covers an area of 60 acres (24 ha) at an elevation of 844 feet (257 m) above mean sea level. It has one runway designated 4/22 with a 3,568 x 75 ft (1,088 x 23 m) asphalt surface.

The airport is served by four instrument approaches, including an RNAV (GPS) approach to both runway 4 and 22.

Local television station WCPO operates a doppler weather radar at the airport. An airport viewing area is near the southwest edge of the airport. The airport viewing area has a small playground area and several tables, and is located south of the runway 4 threshold. The aircraft upholstery shop Air Mod is based at the airport.

The airport has a fixed-base operator that sells fuel. It offers services such as avionics maintenance, hangars, and courtesy transportation and amenities such as conference rooms, vending machines, pilot supplies, a crew lounge, showers, and more.

For the 12-month period ending August 24, 2021, the airport had 36,865 aircraft operations, an average of 101 per day: 98% general aviation, 2% air taxi and <1% military. This is up from 30,650 in 2007. In 2021, there were 97 aircraft based at the airport: 85 single-engine and 8 multi-engine airplanes, 3 helicopters, and 1 jet.

== Accidents and incidents ==
- On 17 August 1973, two airplanes collided in mid-air while attempting to land at the airport. Both landed safely.
- On 20 June 1978, a Mooney Cadet crashed while attempting to land at the airport, injuring the pilot and a passenger.
- On 15 August 1998, a Beechcraft Bonanza crashed near the airport after an aborted approach, killing the pilot. The probable cause of the accident was found to be the pilot's loss of control in flight due to spatial disorientation.
- On 28 October 2001, a Grumman American AA-1 crashed shortly after taking off from the airport.
- On 30 June 2003, a Raytheon B36TC Bonanza overran the runway following an emergency landing at the airport.
- On 6 July 2004, a Grumman American AA-1 crashed shortly after taking off from the airport, injuring the pilot and a passenger.
- On 11 April 2005, a Cessna 152 crashed near Mount Orab, Ohio after taking off from the airport, killing an instructor and student.
- On 8 December 2011, a Curtiss P-40M Kittyhawk overran the runway on landing following an engine failure.
- On 13 December 2011, an airplane overran the runway on takeoff due to a blown tire.
- On 12 April 2014, an Avid Flyer crashed on a golf course in Withamsville, Ohio after taking off from the airport.
- On 5 July 2015, an Aviat Husky crashed in Pierce Township after taking off from the airport.
- On 6 May 2016, a Stinson 108 nosed over on landing at the airport.
- On 5 November 2017, a Piper PA-28 crashed while landing at the airport, injuring the pilot.
- On 8 May 2018, a Cessna 172 crashed while taking off from the airport.
- On 24 May 2018, a Luscombe 8 was damaged after being hand propped. It was stopped after being rammed by an SUV.
- On June 30, 2022, a Beechcraft Baron was damaged on landing when a tire exploded, causing the aircraft to veer off the runway. The nose gear and propeller were damaged.
- On 17 October 2026, a Cessna 172 failed to gain enough altitude after taking off, which led it to crash off of OH-32.

== See also ==
- List of airports in Ohio
