= Young Eagles =

Charitable event sponsored by the Experimental Aircraft Association

Young Eagles logo

The Young Eagles is a program created by the US Experimental Aircraft Association designed to give children between the ages of 8 and 17 an opportunity to experience flight in a general aviation airplane while educating them about aviation. The program is offered free of charge with costs covered by the volunteers. It was launched in 1992 and, by July 2024, had flown more than 2.3 million children in 90 countries, making it the most successful program of its kind in history. The presenting sponsors for it are Phillips 66 and Sporty's Pilot Shop.

== Program history ==
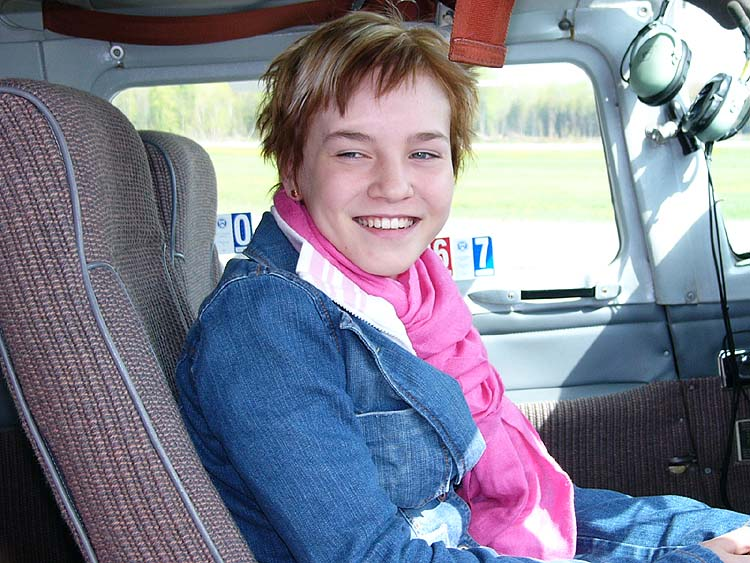
A Young Eagle participant just after completing her flight

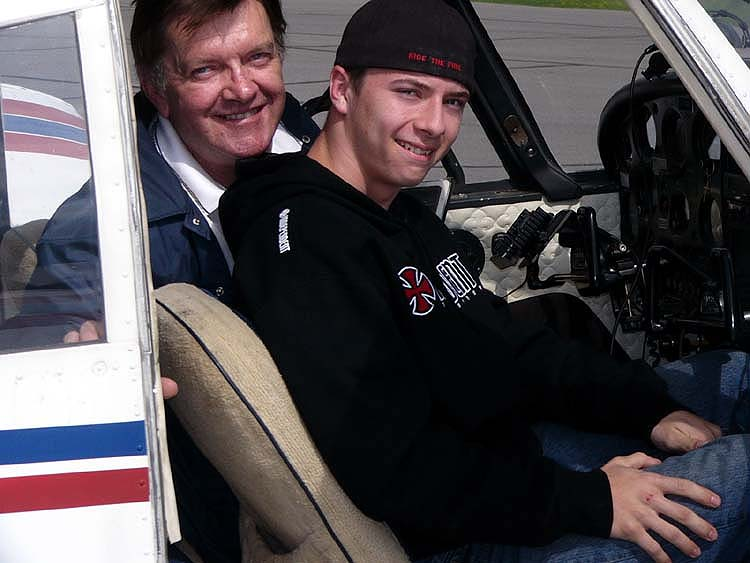
A Young Eagle participant departing on his flight with a volunteer pilot

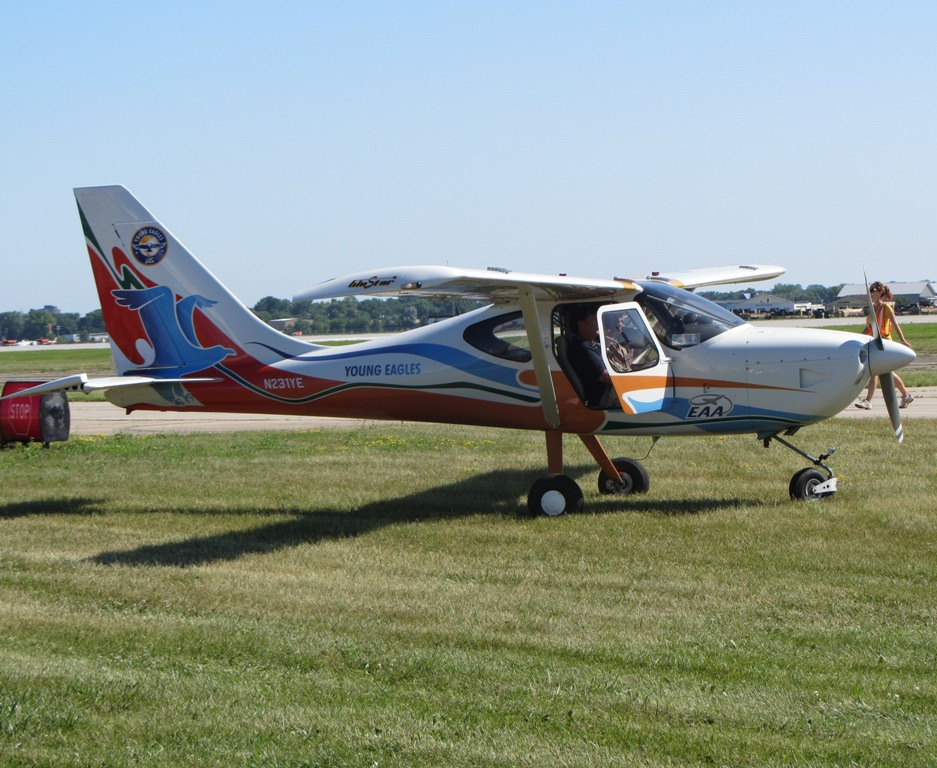
A GlaStar built for Young Eagles flights

Project Schoolflight, co-founded by EAA founder Paul Poberezny in 1955, served as the inspirational predecessor program to the Young Eagles, ending in 1978. In 1991, a survey of long-time EAA members was conducted to help determine the nascent organization's future priorities. Nearly 92 percent said EAA's primary objective should be to involve more young people in aviation. The survey also showed that a flight experience inspired respondents toward aviation. On May 13, 1992, following several months of coordination by EAA's then-President Tom Poberezny and members of the EAA Board of Directors, management, staff and volunteers, the Young Eagles Program was unveiled at a Washington, D.C. news conference.

The mission of the EAA Young Eagles Program is to provide a meaningful flight experience – free of charge – in a general aviation aircraft for young people (primarily between the ages of 8 and 17). Flights are provided by EAA members worldwide.

The initial goal of the program was to fly one million children prior to the 100th anniversary of flight celebration (Dec. 17, 2003). That goal was achieved on November 13, 2003. An ongoing annual goal of introducing 100,000 young people to the Young Eagles experience was established.

In March 2011, EAA reported the results of a study on the program that showed that program participants were 5.4 times more likely to become a pilot than those who had never participated and that 9% of those new pilots were female, an increase of 50% compared to the general population of pilots, which was 6% female. The study also indicated that the older a child is when taking their flight that it is the more likely that child will become a pilot, with two out of every 100 participants who are 17 years old continuing to complete a pilot certificate. The program is administered by the Young Eagles Office at EAA headquarters in Oshkosh, Wisconsin.

Since 1994, "International Young Eagles Day," a day set aside to encourage all EAA members and Chapters to participate is held annually on the second Saturday of June.

At AirVenture Oshkosh 2012, EAA unveiled a new program called "Eagle Flights," which will offer rides for adults.

== International Young Eagles ==
In Canada the Canadian Owners and Pilots Association participated in the Young Eagles program between 1992 and 2008. COPA members had flown more than 81,000 Young Eagles. COPA participation was ended on May 31, 2008, due to insurance concerns.

== Pilot participation ==
More than 43,000 pilots have participated in the program, donating their time and paying the full cost of providing the flights for the children in their own or rented aircraft. While some pilots have only flown a few Young Eagles there are many pilots who have flown more than three thousand children.

In September 2023, EAA volunteer Fred Stadler became the first Young Eagles pilot to fly 10,000 children as part of the program. He started giving Young Eagles flights in 2000.

== Program Chairmen ==
At the program's inception EAA decided to continuously recruit a well-known person and pilot to act as Chairman and raise the profile of the program. The program's founding chairman was Academy Award-winning film actor Cliff Robertson, who served in that capacity from 1992 to 1994. Robertson was succeeded in 1994 by retired USAF General and test pilot Chuck Yeager, the first person to fly faster than the speed of sound. Yeager stepped down as chairman in 2004 and, in March 2004, franchise film actor Harrison Ford became Chairman of the Young Eagles program. Ford has flown more than 300 Young Eagles, including the 2-millionth Young Eagle, in several types of aircraft, and finished his five-year term in 2009. In September 2009, Captain Chesley Sullenberger and First Officer Jeffrey Skiles, who became famous in the US Airways Flight 1549 Hudson River ditching on 15 January 2009, were named as the program's new co-chairmen.

In July 2013, aerobatic world champion pilot Sean D. Tucker replaced Sullenberger and Skiles as chairman. In July 2018, NFL tight end Jimmy Graham joined Tucker as the organization's co-chairman.

== Scholarships and sponsors ==
=== Rolls-Royce scholarship ===
Rolls-Royce contributed in 2010 six flight scholarships for basic flight training, and one for advanced training toward a private pilot certificate.

=== The Next Step ===
In May 2009, EAA joined with Sporty's Pilot Shop of Batavia, Ohio, to provide the Next Step to the Young Eagles Flight experience. Sporty's has made their on line Complete Flight Training Course available to any interested Young Eagle following their flight. Sporty's also provides pilot logbooks to allow Young Eagles to record their flight and any subsequent aviation experiences.

=== Gathering of Eagles ===
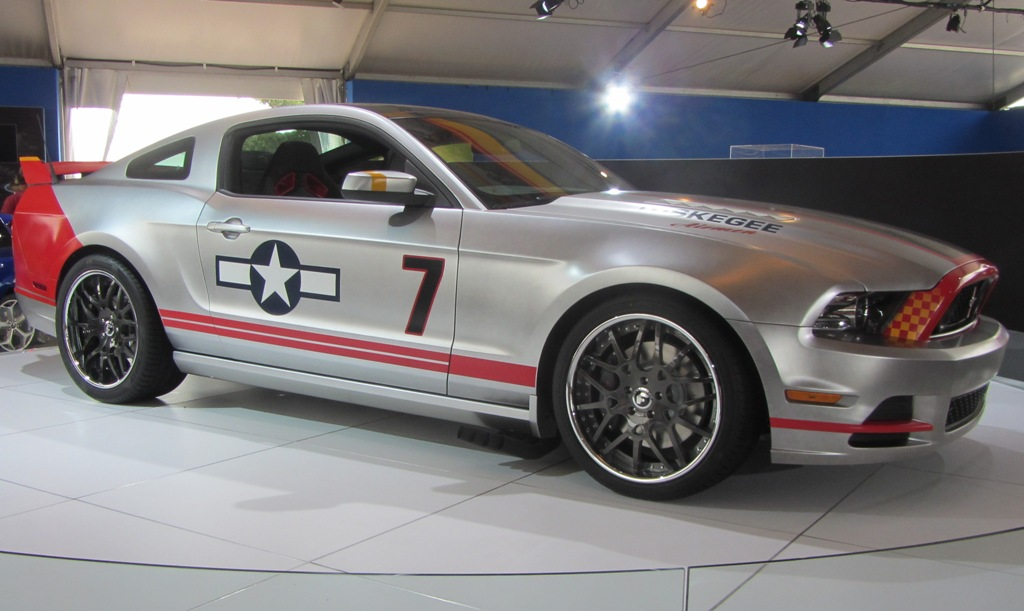
"Red Tails" Auction Mustang

The Gathering of Eagles is an annual fundraiser auction event to support the Young Eagles program. The organization hosts the event each year in the EAA AirVenture Museum during its EAA AirVenture Airshow. Among items auctioned were a SR-71 themed "Blackbird" Ford Mustang donated by Ford Motor Company, Jack Roush, and EAA member Carroll Shelby.

One-of-a-Kind Auctioned Cars

- 2006: Shelby GT350H Ford Mustang
- 2007: Unknown
- 2008: F-22 Raptor Ford Mustang "AV8R"
- 2009: P-51 "Dearborn Doll" Ford Mustang "AV-X10"
- 2010: SR-71 "Blackbird" Ford Mustang
- 2011: United States Navy Blue Angels Ford Mustang
- 2012: Tuskegee Airmen "Red Tails" Ford Mustang
- 2013: United States Air Force Thunderbirds Ford Mustang
- 2014: F-35 Lightning II Ford Mustang
- 2015: Apollo Ford Mustang
- 2016: Bob Hoover P-51 "Old Yeller" GT350 Mustang
- 2017: 2017 Ford F-150 Raptor F-22 Raptor
- 2018: 2018 Ford Eagle Squadron Mustang GT
- 2019: 2019 Ford "Old Crow" Mustang GT
- 2021: WASP inspired 2021 Ford Mustang Mach-E
- 2022: 2022 Ford Bronco

== See also ==
- Project Schoolflight (predecessor program)
