= Jeffrey Skiles =

American airline pilot (born 1959)

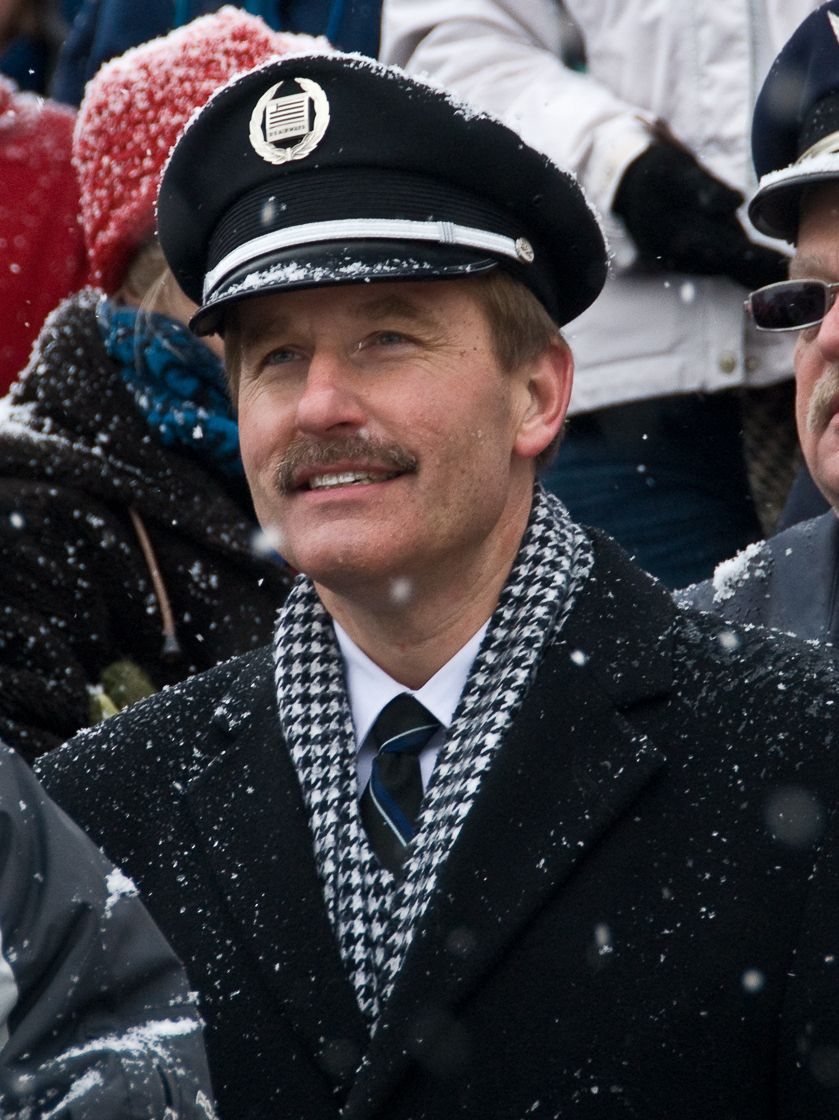
- Skiles in 2011
- Born: November 18, 1959 (age 66); Madison, Wisconsin, U.S.
- Occupations: Airline pilot; former co-chairman of the EAA Young Eagles Program
- Known for: First Officer of US Airways Flight 1549 with Chesley Sullenberger

Jeffrey Bruce Skiles (born November 18, 1959) is a retired airline pilot who most recently flew for American Airlines. On January 15, 2009, he became known globally as the first officer of US Airways Flight 1549, where he and captain Chesley "Sully" Sullenberger successfully executed a water landing of the aircraft on the Hudson River with no loss of life after the plane lost both of its engines.

== Early life and career ==
Jeff Skiles was born and raised in the greater Madison metropolitan area of Wisconsin. Both of Skiles' parents, James Skiles and Deloris McKenney, were pilots during his childhood, and he became a pilot himself when he was sixteen years old. He first worked flying cargo planes, then worked for Midstate Airlines from 1983 to 1986, and after that joined US Airways. At the time of the emergency landing he had been with US Airways for 23 years.

== US Airways Flight 1549 ==
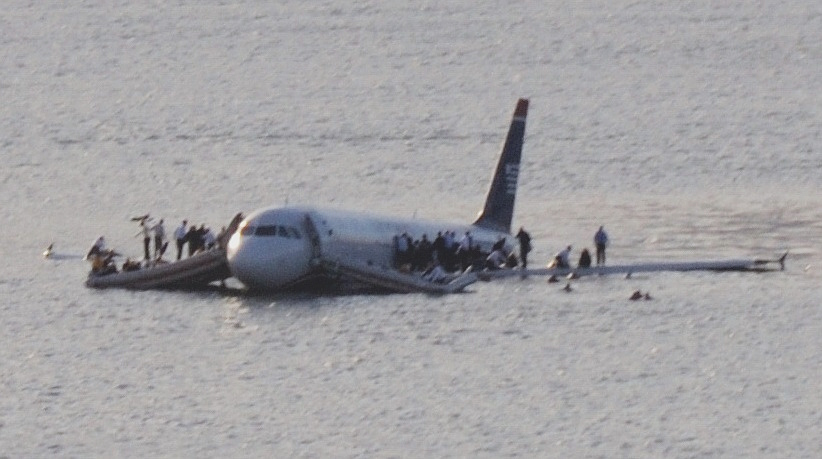
US Airways Flight 1549 afloat in the Hudson River

Skiles was flying as a First Officer on Flight 1549 due to a staff reduction at US Airways; he had usually flown as Captain prior to the staff reduction and had slightly more flight hours than Sullenberger (though Skiles was relatively new to flying the Airbus A320). Flight 1549 was their first flight together.

Atul Gawande, author of The Checklist Manifesto, asserted that the successful emergency landing relied on the cooperation of Sullenberger and Skiles. Gawande's central premise is that even highly experienced people in any field encounter rare events, and that successfully coping with the rare event requires first, the careful anticipation of future emergencies, and secondly, preparing a well thought-out list of steps to follow, in advance:

Capt. Sullenberger could be certain that Skiles was doing everything possible to re-start the engines, while he focused all of his attention and skill upon the problem of finding a place to land. The pilot and crew’s adherence to strict protocols contained in the checklist allowed them to function in a complex and dire situation.

In his book, Gawande stated that, during an emergency, there are so many tasks to complete that the first officer is working at least as hard as the captain. Sullenberger had taken on the task of finding a safe place to land, and actually landing, leaving his experienced co-pilot Skiles the task of following the checklist to try to restart the jet engines. Gawande noted that Skiles was able to complete the checklist in the less than three-minute period between the bird strike and the landing, noting this was "something investigators later testified to be "very remarkable" in the time frame he had—and something they found difficult to replicate in simulation."

PBS interviewer Charlie Rose interviewed Skiles on February 10, 2009. During that interview, Skiles predicted that Sullenberger would receive on-going attention, but his (Skiles') fifteen minutes of fame would end when he left Rose's studio. Nonetheless, he has continued to be a well-known speaker on corporate organizational reform and crisis management.

The National Transportation Safety Board (NTSB) conducted a lengthy and extensive investigation of the accident culminating in their published report dated April 4, 2010, stating: “The National Transportation Safety Board determines that the probable cause of this accident was the ingestion of large birds into each engine, which resulted in an almost total loss of thrust in both engines and the subsequent ditching on the Hudson River.”

== Post Flight 1549 life and career ==
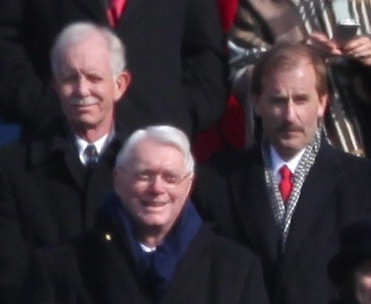
Skiles (back right) and Sully Sullenberger (back left) attending the first inauguration of Barack Obama on 20 January 2009, with U.S. senator Jim Bunning seen in front

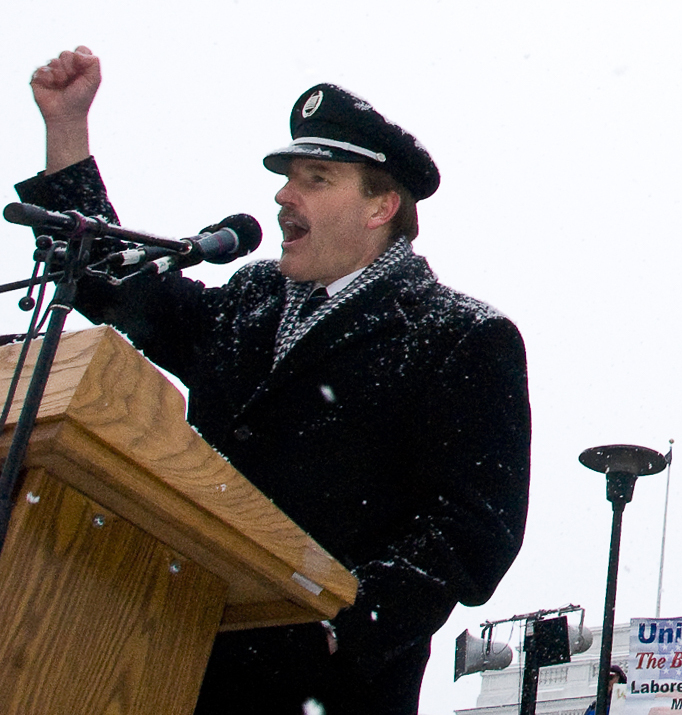
Skiles speaking at the 2011 Wisconsin protests

After a formal review of their performance, both Sullenberger and Skiles had their flight status restored.

On March 3, 2010, Sullenberger and Skiles flew together on US Airways Flight 1167 from Fort Lauderdale, Florida, to Charlotte, North Carolina, which was also Sullenberger's final flight before retirement. This was a recreation of their original flight plan, which also had a half dozen of the passengers on Flight 1549.

Skiles, a Wisconsin resident, spoke in support of trade unions in the 2011 Wisconsin protests.

Skiles went on to become the Vice President of the Coalition of Airline Pilots Associations (CAPA), which represents the interests of 28,000 airline pilots in safety and security issues. In this role he was instrumental in the creation of the First Officer Qualification rule, which significantly increased the requirements for training and experience of First Officers on the flight deck of US registered airliners. Skiles joined with the Families of Continental Flight 3407 and the National Air Disaster Alliance to mold the creation of and ensure passage of the Airline Safety Act of 2010, which significantly improved safety in the US airline industry. Since its passage, the only fatalities in US airline accidents occurred on April 17, 2018, when a passenger died onboard Southwest Airlines Flight 1380, October 17, 2019 when a passenger died due to injuries sustained on PenAir Flight 3296 after a runway excursion, and January 25, 2025, when 67 people died in the 2025 Potomac River mid-air collision.

In September 2009, Skiles and Sullenberger became the honorary Co-Chairmen of the Experimental Aircraft Association (EAA)'s Young Eagles program, which utilizes EAA's nationwide network of local chapters to offer free airplane rides to young people and expose them to general aviation and careers in aviation. EAA volunteers have performed over 2.2 million flights since its inception, making it the most successful program of its kind in history.

As of 2021, Skiles was working for American Airlines, piloting Boeing 787 Dreamliners. He became a captain in 2022. Skiles retired on November 17, 2024, after captaining his final flight AA87 from London Heathrow to Chicago O'Hare.

=== Honors ===
On January 16, 2009, the United States Senate passed a resolution recognizing and honoring Sullenberger, Skiles, the cabin crew, the passengers, and the first responders involved in Flight 1549's emergency landing; and during the Super Bowl XLIII pre-game ceremony on February 1, 2009, Sullenberger, Skiles, and Flight 1549's cabin crew—Doreen Welsh, Sheila Dail, and Donna Dent—were honored with a standing ovation. Skiles and the entire crew of Flight 1549 also received a Masters Medal by the Guild of Air Pilots and Air Navigators and a Key to the City of New York in 2009, as well as the Smithsonian National Air and Space Museum Trophy for Current Achievement in 2010. Through their involvement with the Young Eagles and various aviation safety advocacy efforts, Skiles and Sullenberger received the 2015 EAA Freedom of Flight Award.

== Publications and media ==
Skiles is a writer and, since 2011, has published over 100 articles on safety and general interest aviation topics in nationally distributed magazines such as Sport Aviation, Flying, Air & Space, PilotMag, Midwest Flyer, Vintage Airplane, and the Physicians Executive Journal.

In the 2016 drama film Sully, directed by Clint Eastwood, Skiles is portrayed by Aaron Eckhart, with Sullenberger portrayed by Tom Hanks.
