= Project Schoolflight =

Project Schoolflight was a youth outreach program of the Experimental Aircraft Association (EAA) which was jointly co-founded in 1955 by EAA founder Paul Poberezny and Robert D. Blacker, the director of the Aviation Industrial Arts program at St. Rita of Cascia High School in Chicago, Illinois and President of EAA Chapter 15.

Poberezny had written series of three articles entitled "Build this plane (Baby Ace) for $800, Including Engine" which ran in consecutive 1955 monthly issues of Mechanix Illustrated magazines and Blacker decided to use the plans for the first Schoolflight homebuilt aircraft project. Blacker contacted Poberezny and he supplied a copy of the Baby Ace plans for the program at no charge. Poberezny thought that Blacker's program could provide him with a start to fulfilling one of his lifetime dreams - to have an "airplane building factory" for homebuilt aircraft. It was from these discussions that both men agreed to co-found Project Schoolflight together.

The Project Schoolflight program was initially overseen by both men but it grew so quickly that it became administered by the EAA's Air Museum Foundation instead. The project dissolved around 1978, and would eventually help inspire the founding of the very successful EAA Young Eagles program, established in 1992.

== History ==
In 1952, prior to founding the EAA, Paul Poberezny purchased all of the inventory and the legal rights of the then defunct Ace Aircraft Manufacturing Company, including all rights and plans to the Baby Ace sport aircraft, all of which had been left abandoned in an airport hangar in Madison, Wisconsin.

Early in 1955, Poberezny built a Baby Ace on which he painted to advertise Mechanix Illustrated, which had agreed to publish his project story, to include blueprints, of his Baby Ace build over three consecutive monthly issues. Robert D. Blacker, the aeronautical instructor for St. Rita of Cascia High School and EAA Chapter 15 President, read Poberenzy's story in MI and thought that building a Baby Ace would be an ideal class project. Blacker contacted Poberenzy, who provided Baby Ace plans at no cost and together they founded Project Schoolflight.

In September of that year, Blacker and his students began building their first Baby Ace for Project Schoolflight, which would be named the Spirit of Cascia, after Cascia, St. Rita's hometown.

Participating in the project inspired the students to form Chapter #39, the first Junior EAA Chapter, including electing student officers. Chapter 39 students also volunteered at the EAA Fly-Ins from 1957 until 1960 where they helped run the competitive flying events.

In 1957, the Spirit of Cascia was completed. The second airplane was an EAA Biplane, completed in 1960, five years after the start of the program.

At the 1957 EAA Fly-in in Milwaukee, Wisconsin, the "Spirit of Cascia" won an EAA award for "Outstanding Achievement" which was presented by Ray Stits. At the 1958 Fly-in, Blacker was awarded the Mechanix Illustrated Trophy for "Outstanding Achievements in Home-Built Aircraft" for his work in starting Project Schoolflight. In 1961, the Spirit of Cascia was sold to an airplane enthusiast from Pine Bluff, Arkansas. As of 2018 it resides in storage at the Greater Saint Louis Air & Space Museum.

The EAA Biplane completed made its first flight at the 1961 EAA Fly-in in Rockford, Illinois and was put on permanent display in the EAA Aviation Museum, then located in Franklin, Wisconsin.

In 1957, Blacker made available his high school shop for Chicago EAA Chapter #15 to hold their monthly meetings there to help expand awareness of the project and gain wider involvement. Blacker soon became President of EAA Chapter 15 while continuing to serve as the adult sponsor and advisor to Junior Chapter #39.

In 1959, Blacker and Poberezny both appeared on a local TV show on WMVS-TV in Milwaukee. Blacker explained how Project Schoolflight worked, while Poberezny explained EAA activities.

Project Schoolflight quickly spread across the US, with thousands of students involved. By 1961 almost 400 airplanes were being built at more than 300 schools. In addition ten American prisons used Project Schoolflight as an inmate rehabilitation program.

In 1962, due to the project's success, the EAA formalized the establishment of junior EAA chapters, with members to be under 19 years of age, with an adult advisor and sponsored by a regular EAA Chapter.

In 1974, EAA member Sam Burgess flew a four month tour covering 48 states. This outreach program, flown in an Acro Sport I biplane, was intended to encourage schools to either continue in the program or to create their own Project Schoolflight programs by building an Acro Sport, a direct descendant design of the EAA Biplane. Burgess timed his tour so that his final stop would be Oshkosh, Wisconsin, to coincide with the start of the 1974 fly-in there.

One of the EAA Museum's centerpiece attractions is the 1903 Wright Flyer replica built by EAA and the Project Schoolflight students at Blackhawk Technical Institute in Janesville, Wisconsin, in 1978.

In the summer of 1961, Bob Blacker left St. Rita's High School to work for the Federal Aviation Administration (FAA) in Washington, DC. Blacker incorporated Project Schoolflight into the U.S. Department of Transportation/FAA guidelines as an approved educational program.

Project Schoolflight started winding down soon after the delivery of the Wright Flyer replica to the EAA Museum in 1978. However, the project served as a forerunner for EAA's follow-on Young Eagles program.

=== Young Eagles program ===
In the 2001 Annual Report to EAA Members, Tom Poberezny, Paul's son and then CEO of EAA, remarked: "As we focus on Sport Pilot and Light Sport Aircraft, we will continue to address our core programs built around homebuilder aircraft education ... the important part of the future is educational outreach programs. They started in 1956 at St. Rita High School with [Project Schoolflight...by Robert Blacker] and his students. That was a showcase initiative that touched a few kids deeply, but we wanted to do more".

Because of the EAA's policies on youth education, many prominent educators visited EAA Headquarters to study the Schoolflight program. In 1992, Tom Poberezny founded the EAA's Young Eagles program, giving children their first flight in a light aircraft. The Young Eagles program would serve to transition the youths of EAA from homebuilding planes to introducing them to flying and encouraging them to become pilots.
