= EAA Biplane =

American aircraft

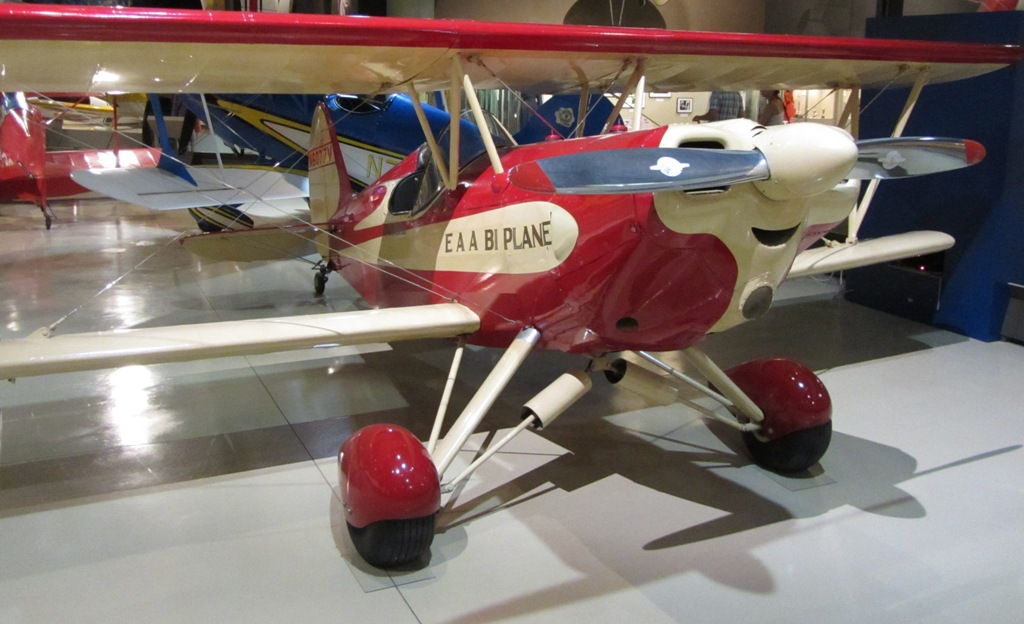
- EAA Biplane on display at the EAA Museum

General information
- Type: Homebuilt
- Manufacturer: Robert D. Blacker
- Designer: Allison Team & Robert Blacker

History
- First flight: 10 June 1960

The EAA Biplane is a recreational aircraft that was designed by the Experimental Aircraft Association in the United States and marketed as plans for home-built aircraft.

== Design and development ==
A preliminary design was produced for the EAA by a team of Allison engineers led by EAA member Jim D. Stewart in 1955. This team took the Gere Sport of the 1930s as their starting point and eventually developed a completely new design, which also incorporated several later design changes made by Robert D. Blacker, the prototype's builder and one of its test pilots.

Blacker's design changes included adding a +2 degree of dihedral to the upper wing, redesign of the horizontal stabilizer, installation of a diagonal brace at Stations 2 and 3, a change to the fuselage truss assembly, strengthening of the control column support, and a ball-bearing arrangement.

The design is a single-seat biplane of conventional configuration, with staggered, single-bay equal-span wings braced with N-struts. The undercarriage is of fixed tailwheel type. The fuselage is fabric-covered welded steel tube, and the wings fabric-covered wood.

This prototype EAA Biplane was built by Blacker (President of EAA Chapter 15 at the time) and his students at St. Rita of Cascia High School in Chicago, Illinois, as the second airplane completed as part of EAA's Project Schoolflight. The EAA Biplane construction began in September 1957, with a first flight in June, 1960. During the construction of the prototype, Blacker wrote several "EAA Biplane Progress Reports" published in EAA's Sport Aviation magazine. Blacker put the prototype's incomplete fuselage as on display at EAA's 1958 fly-in. The prototype EAA Biplane work, along with the other facets of Project Schoolflight, resulted in the award of the Mechanix Illustrated trophy for "Outstanding Achievement in Home-Built Aircraft". The completed prototype EAA Biplane was first publicly shown at the 1961 Rockford, Illinois Fly-In.

== Operational history ==
Plans for the biplane remained available until 1972, with 7,000 sets sold.

== Aircraft on display ==
- EAA Aviation Museum, Oshkosh, Wisconsin - prototype.
- Aviation Museum of New Hampshire, Londonderry, New Hampshire - regis. N317JJ

== Specifications (typical) ==
Data from Jane's All The World's Aircraft 1965–66.

General characteristics

- Crew: 1
- Length: 17 ft 0 in (5.18 m)
- Wingspan: 20 ft 0 in (6.10 m)
- Height: 6 ft 0 in (1.83 m)
- Wing area: 108 sq ft (10.0 m^{2})
- Empty weight: 710 lb (322 kg)
- Gross weight: 1,150 lb (522 kg)
- Fuel capacity: 18 US gal (15 imp gal; 68 L)
- Powerplant: 1 × Continental C85 air-cooled flat-four engine, 85 hp (63 kW)

Performance

- Maximum speed: 125 mph (201 km/h, 109 kn) at sea level
- Cruise speed: 110 mph (180 km/h, 96 kn) (econ. cruise)
- Stall speed: 50 mph (80 km/h, 43 kn)
- Range: 350 mi (560 km, 300 nmi)
- Service ceiling: 11,500 ft (3,500 m)
- Rate of climb: 1,000 ft/min (5.1 m/s)
