= Jack J. Pelton =

American aviation executive

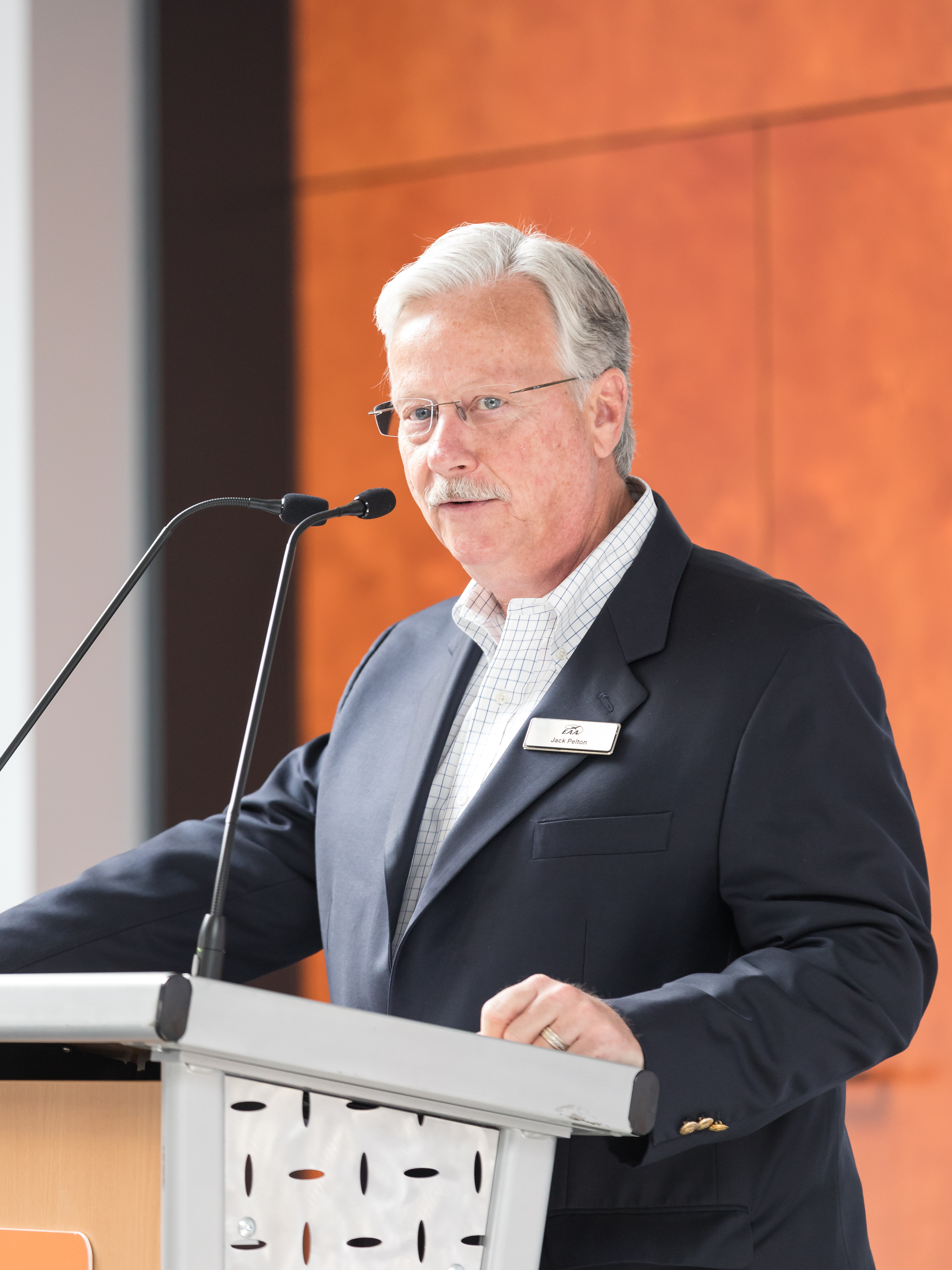
- Pelton in 2018
- Born: John Pelton
- Occupation: Aviation Chief Executive Officer
- Employer: Experimental Aircraft Association
- Spouse: Rose Pelton

Jack J. Pelton is an American aviation businessman who is chairman of the Experimental Aircraft Association (EAA) since 2012 and its CEO since 2015. He was CEO of Cessna Aircraft Company from 2004 to 2011, a subsidiary of Textron Inc and now a brand of Textron Aviation. Before becoming Cessna's CEO, Pelton was its Senior Vice President of Product Engineering since 2000 and prior to that, Senior Vice President of Engineering and Programs at Fairchild Dornier. Previous to Fairchild, he worked at McDonnell Douglas for over two decades.

Pelton grew up in an aviation family in Riverside, California. His father flew in the U.S. Army Air Forces during World War II and was an early member in the local EAA chapter in Riverside. His mother was also a pilot.

Soon after Pelton was named CEO of Cessna, it was revealed in 2004 that his resume included references to education received from Hamilton University, which 60 Minutes discovered was a diploma mill. Neither his undergraduate or graduate degrees in Aerospace Engineering were earned from an accredited school. Temporarily embarrassed by the revelation, Textron released a statement proclaiming that Pelton was chosen for his 30-year-long career in leadership and not for his faked diplomas.

Pelton testified in favor of a property tax increase to build an aviation training facility that would benefit Cessna at an August 9, 2006 Sedgwick County Commission meeting. At a December 12, 2006 meeting of the Wichita City Council, Cessna applied for industrial revenue bonds that include an exemption from paying property tax on property purchased with IRB proceeds.

In March 2008, Kansas Governor Kathleen Sebelius appointed Pelton to lead the Kansas Energy and Environmental Policy Advisory Group.

On May 2, 2011, Textron announced that Pelton retired from Cessna as its chairman, president and CEO "effective immediately". The aviation news media noted Pelton's hasty retirement. AvWeb editor-in-chief Russ Niles questioned "who retires 'effective immediately' at age 52 on a Monday morning when the boss is in town?" and speculated that it was related to a possible demand from Textron for cuts to Cessna after a first-quarter 2011 loss of US $38 million.

On October 22, 2012, Pelton became Chairman of the Board of EAA and its annual convention, AirVenture Oshkosh. This marked the first time in the EAA's history that a Chairman was elected from outside the organization's founding Poberezny family (Paul and Tom Poberezny).

By the end of 2012, Pelton was also managing director of Aviation Alliance, a partnership of ten individuals and companies that intends to sell remanufacturered turboprop-powered Cessna 421s under the name Aviation Alliance Excalibur.

On November 9, 2015, Pelton was named CEO of the Experimental Aircraft Association. The CEO position at EAA had been vacant since November 2012.

He has been on past boards such as the Smithsonian National Air and Space Museum, the National Business Aircraft Association (NBAA), and the General Aviation Manufacturers Association (GAMA), acting as its chairman in 2006. Pelton was given the 2008 EAA Freedom of Flight Award and is an honoree of the Living Legends of Aviation. In 2017, he received the National Aeronautic Association (NAA)’s Distinguished Statesman of Aviation Award and was inducted into the Kansas Aviation Hall of Fame.
