= Experimental Aircraft Association =

Aviation organization in Oshkosh, United States

- Abbreviation: EAA
- Formation: 1953; 73 years ago in Hales Corners, Wisconsin, U.S.
- Founder: Paul Poberezny
- Type: Nonprofit organization
- Tax ID no.: 39-0917537
- Legal status: 501(c)(3)
- Headquarters: Oshkosh, Wisconsin, U.S.
- Region served: Worldwide
- Members: 300,000+ (2024)
- Key people: Jack Pelton (CEO and chairman); Tom Poberezny (chairman emeritus until his death in 2022); Sean Tucker & Jimmy Graham (Young Eagles co-chairmen)
- Subsidiaries: EAA IMC LLC, EAA STC LLC, EAA Aviation Foundation Inc (501(c)(3)
- Revenue: $39,868,940 (2018)
- Expenses: $37,997,229 (2018)
- Employees: 872 (2017)
- Volunteers: 5,500 (2017)
- Website: www.eaa.org

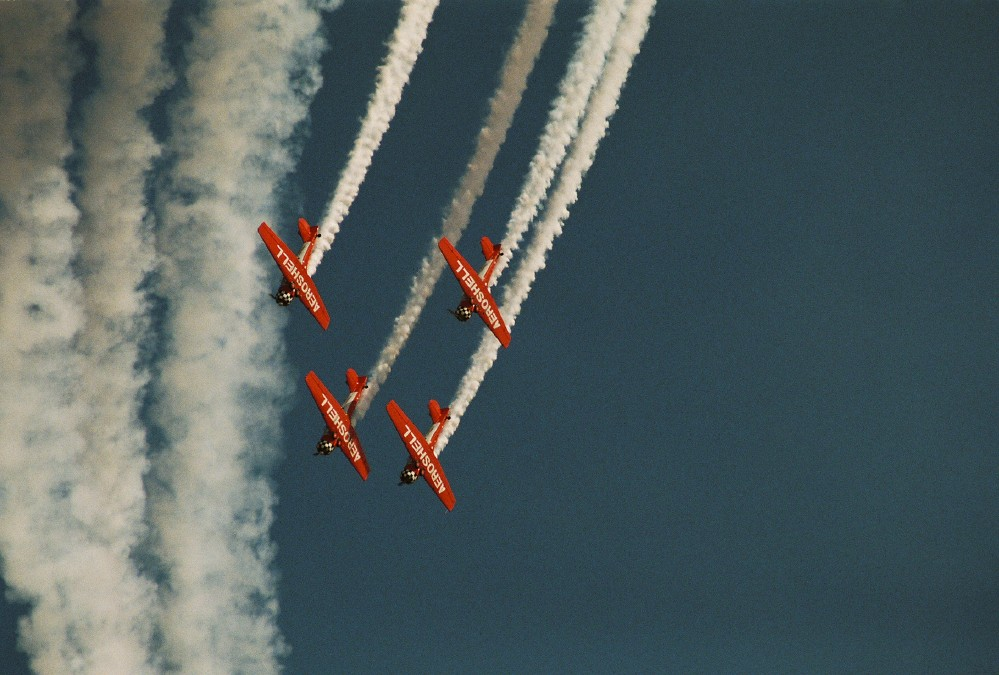
EAA AirVenture 2004

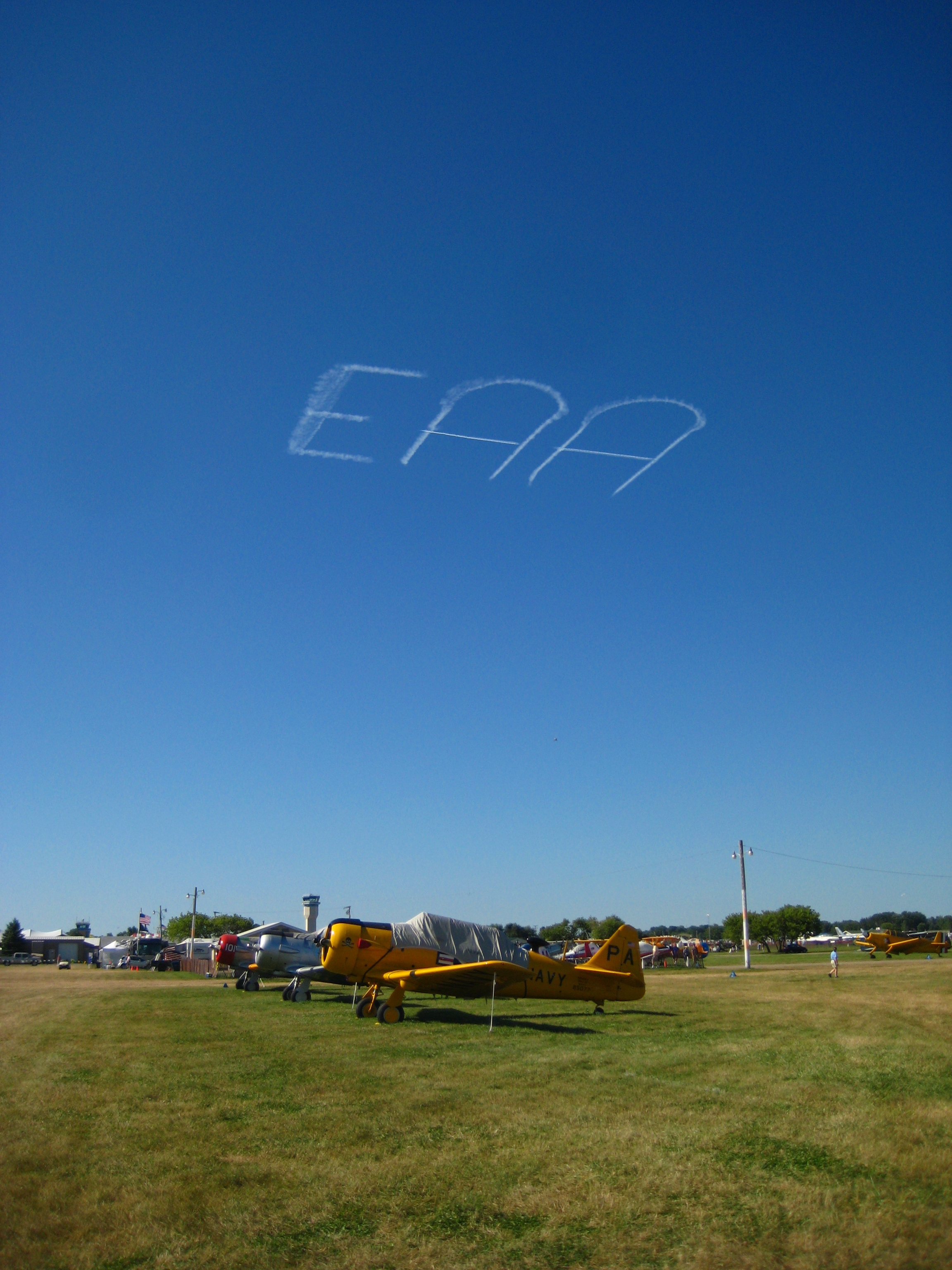
Skywriting over Oshkosh, WI during AirVenture 2008

The Experimental Aircraft Association (EAA) is an international organization of aviation enthusiasts based in Oshkosh, Wisconsin, United States. Since its inception, it has grown internationally with over 300,000 members and nearly 1,000 chapters worldwide. It hosts the largest aviation gathering of its kind in the world, EAA AirVenture Oshkosh.

== History ==
The EAA was founded in 1953 by aviator Paul Poberezny along with other aviation enthusiasts. The organization began as more or less a flying club. Poberezny explains the nature of the organization's name, "Because the planes we flew were modified or built from scratch, they were required to display an EXPERIMENTAL placard where it could be seen on the door or cockpit, so it was quite natural that we call ourselves the "Experimental Aircraft Association". The EAA was incorporated in Wisconsin on 22 March 1955. Homebuilding is still a large part of EAA, but the organization has grown over the years to include almost every aspect of aviation and aeronautics.

EAA's first location was in the basement of Poberezny's Hales Corners, Wisconsin home. In the early 1960s, the association's first headquarters was built in the Milwaukee suburb of Franklin. That was the headquarters for the organization until 1983, when EAA combined its headquarters and fly-in site in Oshkosh, Wisconsin. The EAA Aviation Center also includes the EAA Aviation Museum, with more than 200 aircraft, approximately 130 of which are on display at any given time.

In 1953, the Experimental Aircraft Association released a two-page newsletter named The Experimenter. The newsletter was written and published by founding members Paul and Audrey Poberezny along with other volunteers. The newsletter transitioned to a magazine format and was renamed Sport Aviation and became a membership benefit. The Experimenter name lives on, however, in an online magazine specifically for amateur-built and light plane enthusiasts that debuted in 2012. It was folded into the monthly Sport Aviation print magazine in 2015.

In 2010, the United States' national aeromodeling organization, the Academy of Model Aeronautics, was involved in negotiations with the EAA homebuilt aviation organization, that resulted in a "memorandum of understanding" that is intended to encourage collaboration between the two American-based sport aviation organizations, in developing, in the words of the AMA's then-President Dave Mathewson, "the creation of new concepts that will promote aviation, both full-scale and modeling, as a perfect family recreational and educational activity". This link with the AMA has further strengthened in the face of unprecedented FAA concern of aeromodeling as a form of UAS activity they now have a reason to regulate, and are now tasked with regulating - the EAA, in late November 2019, stated that "We see model aviation as an important pathway to manned flight," adding that "Our goal in this risk assessment process is to represent the safety concerns of our members while allowing the highest degree of freedom for legacy model aircraft, which have flown alongside us in the airspace for decades."

In 2015, the EAA and EAA Young Eagles were inducted into the International Air & Space Hall of Fame at the San Diego Air & Space Museum.

== Museum and airport ==
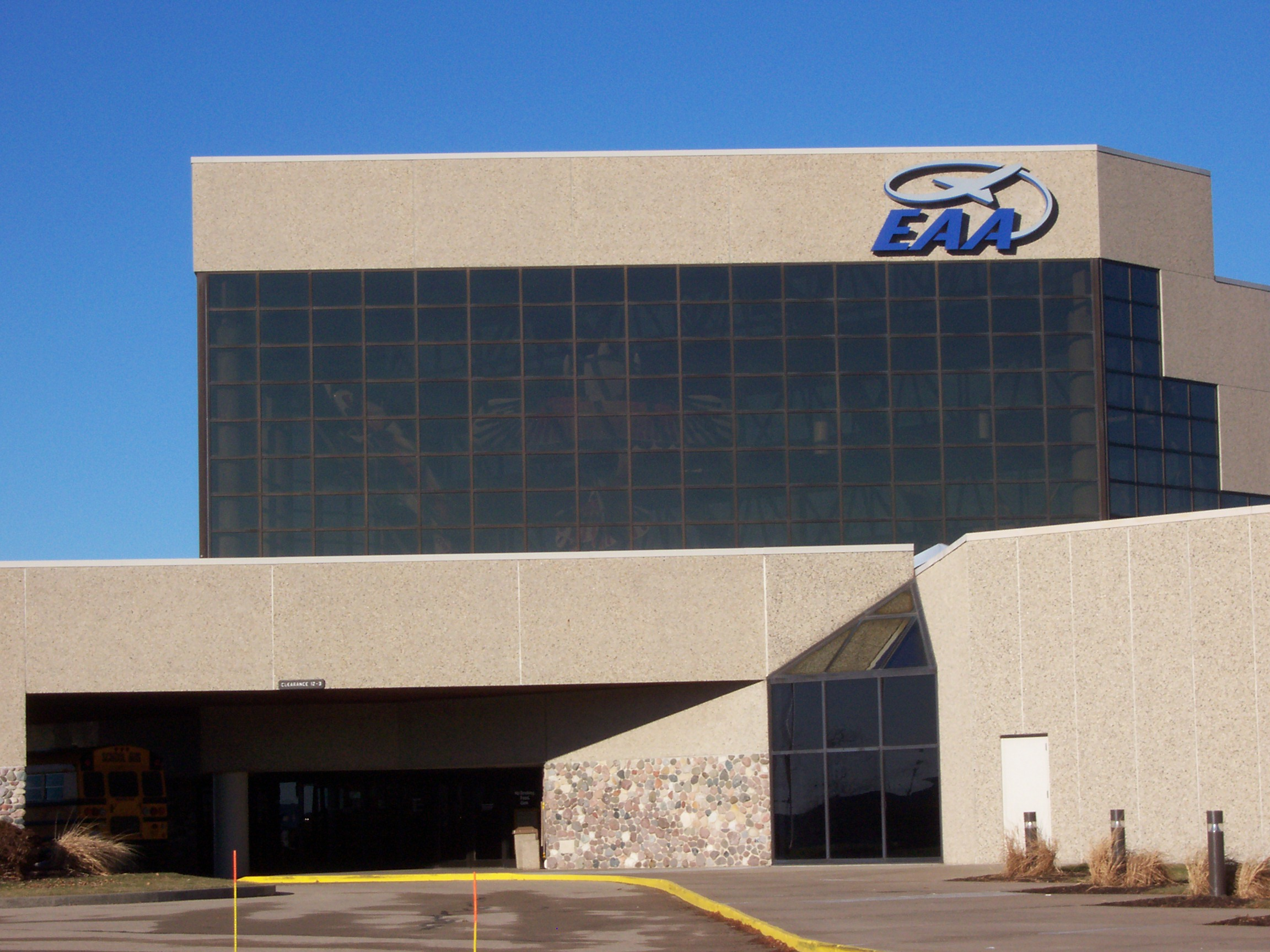
EAA Aviation Museum

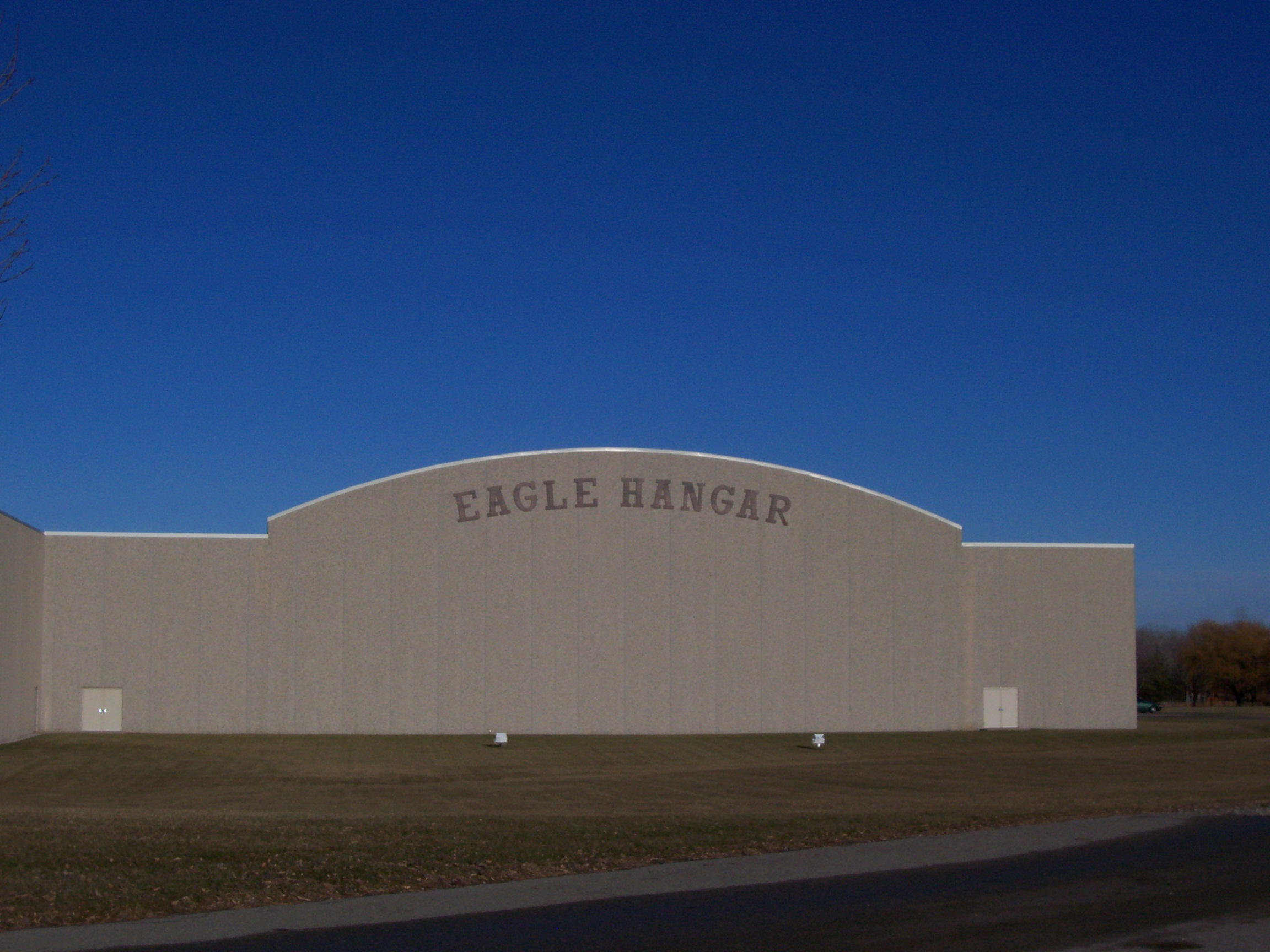
Eagle Hangar at the EAA Aviation Museum

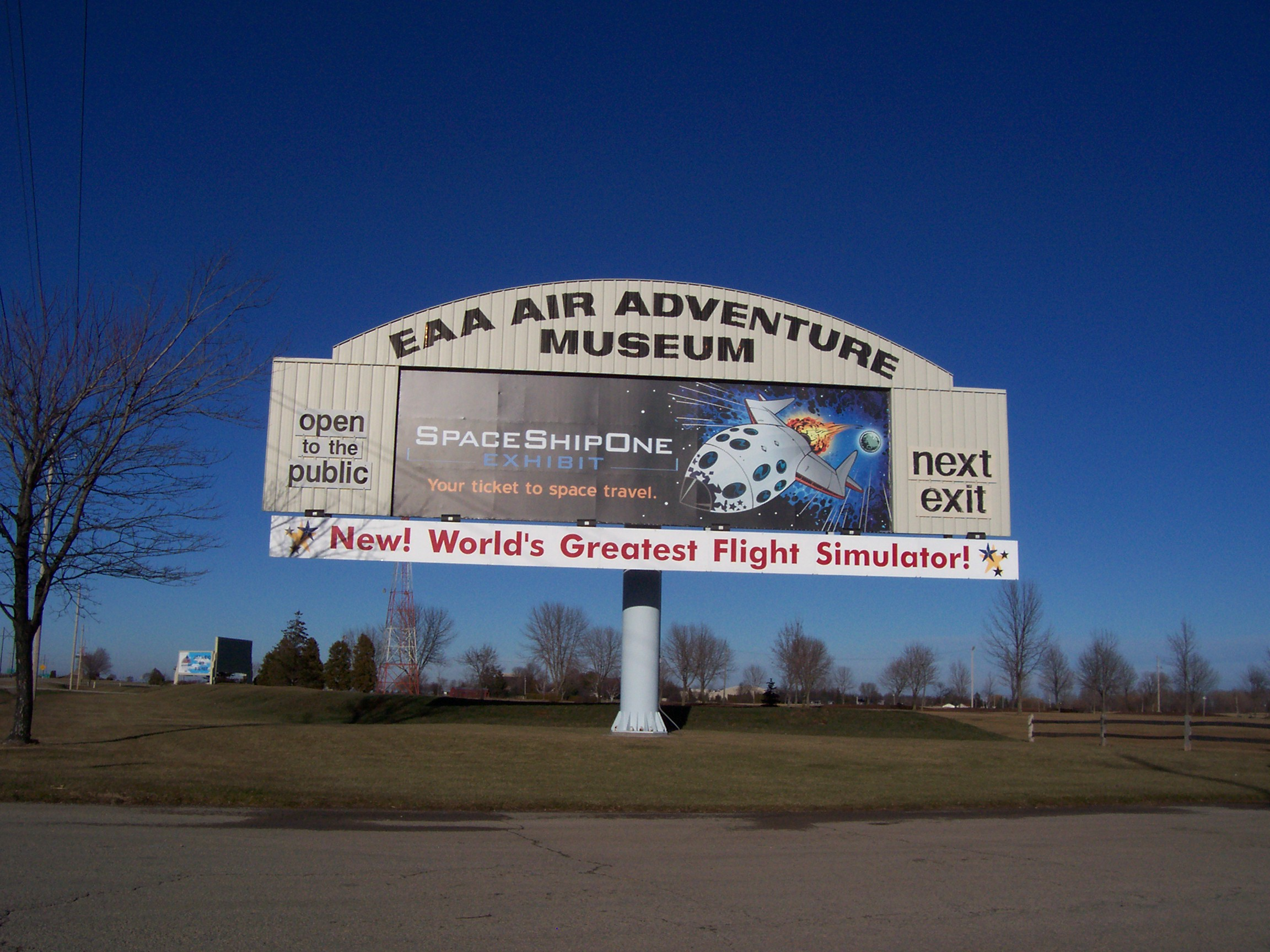
EAA Air Adventure Museum sign on Interstate 41

The EAA Aviation Museum is an extensive collection of aircraft and aviation displays. It opened in 1983 and located adjacent to EAA's headquarters in Oshkosh. The Museum is home to EAA's collection of more than 200 aircraft, of which more than 90 are on display inside the museum at any time.

The adjacent Pioneer Airport opened in 1984. It is a re-creation of a 1930s aerodrome, with a turf runway and more than 40 additional airplanes on display. Visitors are offered flights in vintage aircraft. It operates daily from Memorial Day to Labor Day, and on weekends in May and through mid October.

== Programs and activities ==
=== Technical Counselor program ===
To help ensure that all amateur-built aircraft are well-constructed, safe aircraft, the EAA organizes a group of volunteers, known as Technical Counselors, who will visit the construction project to identify any areas of concern. Technical Counselors are EAA members who volunteer their time and who have met at least one of the following criteria:

- Have built an experimental category aircraft
- Have restored an antique/classic aircraft
- Hold an A&P, IA, DAR, DER or Aerospace Engineer rating in the United States, an equivalent international rating or have the qualifications for those ratings.

There is no charge for this on-site review. The program is strictly voluntary. The recommendations of the Technical Counselor are advisory only. The EAA recommends a minimum of three Technical Counselor visits over the course of construction.

=== Flight Advisor program ===
The Flight Advisor Program is designed to increase homebuilt aircraft safety by developing a corps of volunteers who have demonstrated expertise in specific areas of flying and making them available to EAA members who may be preparing to fly an unfamiliar aircraft. A Flight Advisor helps the pilot conduct a self-evaluation as well as evaluate the flying characteristics of the aircraft. Pilots use that evaluation to decide whether they are capable of flying that airplane. If not capable, the Flight Advisor explains where and how the pilot can get the proper instruction, or alternatively find someone to make the initial flights.

Under the EAA Flight Advisor Program, the Advisor does not fly or decide whether or not the pilot is capable of flying the airplane to be tested. The Advisor provides the pilot with the pros and cons as they relate to this specific combination of pilot and airplane. The pilot makes the final decision on how to proceed with the flight testing program.

=== EAA AirVenture Oshkosh ===
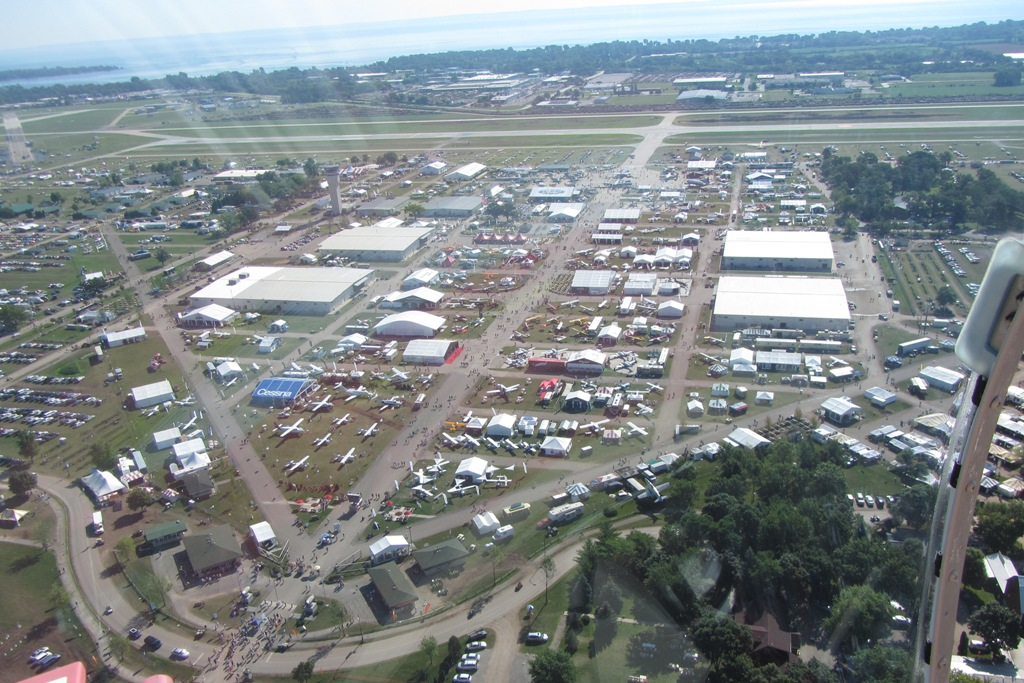
Wittman Field during the EAA AirVenture Oshkosh airshow 2011

Each summer EAA presents the largest annual general aviation event in the world, EAA AirVenture Oshkosh, also commonly known as the "Oshkosh Airshow". During the event, the city's airport, Wittman Regional Airport, named after Steve Wittman, is the busiest airport in the world (in terms of traffic movements). The week-long event annually attracts around 10,000-12,000 planes and a total attendance of more than 500,000. The event also attracts more than 800 exhibitors, hosts nearly 1,000 forums, seminars and workshops, and welcomes more than 700 journalists each year.

The annual fly-in was first held in 1953 at what is now Timmerman Field in Milwaukee. In 1959, the growing event moved to the Rockford, Illinois airport. Attendance at the fly-in continued to grow until the Rockford airport (now Chicago Rockford International Airport) was too small to accommodate the crowds, and so it was moved to Oshkosh in 1970. A study conducted in 2008 by the University of Wisconsin–Oshkosh determined that the 500,000 annual fly-in attendance generates $110 million of tourist income for the three counties surrounding the airport. In 2017, that economic impact was estimated at over $170 million and a total attendance of nearly 600,000 people.

=== Young Eagles ===
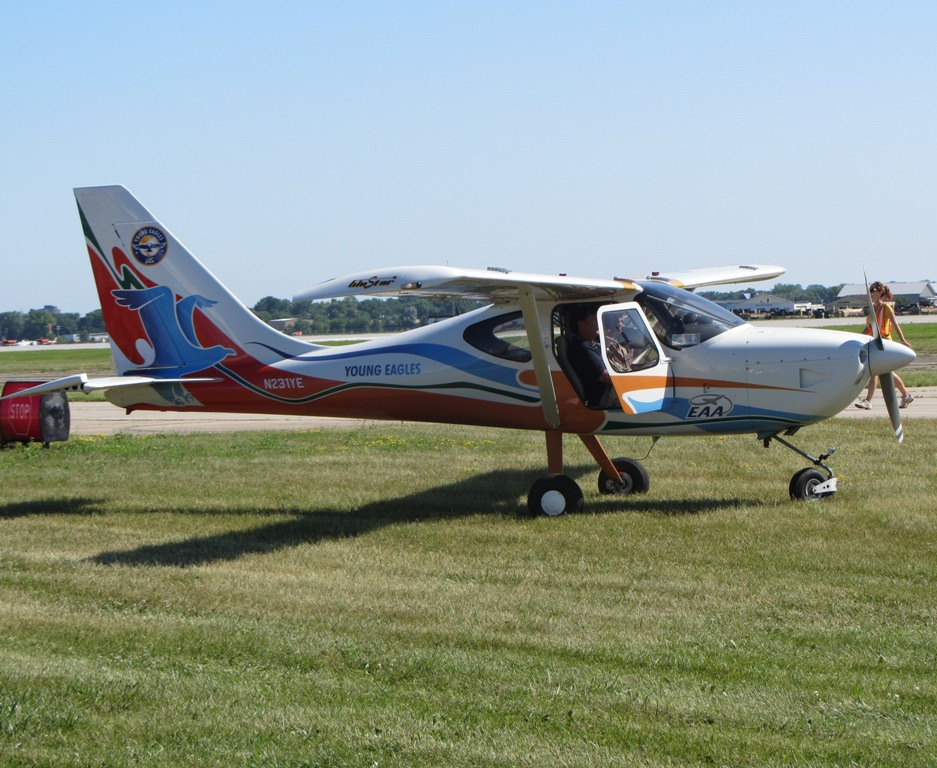
A GlaStar built for Young Eagles flights

The EAA also sponsors the Young Eagles program, which was started in 1992 by Tom Poberezny and others, with the aim of giving one million children an airplane ride by 17 December 2003, the Centennial of Flight (see Wright brothers and Wright Flyer). The program reached that goal, and has continued, with more than 2 million young people flown as of July 2016 and more introduced to and educated around the benefits of general aviation.

The Young Eagles program has been overseen by a series of nationally famous chairmen:

- Cliff Robertson - founding chairman, film and stage actor (1992–1994)
- Chuck Yeager - USAF General and first man to fly faster than the speed of sound (1994–2004)
- Harrison Ford - film and stage actor (2004–2009)
- Chesley Sullenberger and Jeffrey B. Skiles - pilots of US Airways Flight 1549 (2009–2013)
- Sean D. Tucker - aerobatic pilot (2013–present)
- Jimmy Graham - NFL tight end (2018–present)

=== Sun 'N Fun Airshow ===
The other major yearly airshow attended by EAA members and staff is Sun 'n Fun, held every April in Lakeland, Florida. Sun 'n Fun has been an independent organization from the EAA since its first show in 1975, although the event has always involved significant EAA participation. The two organizations signed an agreement in January 1989 recognizing their independence. On 30 March 2005 Sun 'n Fun issued a press release affirming the independence of the two organizations but assuring the aviation public that they would continue to work together. As such Sun 'n Fun remains a show with participation from EAA chapters and a presence from the national EAA staff, but it is not an EAA event.

== Organizational structure ==
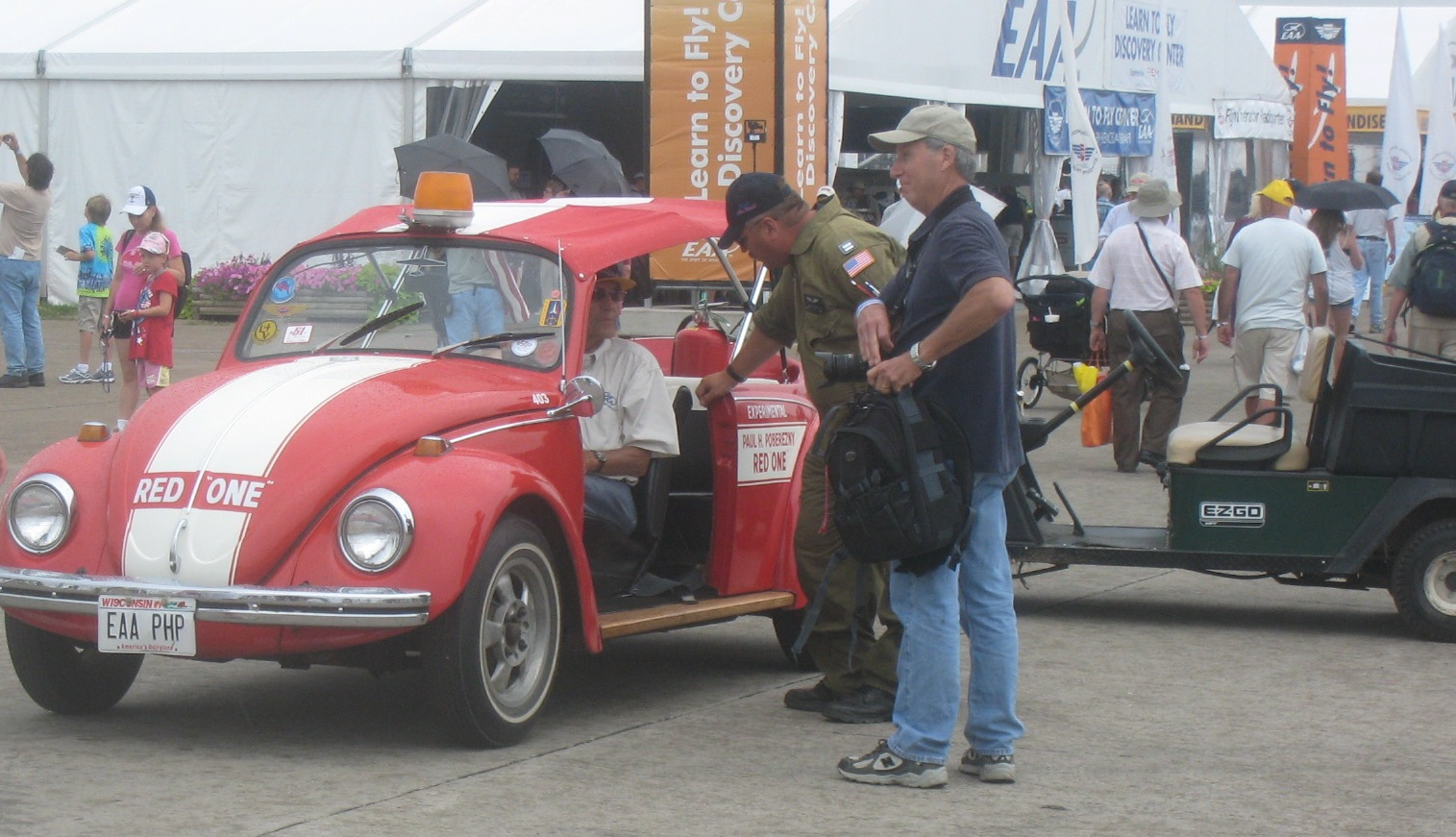
Founder Paul Poberezny driving "Red One" at AirVenture 2010

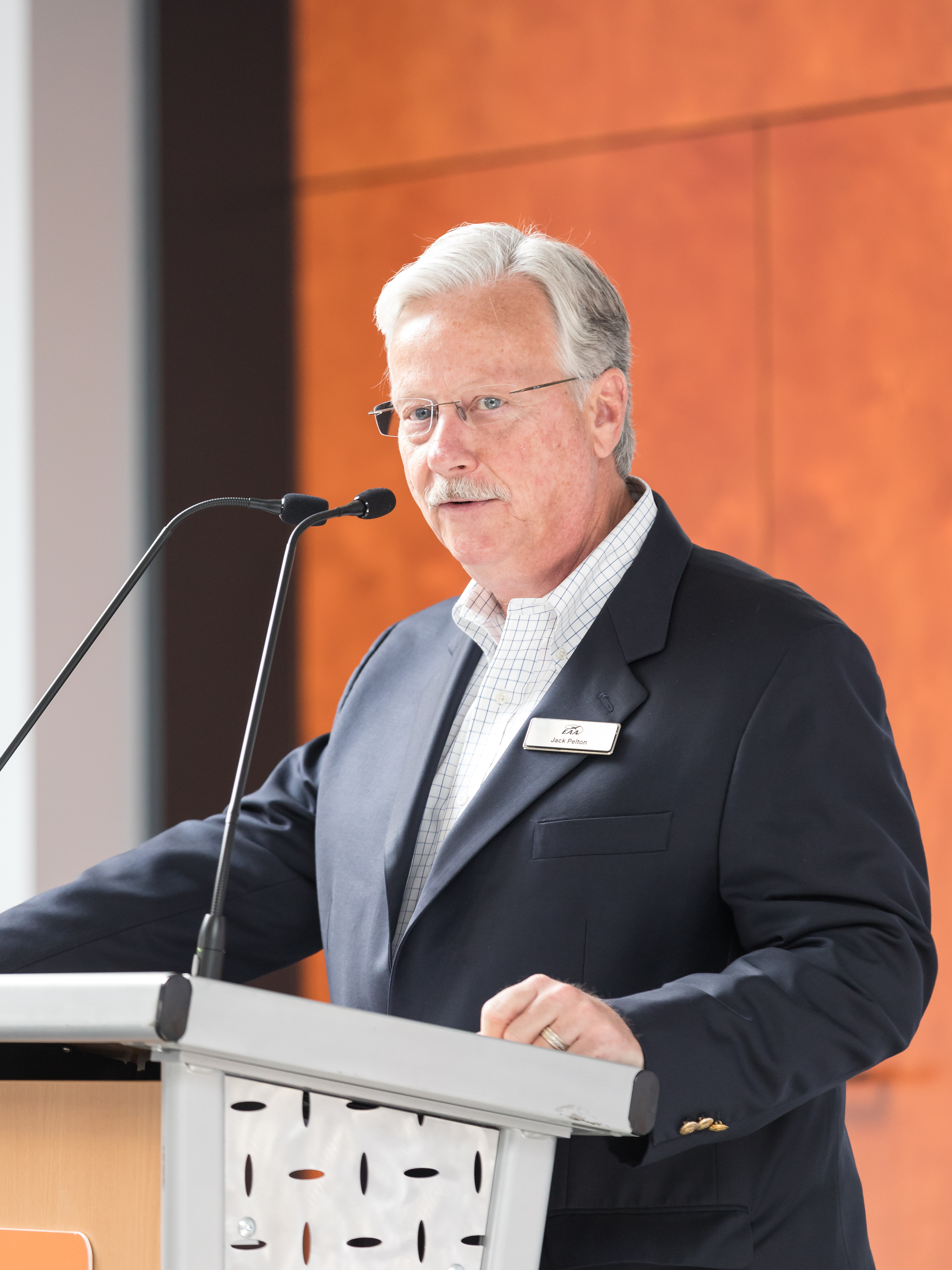
Chairman and CEO Jack Pelton in 2018

The organization is overseen by a chairman, a president, a CEO and a board of directors. Paul Poberezny assumed the duties of president and CEO at the 1953 founding. In 1989 he assumed the (newly created) position of chairman of the board, and his son, aerobatic pilot Tom Poberezny, became president and CEO. In March 2009, Paul Poberezny resigned, and the board voted to elevate Tom Poberezny to chairman of the board. At AirVenture 2010, it was announced that businessman Rod Hightower would succeed Tom Poberezny as president of the organization, effective September 2010.

Hightower resigned on 22 October 2012 "effective immediately", directly after a board of directors meeting during which former Cessna chairman, president and CEO Jack J. Pelton was elected chairman. Hightower indicated he was resigning to spend more time with his family and would not relocate from St. Louis to Oshkosh. Pelton was named acting CEO and will oversee the hiring process for Hightower's permanent replacement. In response to questions about Hightower's resignation, Mac McClellan, EAA vice president of publications, stated that it was due to Hightower failing to relocate himself from his home in St. Louis to EAA headquarters in Oshkosh, as the board had expected him to. McClellan said, "I know there's all kinds of complaints, but that's not it. [The residency] was the unsolvable requirement. The board sees the president/CEO living in the Fox Valley as essential to the mission."

Local chapters may be formed whenever ten or more EAA members reside in a given area.

Chapters are encouraged to meet monthly. The first chapter meeting occurred at Flabob Airport in California, with noted aircraft designer and builder Ray Stits presiding.

In addition to the basic EAA Chapters, there are four other more specialized types of chapter: International Aerobatic, Ultralight, Vintage and Warbird.

== EAA Freedom of Flight Award ==
In addition to the Dr. August Raspet Memorial Award, EAA also presents the Freedom of Flight Award, which the organization considers its highest honor. The award is "bestowed annually to recognize contributions to aviation who closely mirror the integrity, entrepreneurship, and innovativeness of EAA members."

=== List of Recipients ===
- 2026 - Sam Graves
- 2025 – Mark Baker
- 2024 – Pete Bunce
- 2023 – Jim Irwin and Aircraft Spruce
- 2022 – James Inhofe
- 2021 – Jerry Gregoire
- 2020 – (no recipient, AirVenture canceled)
- 2019 – the Brown family and Hartzell Propeller
- 2018 – Andrew Barker and Robert Hamilton
- 2017 – Sebastien Heintz
- 2016 – Mark Van Tine
- 2015 – Sully Sullenberger and Jeff Skiles
- 2014 – Audrey Poberezny
- 2013 – John Monnett
- 2012 – Charles McGee
- 2011 – Bob Hoover
- 2010 – Sean D. Tucker
- 2009 – Harrison Ford
- 2008 – Jack J. Pelton
- 2007 – Dale and Alan Klapmeier
- 2006 – Scott Crossfield
- 2005 – Mike Melvill
- 2004 – Dick VanGrunsven
- 2003 – Jeanie MacPherson
- 2002 – Steven J. Brown
- 2001 – Dick Rutan
- 2000 – Dick Hansen
- 1999 – Dan Goldin
- 1998 – Ed Stimpson
- 1997 – Sam Johnson
- 1996 – Burt Rutan
- 1995 – (no recipient)
- 1994 – Barron Hilton
- 1993 – John Denver
- 1992 – James C. Ray
- 1991 – Ray Scholler
- 1990 – Paul Poberezny
- 1989 – Robert "Hoot" Gibson
- 1988 – Neil Armstrong
- 1987 – Cliff Robertson
- 1986 – Steve Wittman

== Aircraft ==
- EAA Biplane
- EAA Spirit of St. Louis replica
- EAA Wright Flyer Model B replica

== See also ==
- Aircraft Kit Industry Association
- Aircraft Owners and Pilots Association
- Tannkosh
