= Ace Aircraft Manufacturing Company =

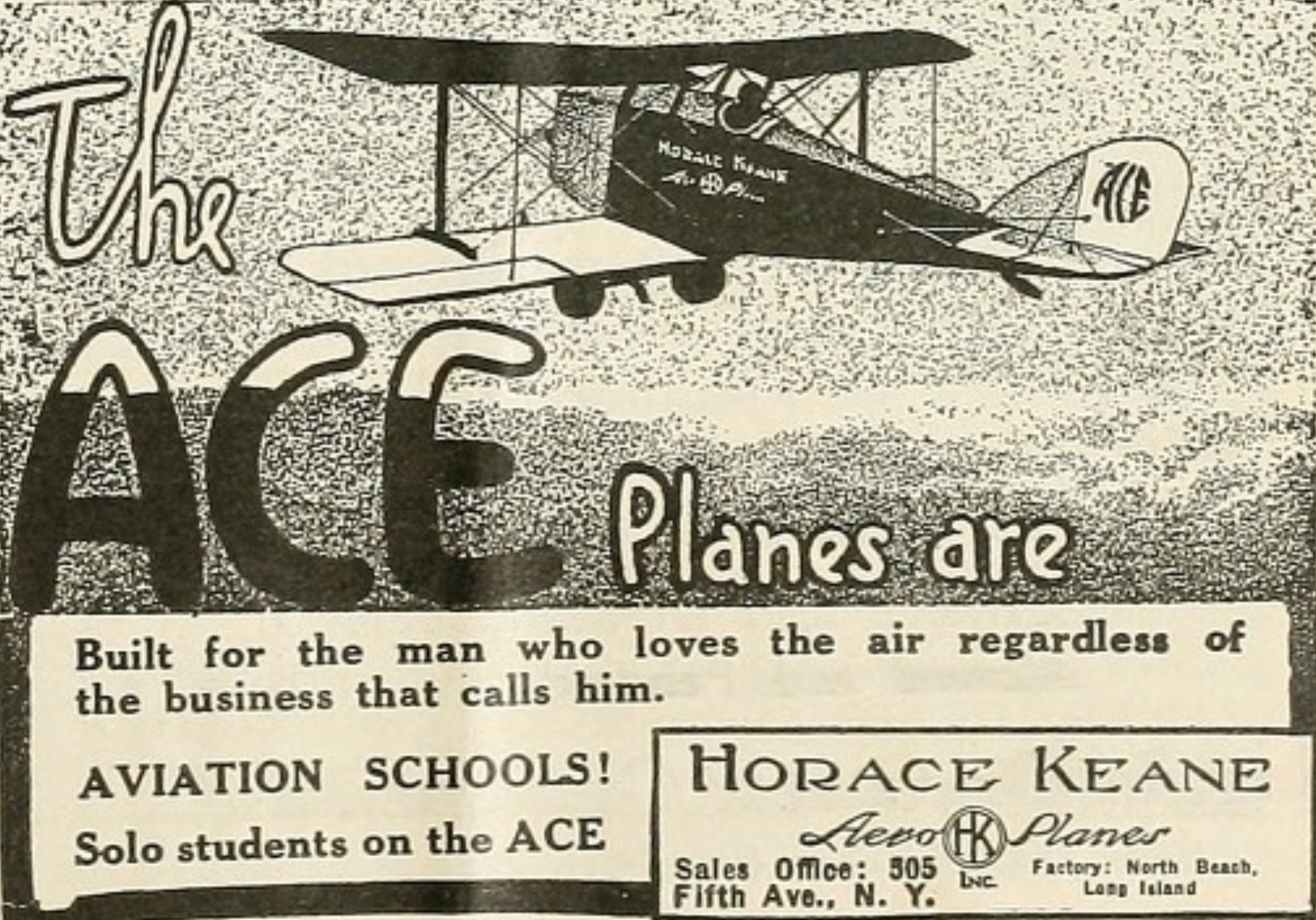
- Founded: 1929; 97 years ago
- Founder: Orland Corben
- Headquarters: Toccoa, Georgia, United States
- Products: Homebuilt aircraft
- Owner: Bill Wood

The Ace Aircraft Manufacturing Company was established in Wichita, Kansas in 1929 by Orland Corben to market the world's first homebuilt aircraft, a machine of his own design called the Baby Ace. The enterprise did not last long before US regulations changed to restrict homebuilt aircraft, and Corben was forced to stop marketing his design.

He next commenced operations in Madison, Wisconsin in 1931 under the name Corben Sport Plane and Supply Company and produced a prototype sports plane known as the Super Ace. This endeavor soon languished, and the company remained dormant until Paul Poberezny purchased its assets for $US 200 in 1952. This included plans to three aircraft designs and a variety of components.

Poberezny was one of the founders of the Experimental Aircraft Association in 1953 and was approached by Mechanix Illustrated magazine the following year to write a series of articles on building an aircraft at home. Their publication caused considerable demand for plans, but Poberezny felt compelled to divest himself of marketing them in order to avoid any potential conflict of interest with his position within the EAA.

Since then, the rights have changed hands several times. They were purchased from Poberezny by Cliff Du Charme of West Bend, Wisconsin, who sold them to Edwin T. Jacob of McFarland, Wisconsin in 1961. Mr. Jacob sold them in 1965 to Thurman Baird of Asheville, North Carolina, who also owned the rights to the American Flea and the Heath Parasol aircraft. The rights were purchased from Baird's estate in 1986 by Denny Meadows of Chesapeake, West Virginia, who sold them to the current owner, Bill Wood of Toccoa, Georgia in 1998.

== Products ==
- Baby Ace
- Junior Ace
- Ace Scooter

== Gallery ==
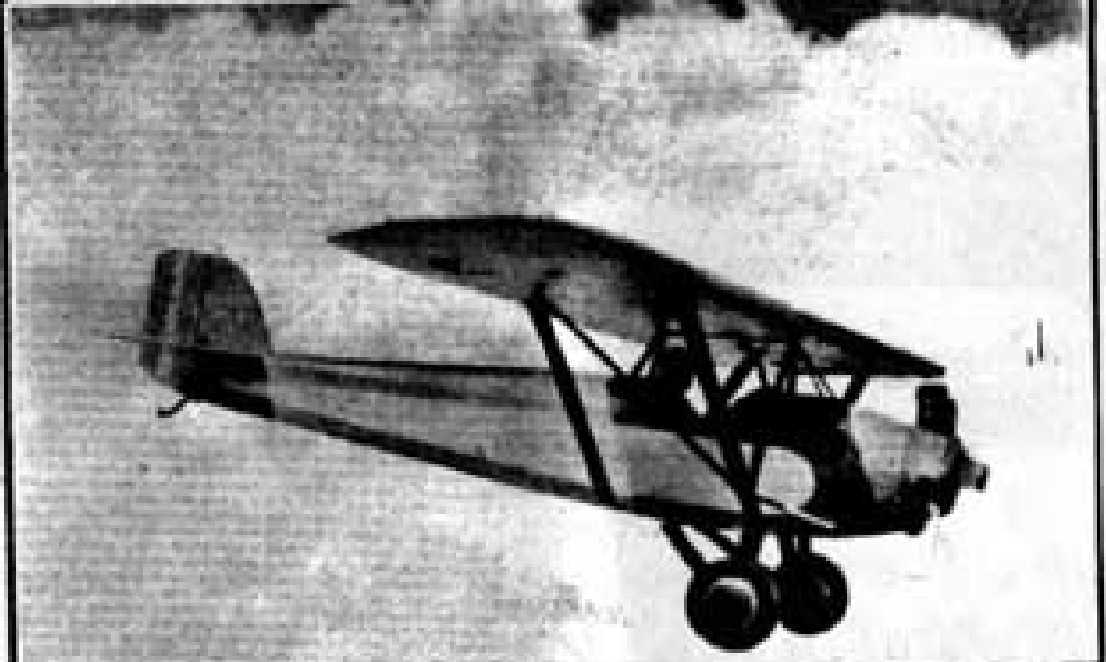
A Corben Baby Ace

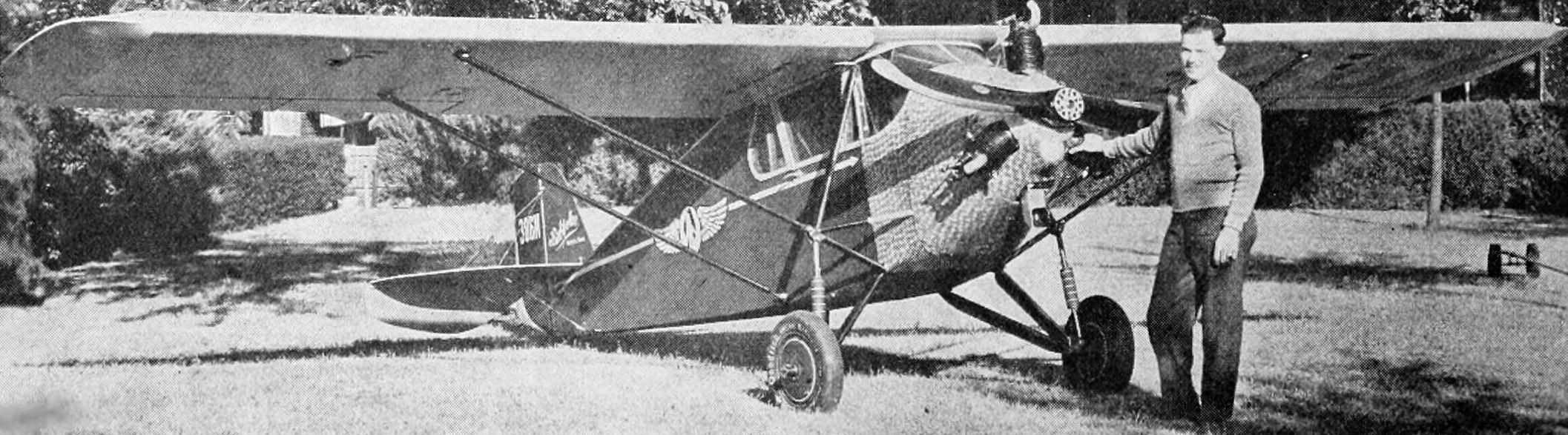
A Baby Ace SSP

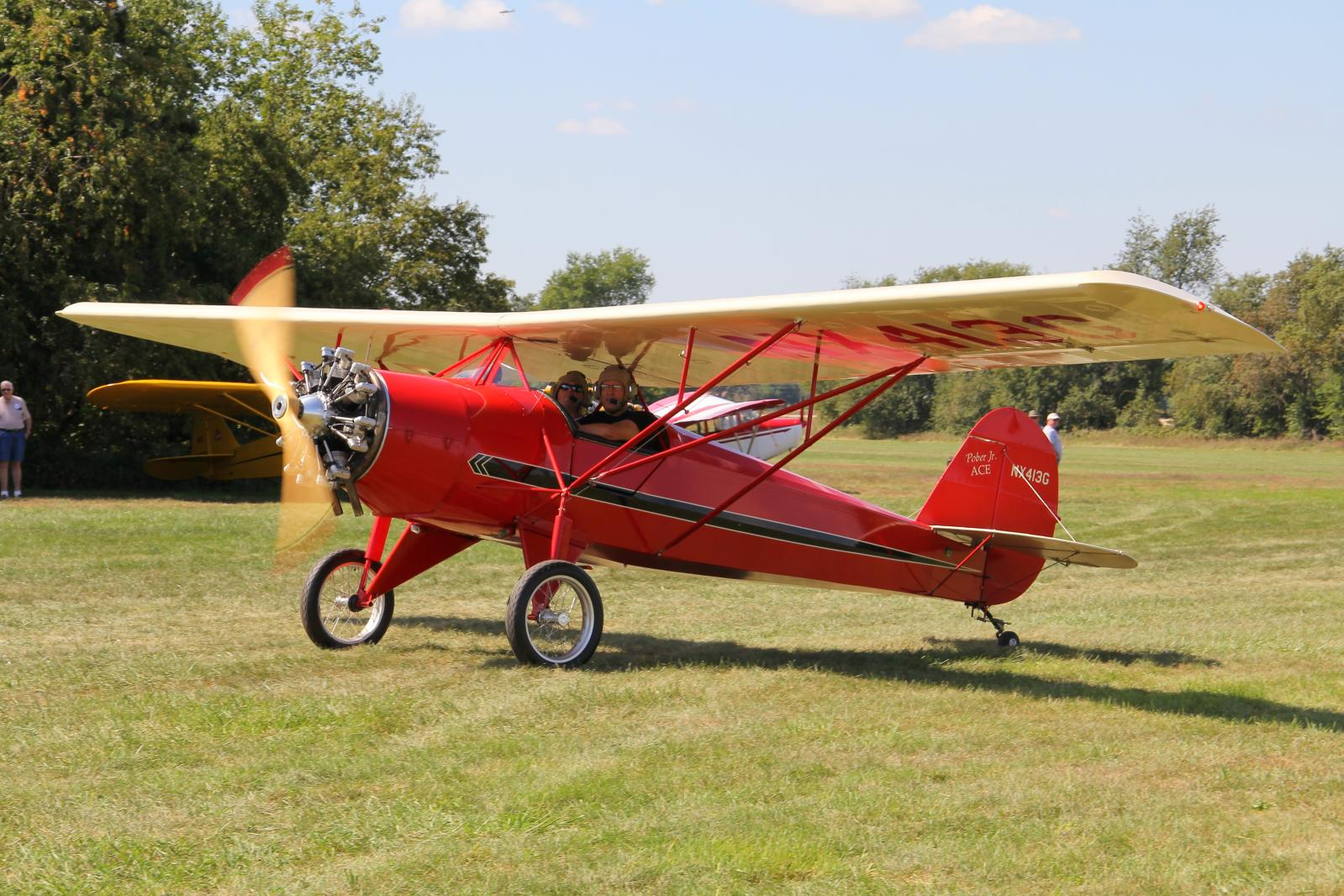
A Junior Ace
