= Accrosport =

Accrosport may refer to:

- Acro Sport I and Acro Sport II, a type of aerobatic sports aeroplane
- Ovo (Cirque du Soleil), a dance sequence
- A range of athletic or sports activities including:
  - A human pyramid
  - A Castell
  - A Human tower (gymnastic formation)
