= Ace Baby Ace =

Homebuilt aircraft design by Orland Corben

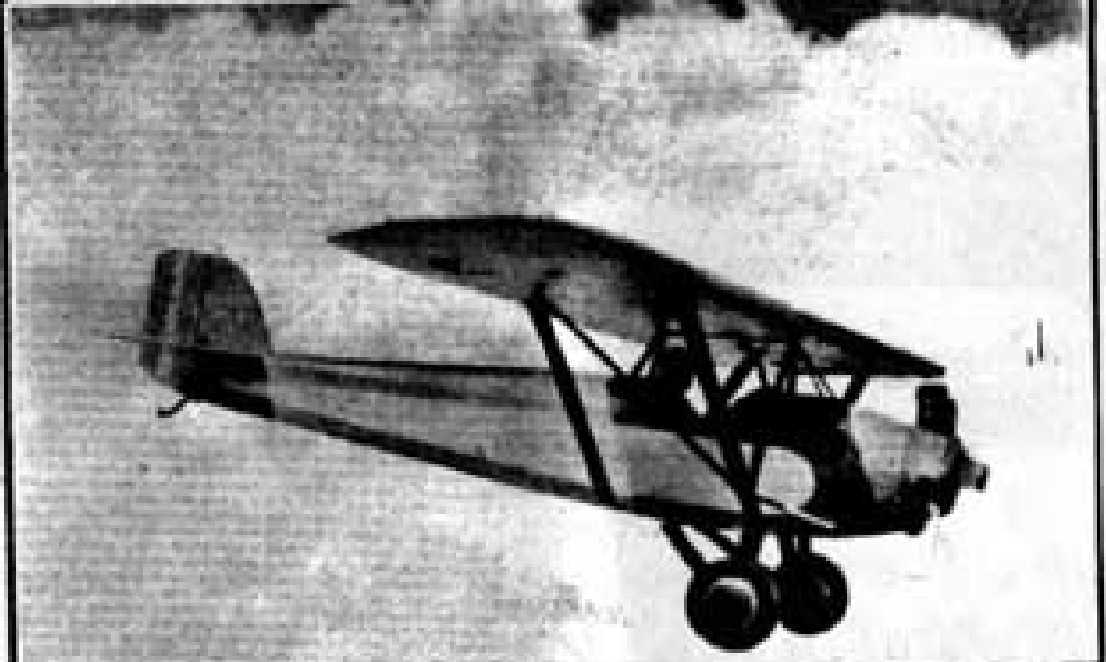

General information
- Type: Sports aircraft
- National origin: USA
- Manufacturer: Acro Sport
- Designer: Orland Corben
- Number built: 453 (2011)

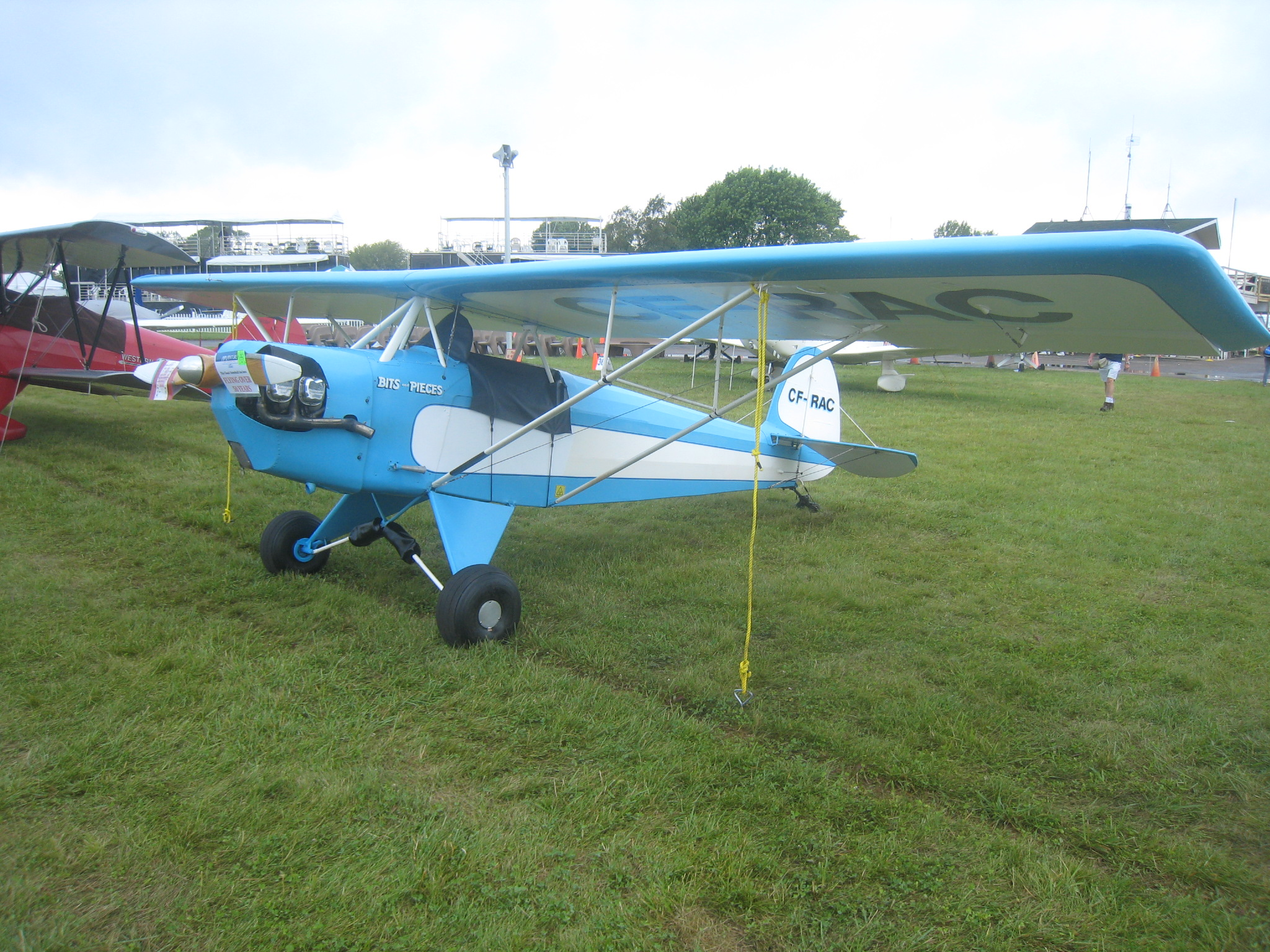
1958 Baby Ace

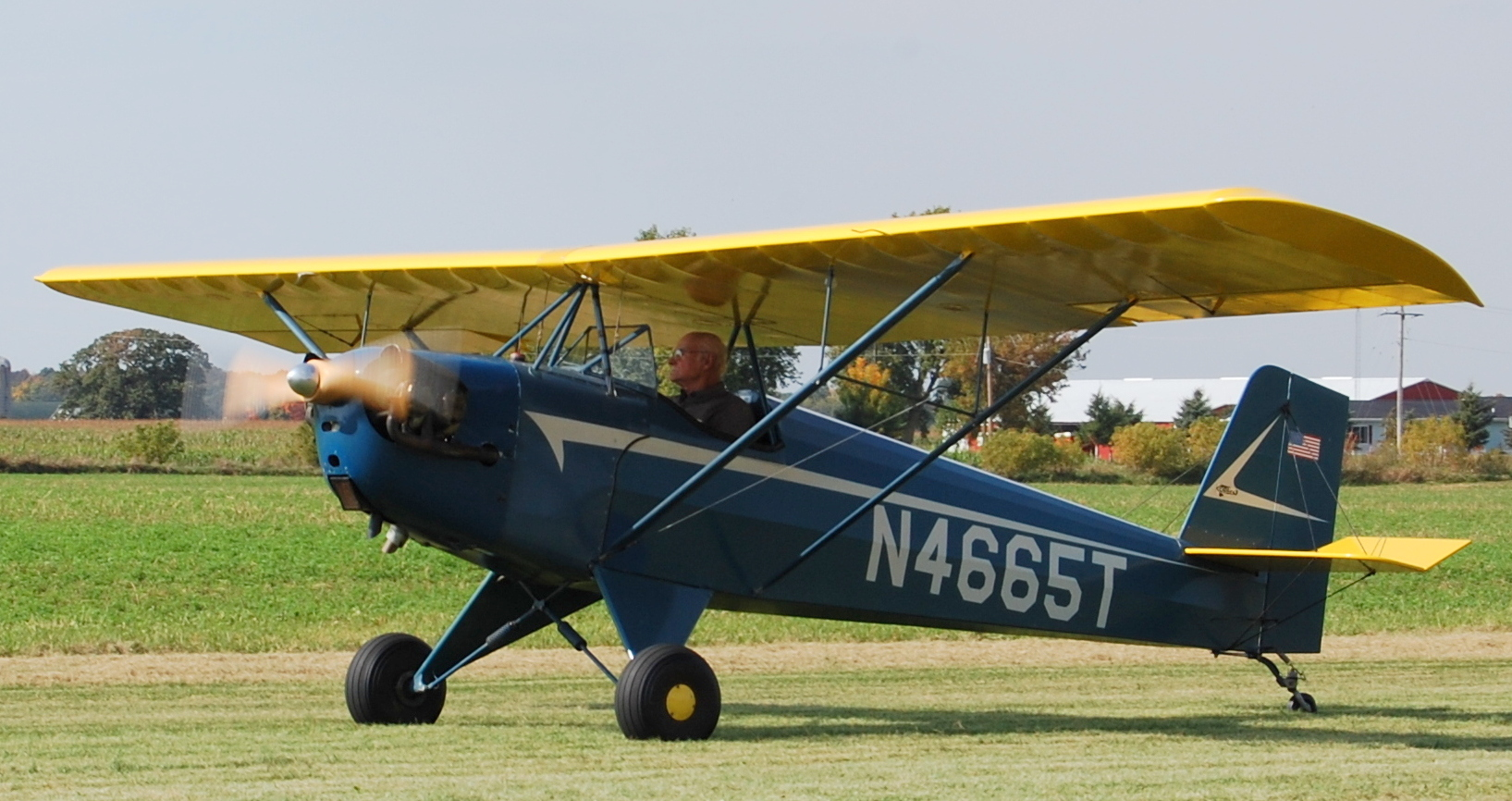
1965 Baby Ace Model D

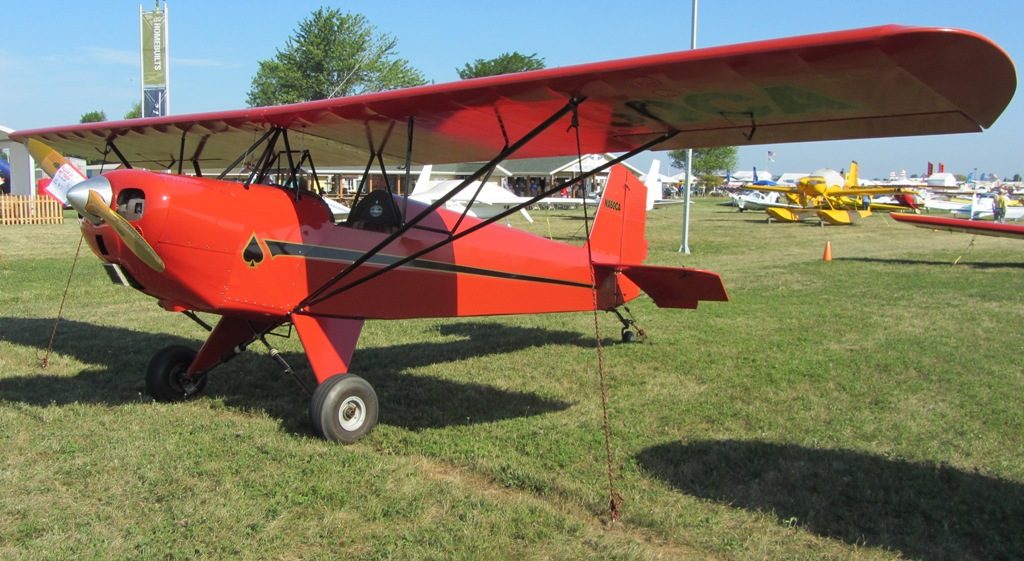
1974 Baby Ace

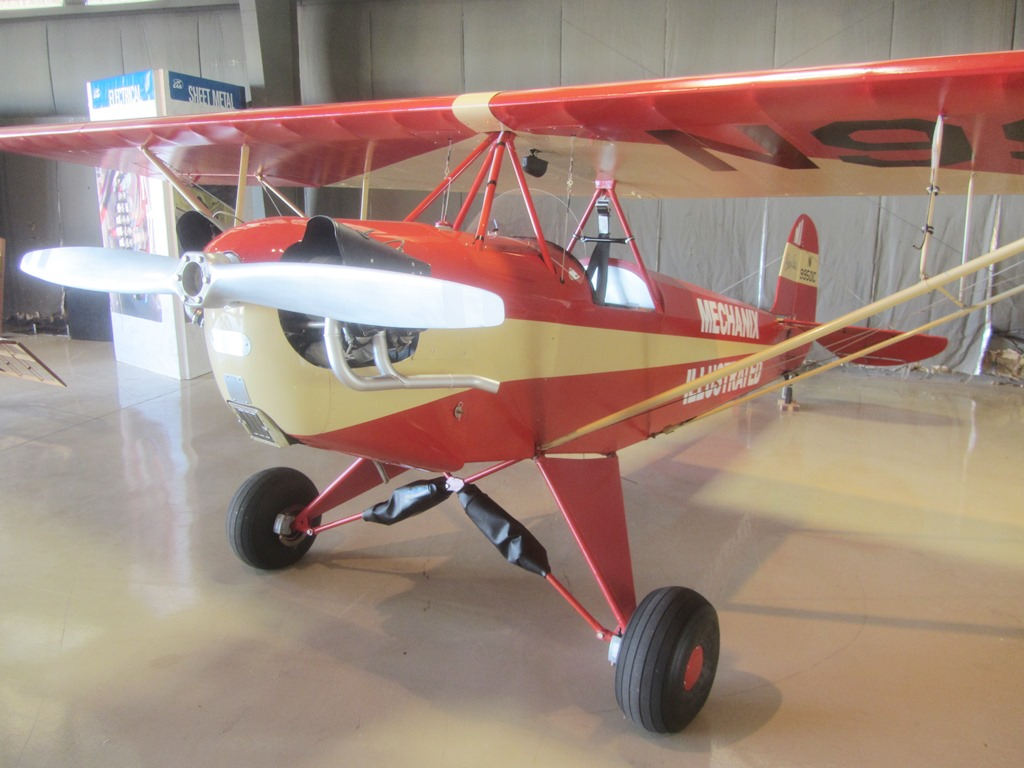
EAA Mechanix Illustrated Baby Ace

The Ace Baby Ace, a single-seat, single-engine, parasol wing, fixed-gear light airplane, was marketed as a homebuilt aircraft when its plans were first offered for sale in 1929 — one of the first homebuilt aircraft plans available in the United States. Plans are still available and Baby Aces are still being built. Orland Corben designed a series of aircraft for the Ace Aircraft Manufacturing Company, the Baby Ace, Junior Ace, and Super Ace. Corben's name was associated with the aircraft, and it is commonly known as the Corben Baby Ace.

== Design ==
=== Original ===
The Baby Ace is a single-seat parasol wing monoplane of conventional taildragger configuration. Individual examples have been configured with tricycle landing gear.

The wing uses a Clark Y-cross-section airfoil; spars and ribs are spruce. The steel-tube parallel wings struts simplified internal wing structure, and enabled the wings to fold back for over-the-road towing.

The fuselage is of fabric-covered tubular construction, and wing struts are steel tube. There is a door in the right side. Streamlining and fairing was largely done with balsa wood.

Its landing gear is a split-axle type, with bungee cord suspension, similar to gear of the Piper Cub. Some are fitted with brakes, using Aeronca-type heel pedals.

=== Evolutions ===
Under the Corben Sport Plane and Supply Co. (Peru, Indiana), two versions were offered, using the same wings, tails, controls and landing gear: a single-seat. open-cockpit, parasol-wing model (the Baby Ace) and an enclosed, two-seat, high-wing version (Junior Ace).

In 1955 Paul Poberezny, founder of the Experimental Aircraft Association, redesigned the plane with Stan J. Dzik (former Waco Aircraft engineer), calling its version the Model C. EAA sold the rights to the planes to Cliff DuCharme (West Bend, Wisconsin), and the plane was redesigned for production, becoming the Model D (first flight: November 15, 1956). The similarly redesigned two-seat Junior Ace, became the Junior Ace Model E.

=== Powerplants ===
The first example flew with a Heath-Henderson B-4 modified motorcycle engine. However, a detachable motor mount accommodated an easy change of engines.

Later models utilized various engines -- facilitated by the removeable motor mount -- including the 45 hp (34 kW) Szekely SR-3, 40 hp (30 kW) Salmson AD9, 35 hp (26 kW) Continental A-40, or 30 hp (22 kW) Heath B4. A variety of aircraft powerplants may be used, typically in the 65–100 hp (48–75 kW) range. Most versions flying today use the Continental A65 aircraft engine. Examples have been built using 70 hp (50 kW) Corvair engines.

== Operational history ==
The original Baby Ace was built in 1929, in Topeka, Kansas. Designer O.G. ("Ace") Corben later established the Corben Sportplane Company (Madison, Wisconsin), where six Baby Aces were built, with kits also sold.

The Corben Sport Plane and Supply Co. (Peru, Indiana), began producing the Baby Ace both in kit form and as a complete, flying aircraft. Kits included pre-welded assemblies for the fuselage, controls, tail and landing gear. Two models were offered, using the same wings, tails, controls and landing gear: a single-seat. open-cockpit, parasol-wing model, and an enclosed, two-seat, high-wing version.

In America, state and federal laws banned homebuilding and flight in the uncertified designs by 1938. In 1948, Experimental aircraft were allowed to be built again in America.

In 1952, EAA founder Paul Poberezny bought the rights to the Ace designs for $200, and produced a sub-$800 Baby Ace that was featured in Mechanix Illustrated (; some say Popular Mechanics). The series of articles were in conjunction with a CAA effort to revitalize American aviation by promoting amateur built aircraft. The articles drew intense national interest, resulting in hundreds of the planes being built, with various engines—and elevating then-obscure EAA to national prominence.

To avoid compromising its non-profit status, EAA sold the rights to the planes to Cliff DuCharme (West Bend, Wisconsin), who resumed kit production, with a revised Model D (first flight: November 15, 1956). and a revised Junior Ace Model E.

Subsequently, plans, parts, and kits for both the Baby Ace and Junior Ace became available from Thurman Baird's Ace Aircraft Manufacturing Company (Asheville, North Carolina). "Progressive" kits (buy sections as you build) also became available. and remain so, as of 2015.

In 1974, aviation historians John Underwood and Peter Bowers reported 200 Baby Aces were flying, with only one prewar example still active. They noted that only a very few of the Junior Aces had been built before the 1930s CAA crackdown on amateur-built aircraft, with just two of the 1930s two-seaters still flying. However, in 1979, aviation journalist Don Dwiggins estimated the number of flying Baby Aces in the United States and Canada had dwindled to around 70.

A 1958 Baby Ace is currently the oldest Canadian homebuilt aircraft flying.

== Variants ==
Baby Ace
Single-seat
Super Ace
Single-seat powered by a Ford Model A automotive engine. Plans updated by EAA founder Paul Poberezny.
Jr. Ace
Two-seat side by side variant.
Pober Jr Ace
Updated plans of the Jr. Ace model

== Specifications (Baby Ace D) ==
Data from

General characteristics

- Crew: One
- Length: 17 ft 8.75 in (5.4039 m)
- Wingspan: 26 ft 5 in (8.05 m)
- Height: 6 ft 7.75 in (2.0257 m)
- Wing area: 112.3 sq ft (10.43 m^{2})
- Aspect ratio: 6.21
- Airfoil: Clark Y (modified)
- Empty weight: 575 lb (261 kg)
- Max takeoff weight: 950 lb (431 kg)
- Fuel capacity: 36.4 L (9.6 US gal; 8.0 imp gal); alternatively reported as: 66 L (17 US gal; 15 imp gal)
- Powerplant: 1 × Continental A65 (most common) / Continental A80 / Continental C65 / Continental C85 / (Salmson, Szekely, or Anzani equivalents) 4-cylinder air-cooled horizontally-opposed piston engines 65–85 hp (48–63 kW)
- Propellers: 2-bladed fixed-pitch propeller

Performance

- Maximum speed: 110 mph (180 km/h, 96 kn) at sea level (65 hp (48 kW) engine at max. T-O weight
- Cruise speed: 100 mph (160 km/h, 87 kn) to 105 mph (91 kn; 169 km/h) max.
- Stall speed: 35 mph (56 km/h, 30 kn)
- Range: 350 mi (560 km, 300 nmi)
- Service ceiling: 16,000 ft (4,900 m)
- Rate of climb: 1,200 ft/min (6.1 m/s)
- Take-off run: 200 ft (60 m)
- Landing run: 250 ft (80 m)

== See also ==
- List of civil aircraft

Aircraft of comparable role, configuration, and era

- Heath Parasol
- Pober Pixie
- Lee L-1P-S "Little Mixer"
- Kaminskas Jungster II
