= Poberezny P-5 Pober Sport =

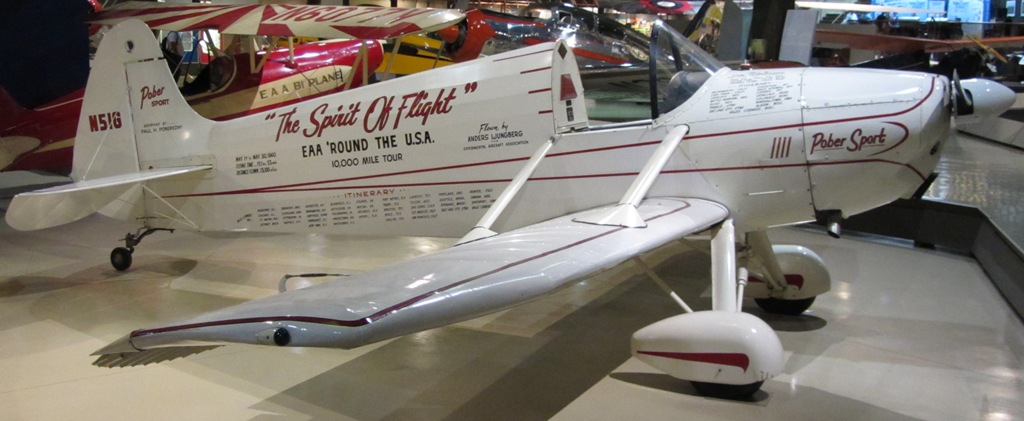
- P-5 Pober Sport on display

General information
- Type: Homebuilt aircraft
- National origin: United States of America
- Designer: Paul Poberezny, Norm Poberezney, Ron Duhamel
- Number built: 1

History
- First flight: 7 July 1959

The P-5 Pober Sport is an early low-wing homebuilt aircraft designed by Experimental Aircraft Association founder Paul Poberezny. The one example built was flown across the country to every EAA chapter at the time.

== Design and development ==
The first drawings of the Pober Sport were published in the November 1956 issue of the experimenter.

The Pober Sport is a strut-braced, low-wing, taildragger aircraft.

The fuselage is a modification of the Ace Baby Ace. The landing gear is from a J-3 Cub. The fabric covered aluminium wings are from a high-wing Luscombe Aircraft design. The elevators are controlled with push-pull tubes.

== Operational history ==
The Pober Sport was introduced at the 1959 EAA convention. During the sourcing of the parts, Poberezny used a C-47 to pick up the Luscome wings, and started work on the ailerons while in-flight. Anders "Andy" Ljungberg later toured the United States on a 72 stop tour with the aircraft to visit every EAA chapter in the country. The tour was broadcast and monitored by amateur radio operators along the route. The aircraft was donated to the EAA AirVenture Museum in Oshkosh, Wisconsin in 1975.

== Specifications (Poberezney P-5 Pober Sport) ==
Data from Experimenter

General characteristics

- Capacity: 1
- Length: 18 ft 1 in (5.51 m)
- Wingspan: 23 ft 1 in (7.04 m)
- Height: 6 ft (1.8 m)
- Wing area: 88 sq ft (8.2 m^{2})
- Empty weight: 570 lb (259 kg)
- Gross weight: 900 lb (408 kg)
- Fuel capacity: 18 US gallons (68 litres)
- Powerplant: 1 × Continental C-85 , 85 hp (63 kW)

Performance

- Cruise speed: 110 kn (130 mph, 210 km/h)
- Wing loading: 10.2 lb/sq ft (50 kg/m^{2})

== See also ==
Aircraft of comparable role, configuration, and era

- Coser-Oonk CO-2
- Stits Playboy
