= Maple Grove Airport =

Public use airport in Fowlerville, Michigan

- IATA: none; ICAO: none; FAA LID: 65G

Summary
- Owner: Lundy LLC
- Operator: Helicopter Air Specialty Service
- Serves: Fowlerville, MI
- Time zone: UTC−05:00 (-5)
  - Summer (DST): UTC−04:00 (-4)
- Elevation AMSL: 906 ft / 276 m
- Coordinates: 42.71805°N 84.06068°W
- Interactive map of Maple Grove Airport

Runways
Direction	Length		Surface
Direction	ft	m	Surface
9/27	3,050	930	Turf

Helipads
Number	Length		Surface
Number	ft	m	Surface
H1	32	10	Turf

Statistics (2021)
- Aircraft Operations: 4,472

Maple Grove Airport (FAA LID: 65G) is a privately owned, public-use airport located 3 miles north of Fowlerville, Michigan. The airport is on an elevation of 906 ft (276 m).

== Facilities and aircraft ==
The airport has two runways, both of which are made of turf. Runway 9/27 is 3050 x 110 ft (930 x 34 m), and runway 18/36 is 2000 x 113 ft (610 x 32 m).

For the 12-month period ending December 31, 2021, the airport had 4,472 aircraft operations, an average of 86 per week. It was entirely general aviation. At the time, 5 aircraft were based at the airport, all single-engine airplanes.

== Maple Grove Heliport ==
The airport is directly adjacent to the Maple Grove Heliport, which itself operates 4 helipads designated as H1, H2, H3, and H4. These helipads measure 32 x 32 ft (10 x 10 m), 12 x 12 ft (4 x 4 m), 20 x 20 ft (6 x 6 m), and 50 x 50 ft (15 x 15 m), respectively. The heliport has an additional 8,000 annual operations as of December 2017, or 22 per day. 8 helicopters are based there.

The Helicopter Air Specialty Service is located on the property. It is a Robinson Service Center that owns the Maple Grove Heliport and manages the Maple Grove Airport.

== Events ==
The airport hosts a number of events for pilots, nearby residents, and aviation enthusiasts. Such examples include fly-ins, fundraisers, and cookouts, particularly in partnership with the Fowlerville Rotary Club. Events allow participants to visit with pilots and their aircraft, tour the airport, and interact with antique warbird aircraft on display. Skydivers also often perform. Visitors are encouraged to visit the nature immediately surrounding the airport, and camping is encouraged.

The airport is home to the Capital City Skydiving Club, which hosts skydiving opportunities, lessons, and lunches for jumpers.

== Accidents and incidents ==
- On July 22, 2001, a Cessna 182T sustained substantial damage when it overran runway 18 while landing at the Maple Grove Airport. The aircraft went through a bean field and into a pond, where it flipped over. The student pilot flying reported he flared at 60-65 knots, but the flare lasted longer than normal. Upon touchdown, the student applied full brakes, but the aircraft kept sliding and became airborne again. The student tried adding full power to clear a hill nearby but failed to attain enough lift to clear trees nearby. Thus, the student cut off the power and slid into the pond. The probable cause of the accident was found to be the student pilot's failure to maintain aircraft control during landing. Factors relating to this accident were the misjudged flare, exceeding proper touchdown point, the delayed go-around, the student pilot's improper in-flight decisions, and the pond.
- On October 11, 2010, a Drake Ronald A Acro Sport 1 impacted trees and terrain at the Maple Grove Airport while performing takeoffs and landings at the airport. A witness reported that the pilot had overshot the runway and executed a go-around prior to the accident. On the accident approach, the airplane touched down hard and bounced. The witness heard the sound of the engine increase, but not to a level consistent with takeoff power. He noted that the nose of the airplane was high. The airplane began to "waffle" and turn to the left, low over the trees. The probable cause of the accident was found to be the pilot's loss of control during a go-around maneuver following a bounced landing.
- On November 17, 2015, an Aeronca 7AC inadvertently became airborne during the takeoff roll while practicing landings in gusty wind conditions. The airplane descended back to the runway and impacted the terrain. The probable cause of the accident was found to be the pilot's failure to maintain pitch control during the takeoff roll, which resulted in an impact with terrain.
- On October 8, 2016, an unspecified event believed to be a runway excursion on takeoff involving a Diamond DA 20 occurred at the airport.

== See also ==
- List of airports in Michigan
