= Lee L-1P-S "Little Mixer" =

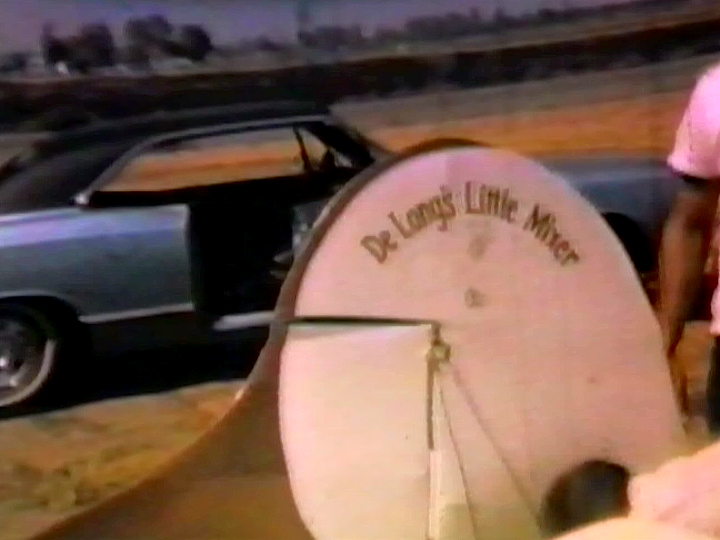
Lee L-1P-S "Little Mixer" Also known as DeLong's Little Mixer First flight of one homebuilder's version in the late 1960s near Fresno, California.

General information
- Type: Homebuilt aircraft
- National origin: United States of America
- Designer: Jim McManiman, Darrell F. DeLong

History
- First flight: July 1954
- Developed from: McManiman Homebuilt

The Lee L-1P-S "Little Mixer" is a single place parasol homebuilt aircraft designed and built in the 1950s.

== Development ==
The "Little Mixer" is a modification of a homebuilt design and fuselage first constructed by Jim McManiman of Eugene, Oregon in 1930. The airframe was licensed under Oregon state rules, and predated McManiman's later design, the McManiman “Baby Fleet”.

== Design ==
The Little Mixer is a high wing open cockpit parasol with a fabric covered steel tube fuselage. The cowling and landing gear are from a Piper J-3 model. The wings are all-wood with fabric covering.

== Specifications (Lee L-1P-S "Little Mixer") ==
Data from Experimenter

General characteristics

- Capacity: 1
- Length: 17 ft 8 in (5.38 m)
- Wingspan: 26 ft (7.9 m)
- Wing area: 110.5 sq ft (10.27 m^{2})
- Airfoil: Clark Y
- Empty weight: 673 lb (305 kg)
- Gross weight: 951 lb (431 kg)
- Fuel capacity: 20 US Gallons
- Powerplant: 1 × Continental A-65 , 65 hp (48 kW)

Performance

- Maximum speed: 100 kn (115 mph, 185 km/h)
- Cruise speed: 87 kn (100 mph, 160 km/h)
- Stall speed: 35 kn (40 mph, 64 km/h)
- Range: 350 nmi (400 mi, 640 km)

== See also ==
Aircraft of comparable role, configuration, and era

- Corben Baby Ace
