= Coser-Oonk CO-2 =

Homebuilt aircraft design

General information
- Type: Homebuilt aircraft
- National origin: United States
- Designer: Joseoh Coser, Jack Oonk

History
- First flight: 15 September 1959

The Coser-Oonk CO-2 "Our Lady" is a single-place, open-cockpit, low-winged monoplane homebuilt aircraft design.

== Design and development ==
The CO-2 was originally started as a mid-wing, but was changed to a low-wing for improved visibility.

The CO-2 is a single-place, strut-braced, low-wing conventional geared monoplane. The tail section is modified from a Luscombe fuselage. The wings were also sourced from a Luscombe, but strut braced from the top and shortened.

== Operational history ==
Test flights were performed at Creve Coeur Airport in 1959.

== Specifications (Coser-Oonk CO-2) ==
Data from Sport Aviation

General characteristics

- Capacity: 1
- Length: 18 ft 5 in (5.61 m)
- Wingspan: 19 ft 6 in (5.94 m)
- Wing area: 81 sq ft (7.5 m^{2})
- Empty weight: 690 lb (313 kg)
- Gross weight: 1,050 lb (476 kg)
- Fuel capacity: 14 US gallons (53 L; 12 imp gal)
- Powerplant: 1 × Continental A75 , 75 hp (56 kW)

Performance

- Cruise speed: 109 kn (125 mph, 201 km/h)
- Stall speed: 52 kn (60 mph, 97 km/h)

== See also ==
Aircraft of comparable role, configuration, and era

- Stits Playboy
- Poberezny P-5 Pober Sport
