= Acro Sport =

- Company type: Aerospace manufacturer
- Industry: Aviation
- Founded: 14 June 1977
- Defunct: 5 November 2014
- Headquarters: Hales Corners, Wisconsin, United States
- Products: Aerobatics aircraft

Acro Sport Inc was an aircraft manufacturer based in Hales Corners, Wisconsin that marketed plans for homebuilt aircraft.

The company sold plans for the Acro Sport I and Acro Sport II aerobatic biplanes, but also owned the rights to a number of other designs, including the Nesmith Cougar, Pober Pixie, Pober Junior Ace, and Pober Super Ace. All except the Cougar are designs of Paul Poberezny. The company is not affiliated with either Poberezny or the Experimental Aircraft Association.

== Aircraft designs ==
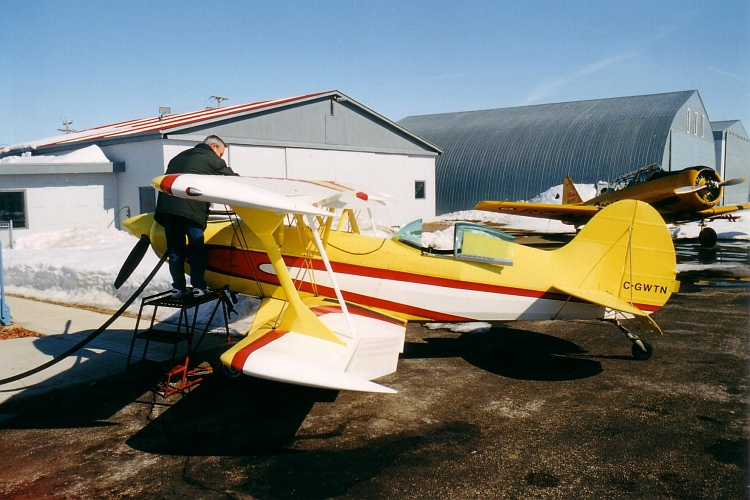
Acro Sport II biplane

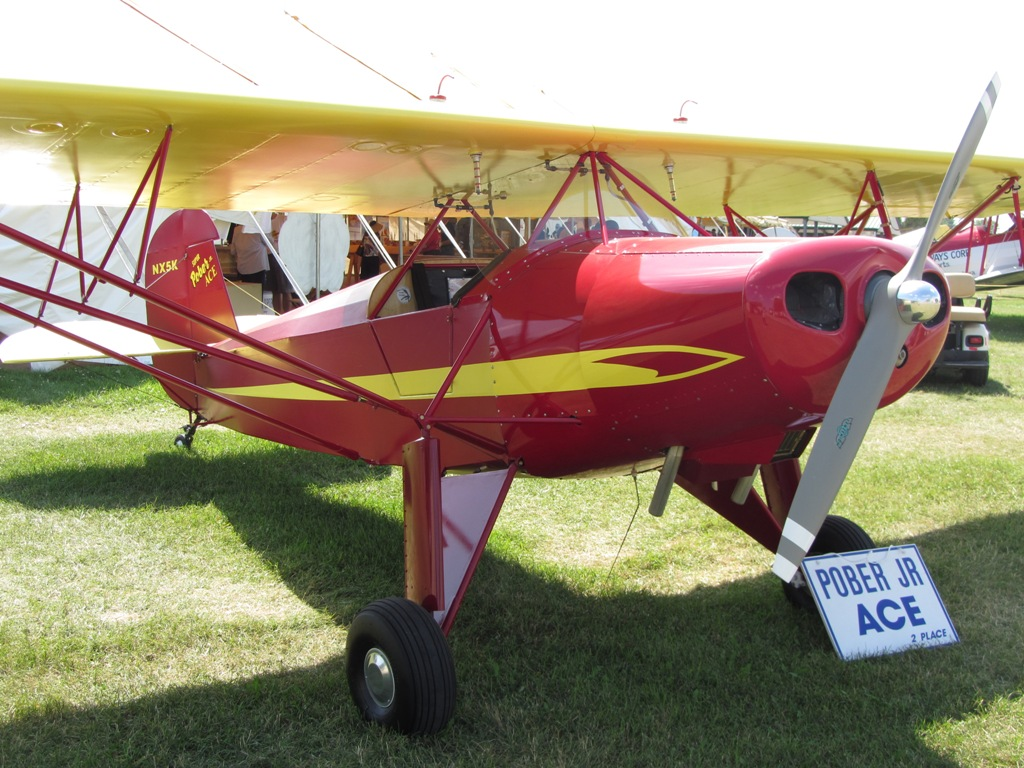
Pober Jr Ace

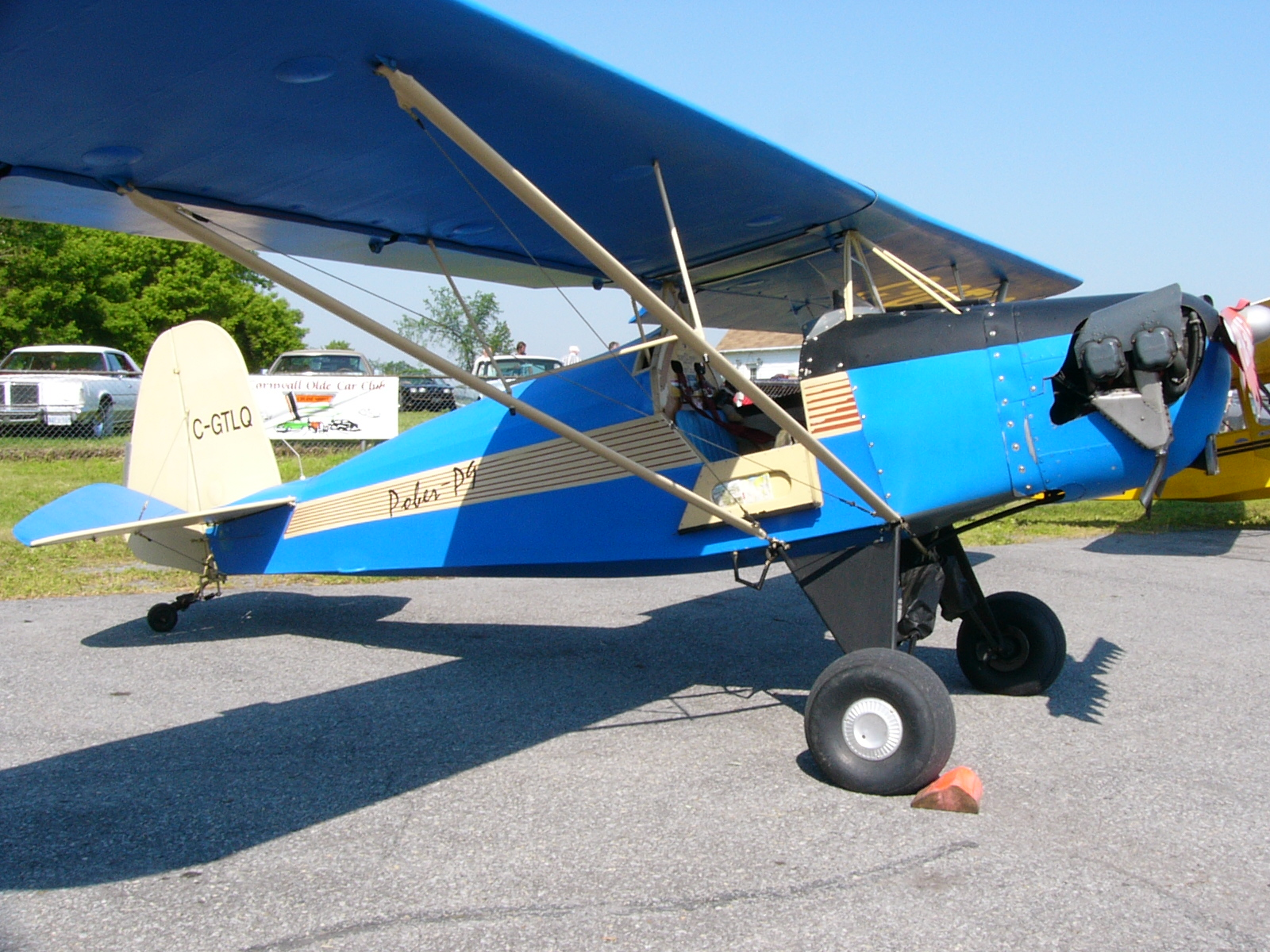
Pober Pixie
