= Waco Primary Glider =

WACO Primary Glider
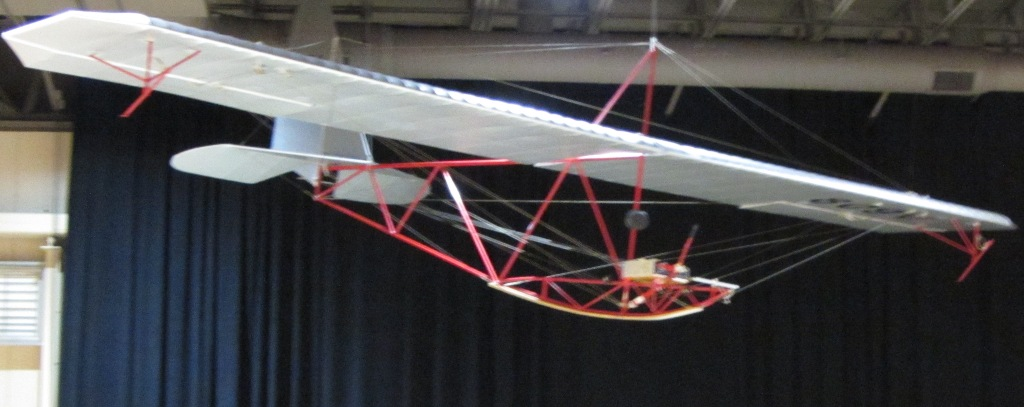
- A WACO glider replica on display

General information
- Type: Glider
- National origin: United States of America
- Manufacturer: Waco Aircraft Company
- Number built: 300

The WACO primary glider or simply WACO glider, was an early product of the Waco Aircraft Company. The low cost glider was intended to be flown from low hills or towed by a vehicle.

== Design and development ==
The WACO glider was marketed as a low-cost training aircraft for individuals or glider clubs. About 300 were produced between 1930 and 1931. Replicas have been made using both steel tube or wood frames. Plans are still available for homebuilt construction.

The glider was designed to fly at low airspeeds. It could maintain flight at 20 mph (32 km/h) with a 15 to 1 glide ratio. The fuselage is made of welded steel tubing. The wings use spruce spars, are wire supported and fabric covered. A releasable tow hook was mounted on the front.

== Aircraft on display ==
Experimental Aircraft Association founder Paul Poberezny first learned to fly in a rebuilt WACO Primary glider. In 2002 a replica was built and flown by Poberezny in 2003. It is now on display at the EAA AirVenture Museum in Oshkosh, Wisconsin.

An original WACO primary glider is in the collection of the National Air and Space Museum.

An original WACO primary glider was restored to airworthy condition by the Western Antique Aeroplane and Automobile Museum in Hood River, Oregon.

== Specifications (WACO primary glider) ==
Data from Popular Science

General characteristics

- Capacity: 1
- Length: 21 ft (6.4 m)
- Wingspan: 36 ft (11 m)
- Height: 10 ft (3.0 m)
- Wing area: 157 sq ft (14.6 m^{2})
- Empty weight: 175 lb (79 kg)

Performance

- Maximum speed: 56 kn (65 mph, 105 km/h)
- Stall speed: 17 kn (20 mph, 32 km/h)
