= Duane Cole =

American aerobatic pilot (1914–2004)

- Born: April 1, 1914; Toulon Township, Illinois
- Died: February 3, 2004 (aged 89); Burleson, Texas
- Resting place: Laurel Land Memorial Park, Fort Worth, Texas
- Known for: Aerobatics
- Spouse: Judy
- Children: Rolly, John, Karen
- Relatives: Aerobatic pilot brothers Marion, Lester & Arnold

Duane Cole (April 1, 1914–February 3, 2004) was an American aerobatic pilot.

== Early life ==
Duane earned his private license in 1938, followed by his commercial in 1939 and instructor in 1940.

Cole performed in his first airshow in 1940, followed by training cadets in the Civilian Pilot Training Program throughout World War II.

== Career ==
Cole performed from 1947 to 1963 as part of the Cole Brothers Airshows along with his brothers Arnold, Lester and Marion Cole, who remained in the business for many years. Cole flew a 65 hp clipped wing Taylorcraft BF-50. His Taylorcraft was notable for not being a high-powered aerobatic specialist plane and his routines emphasized smoothness and grace over speed and power.

Duane left the airshow business in 1963 following the death of his son, Rolly Cole, who was killed during airshow practice over an Illinois farm field practicing for the EAA fly-in held at Rockford, Illinois, when the engine failed and separated from the fuselage of his 450-HP Stearman biplane. The following year Duane was asked to produce and manage the Reno Air Races, which had been dormant for some years. Duane continued to produce the Reno races at least into the 1970s.

In 1971 Duane and his wife Judy established the Duane and Judy Cole award to individuals that promote sport aviation with the first award given to Paul Poberezny. In 1974 Cole won the Aviation /Spacewriters award for best book The Flying Coles.

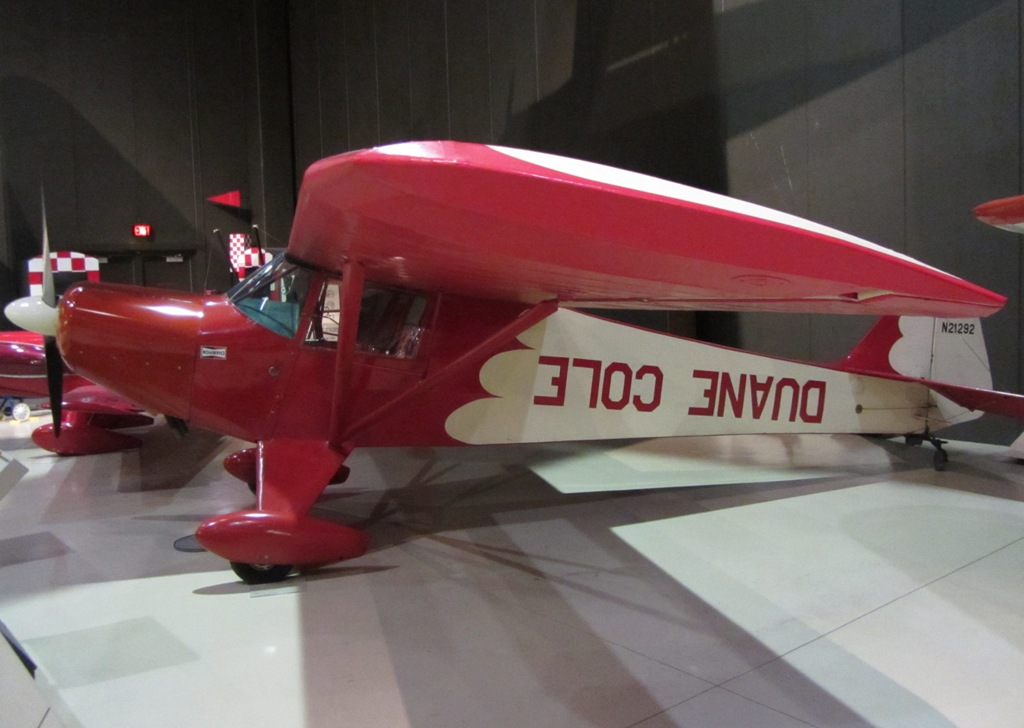
Duane Cole's Taylorcraft BF-50

Cole's Taylorcraft resides in the EAA AirVenture Museum. As the photograph shows, his name was painted on the fuselage upside down, because he spent more time inverted than upright during his routines.

== Books by Cole ==
- To a Pilot memorial to his son Rolly – 1964
- Vagabond Cub – 1967
- Conquest of Lines and Symmetry – 1971
- The Flying Coles – 1974
- Roll Around a Point – 1976
- Happy Flying Safely – 1977
