= Ace Junior Ace =

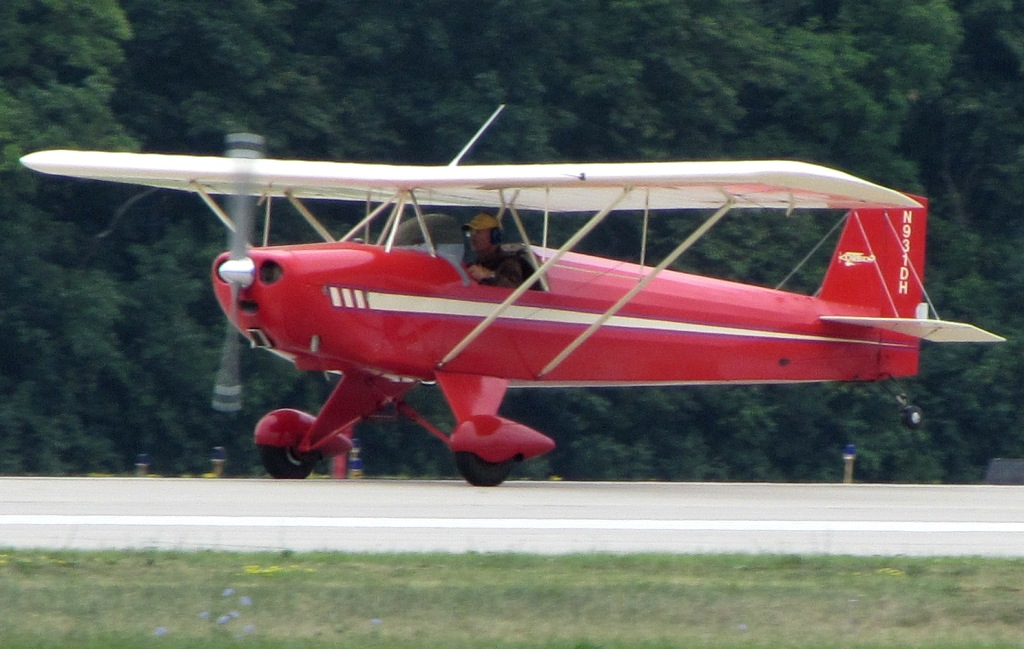

General information
- Type: Sports aircraft
- National origin: USA
- Manufacturer: Ace Aircraft Manufacturing Company
- Designer: Orland Corben
- Number built: 202 (2011)

The Ace Junior Ace is a two-seat sports aircraft that has been offered by the Ace Aircraft Manufacturing Company in kit and plans form for home building since the early 1930s. It was designed by Orland Corben.

An evolution of Corben's single-seat Baby Ace, it is a parasol wing monoplane of conventional taildragger configuration. Pilot and passenger sit side-by-side, in a cockpit that may be enclosed or left open. The fuselage is of fabric-covered tubular construction and the wings are wood. A variety of powerplants may be used, and the aircraft has a power range of 85 to 120 hp (63 to 89 kW).

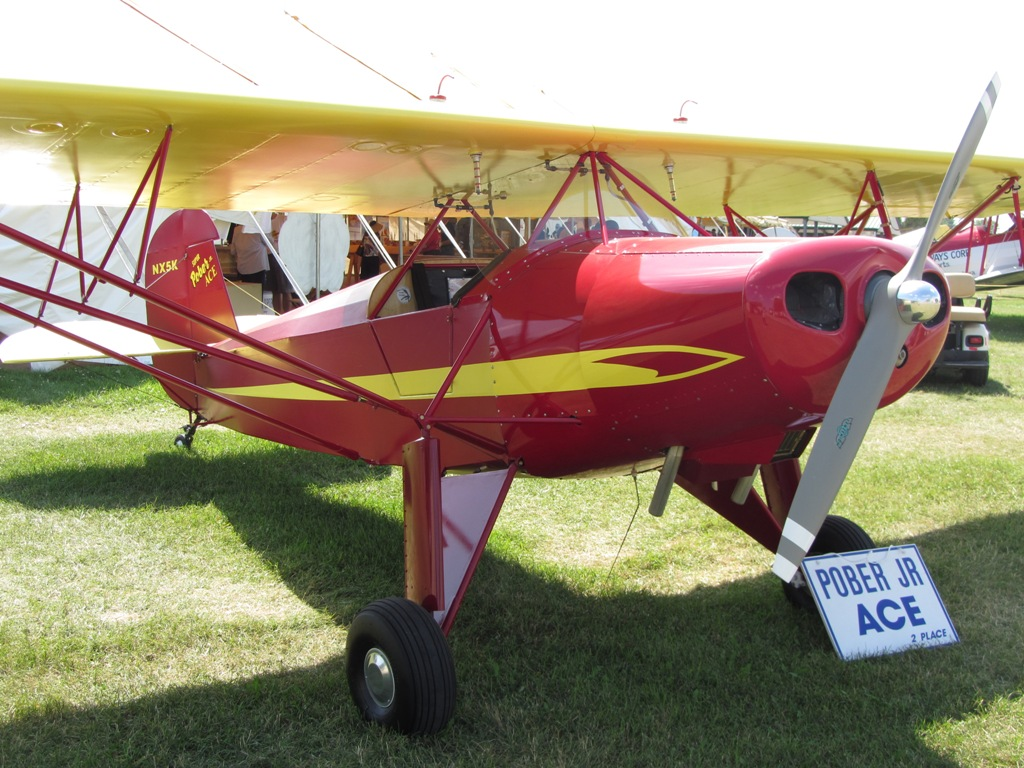
Pober Jr. Ace

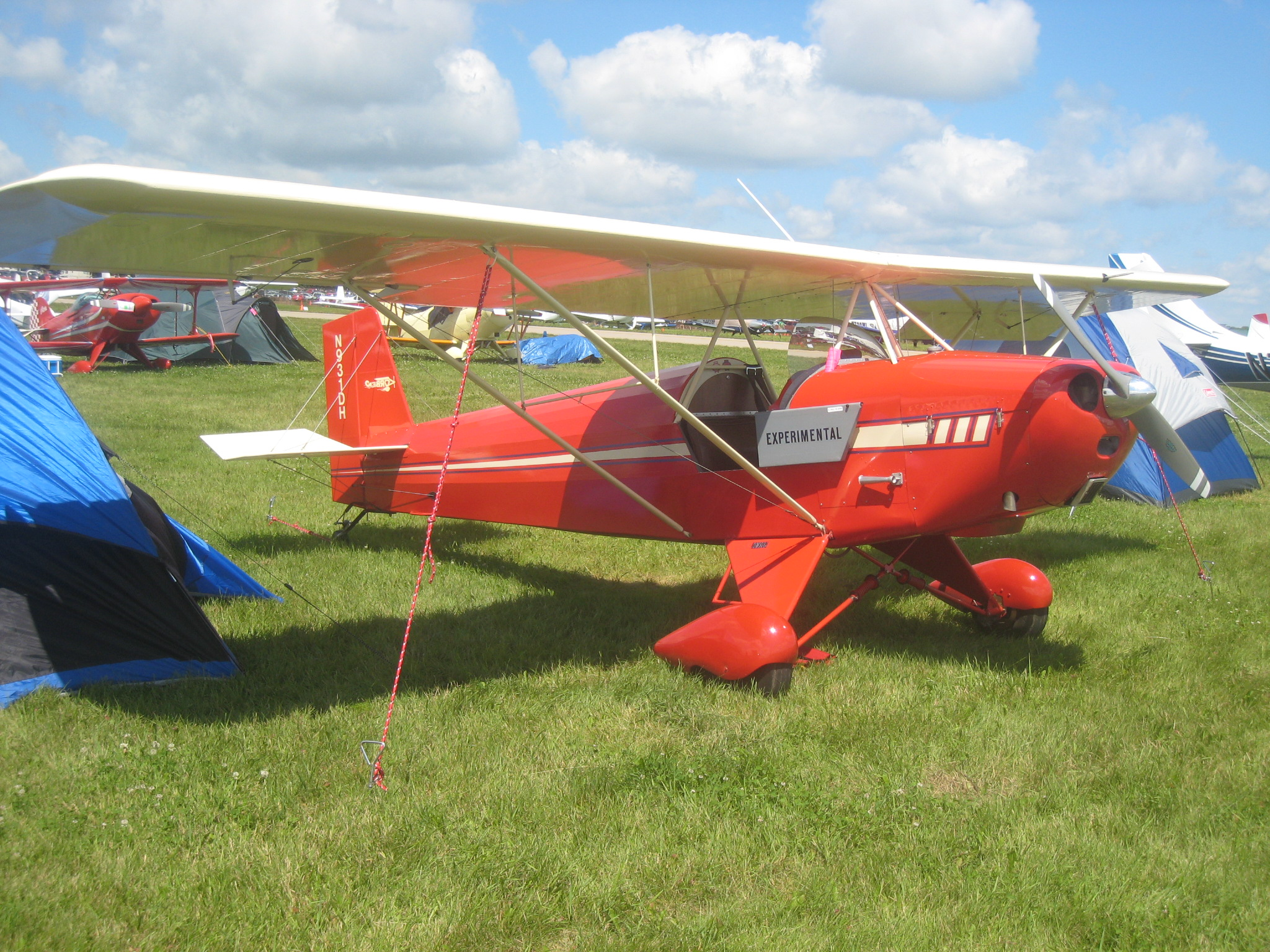
Corben Jr Ace

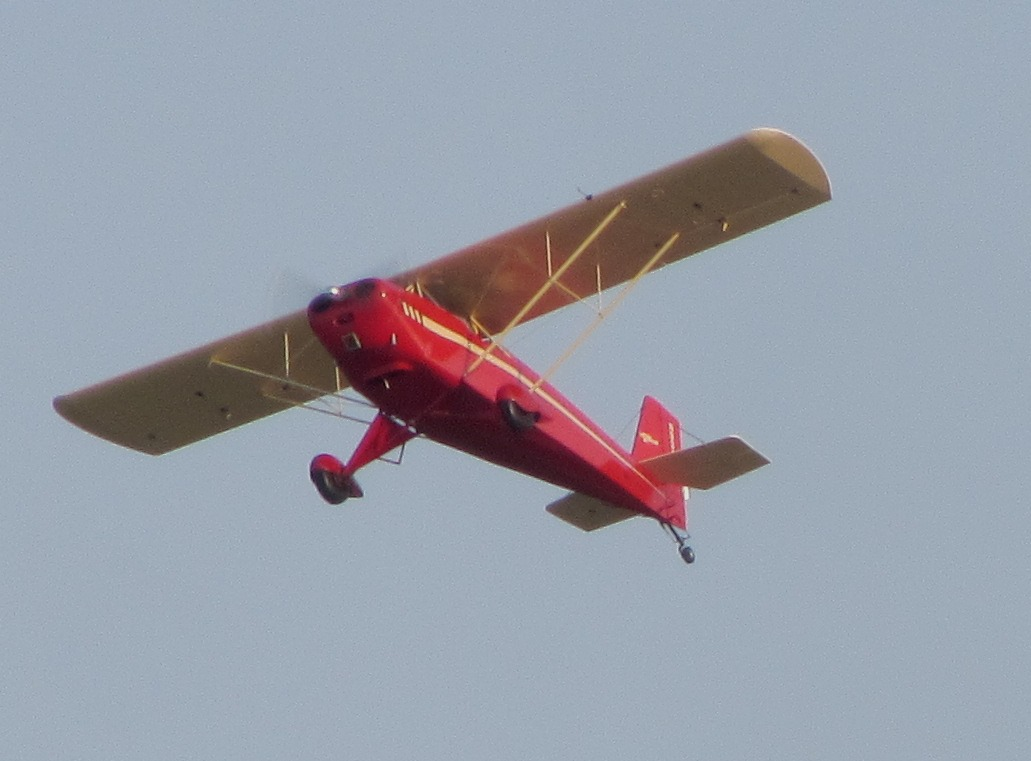
Takeoff

Experimental Aircraft Association founder Paul Poberezny widened the fuselage of the Jr Ace, added modern wheels, brakes and increased the span to 34 ft to create the Pober Jr Ace. The company Acro Sport maintains the rights to the design, and sells plans so the aircraft can be amateur-built.

== Variants ==
Baby Ace
Single seat
Super Ace
Single seat powered by a Ford Model A automotive engine. Plans updated by EAA founder Paul Poberezny.
Ace Junior Ace
Two side-by-side seat variant.
Pober Jr Ace
Updated plans of the Jr. Ace model

== Specifications (Model E) ==
Data from Jane's All the World's Aircraft 1988-9, p.647.

General characteristics

- Crew: one
- Capacity: one passenger
- Length: 18 ft 0 in (5.49 m)
- Wingspan: 26 ft 0 in (7.92 m)
- Empty weight: 809 lb (367 kg)
- Max takeoff weight: 1,335 lb (606 kg)
- Powerplant: 1 × Continental C85 air-cooled flat four, 85 hp (63 kW)

Performance

- Maximum speed: 113 kn (130 mph, 209 km/h)
- Cruise speed: 91 kn (105 mph, 169 km/h)
- Service ceiling: 10,500 ft (3,200 m)
- Rate of climb: 600 ft/min (3.0 m/s)

== See also ==
- List of civil aircraft

Related development

- Pober Super Ace
- Ace Baby Ace
