= Ace Scooter =

Scooter

General information
- Type: Homebuilt aircraft
- National origin: United States
- Manufacturer: Ace Aircraft Manufacturing Company

The Ace Scooter is an American aircraft that was designed for homebuilt construction.

== Design and development ==
The Ace Scooter is a single place, strut-braced, high wing aircraft with conventional landing gear, which is steel. The tractor engine is mounted above the wing. The open cockpit has a short rounded nose. The fuselage is of wood construction with aircraft fabric covering.

== Specifications (Scooter) ==
Data from Air Trails

General characteristics

- Crew: 1
- Length: 15 ft 8 in (4.78 m)
- Wingspan: 28 ft (8.5 m)
- Height: 7 ft (2.1 m)
- Wing area: 115 sq ft (10.7 m^{2})
- Aspect ratio: 6.75
- Empty weight: 390 lb (177 kg)
- Gross weight: 625 lb (283 kg)
- Fuel capacity: 7 U.S. gallons (26 L; 5.8 imp gal)
- Powerplant: 1 × Volkswagen air-cooled engine Horizontally opposed piston, 65 hp (48 kW)
- Propellers: 2-bladed wooden

Performance

- Maximum speed: 76 kn (88 mph, 142 km/h)
- Cruise speed: 65 kn (75 mph, 121 km/h)
- Stall speed: 30 kn (34 mph, 55 km/h)
- Service ceiling: 12,000 ft (3,700 m)
- Rate of climb: 600 ft/min (3.0 m/s)

Related development

- Flaglor Scooter
