= Marion Cole =

American aerobatic pilot (1924–2011)

Marion Franklin Cole
- Born: 9 December 1924; Toulon Township, Illinois, US
- Died: 8 July 2011 (aged 86); Louisiana, US
- Known for: Aerobatics
- Spouse: Charlene
- Children: 4
- Relatives: Duane Cole - Aerobatic pilot brother.

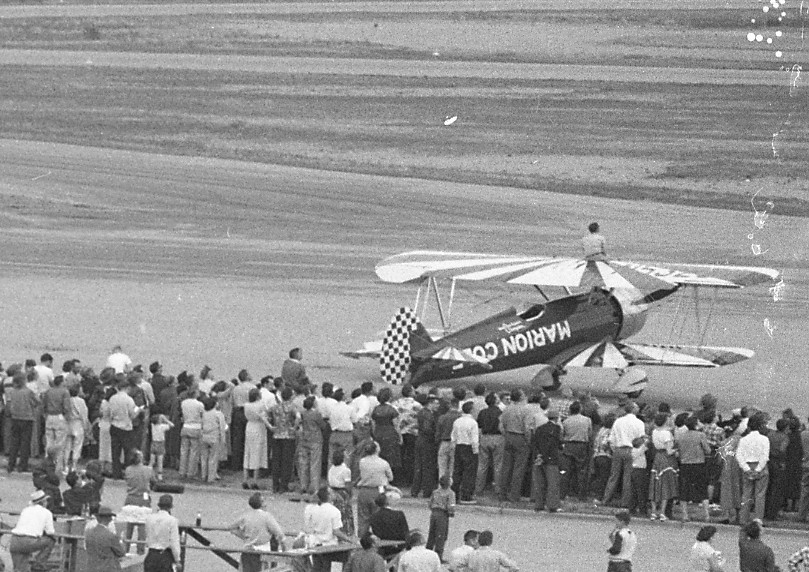
Marion Cole at an air show in Stevens Point, Wisconsin.

Marion Cole (1924–2011) was an American aerobatic pilot.

== Early life ==
Cole was a flight instructor for the United States Navy in World War II.

Cole performed from 1947-1957 as part of the Cole Brothers Airshows along with his brothers Lester and Duane Cole, who remained in the business for many years flying a clipped wing Taylorcraft.

Cole performed in a variety of aircraft. Cole flew a 450 hp 1951 Stearman 75 with wingwalking apparatus and his name painted on the sides. Cole became the 1952 National aerobatic champion in this aircraft, selling it to Cole Brother's team member Bill Adams. Cole was one of the founding members of the Red Devils aerobatic team with Bob Heuer and Gene Soucy. Cole then formed Marion Cole Air Shows. In 1971, Cole and Art Scholl purchased the first two Pitts S2A models in production, later becoming a Pitts dealer. Marion's original S-2A is still flying, and was returned from Canadian registry to US registry in 2018. In the late 1970s Cole taught aerobatic training for civilian Beechcraft Bonanza pilots in a 1968 E33C.

Marion's son Donald Cole, became the first person to solo in a Pitts S2A. His other sons became professional pilots. Cole died in 2011 from pancreatic cancer. He had flown safely for over 31,000 hours.
