= Flaglor Scooter =

Scooter
- Flaglor Scooter at Pima Air & Space Museum

General information
- Type: Ultralight aircraft
- Manufacturer: Homebuilt
- Designer: Ken Flaglor

History
- First flight: June 1967

The Flaglor Scooter is an unusual light aircraft designed in the United States in the mid-1960s and marketed for homebuilding.

== Design and development ==
The Scooter is a high-wing, wire-braced monoplane with the engine installed on the wing leading edge, above and in front of the pilot's seat. It features welded steel tube or wooden fuselage construction with fabric covering and short legged conventional landing gear. The wing uses wooden ribs and a dual spar construction with wire bracing. It was originally intended to be powered by a 18 hp (13 kW) Cushman golf buggy engine, but this was found to be inadequate and a Huggins Volkswagen automotive engine conversion was used to replace it.

== Operational history ==
Demonstrated at the 1967 EAA annual fly-in at Rockford, Illinois, the design won "Outstanding Ultralight" and "Outstanding Volkswagen-powered aircraft" awards. Plans were put on sale shortly thereafter.

== Specifications (Scooter) ==
Data from Air Trails

General characteristics

- Crew: 1 pilot
- Length: 15 ft 8 in (4.78 m)
- Wingspan: 28 ft 0 in (8.64 m)
- Height: 7 ft 0 in (2.13 m)
- Wing area: 115 sq ft (10.7 m^{2})
- Empty weight: 390 lb (180 kg)
- Gross weight: 650 lb (300 kg)
- Powerplant: 1 × Volkswagen automotive engine , 40 hp (30 kW)

Performance

- Maximum speed: 90 mph (145 km/h, 78 kn)
- Range: 175 mi (282 km, 152 nmi)
- Rate of climb: 600 ft/min (3.0 m/s)

== See also ==
Related development

- Ace Scooter
