= Acro Sport II =

Homebuilt aerobatic biplane

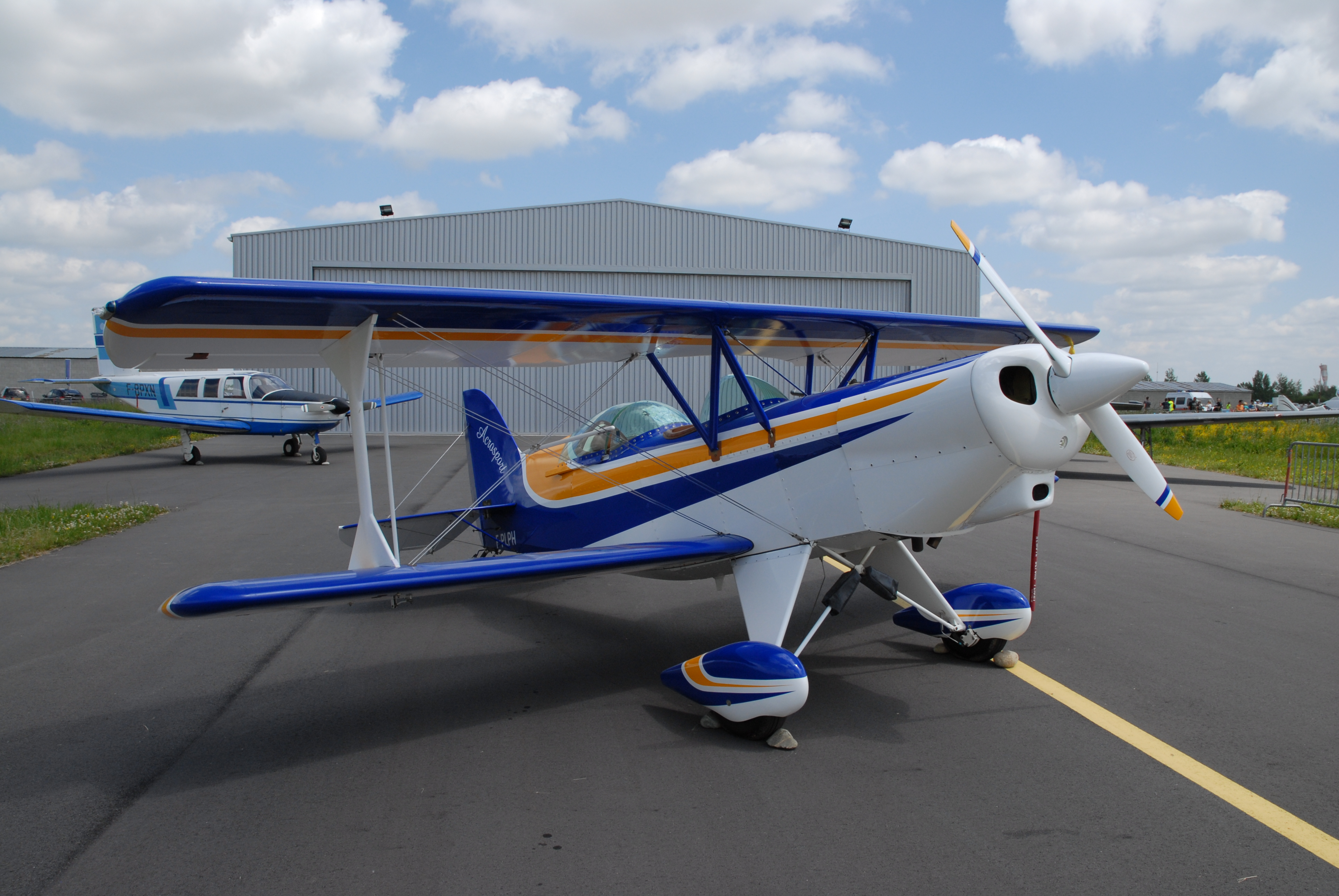

General information
- Type: Aerobatic homebuilt aircraft
- National origin: US
- Manufacturer: Acro Sport
- Designer: Paul Poberezny

History
- Developed from: Acro Sport I

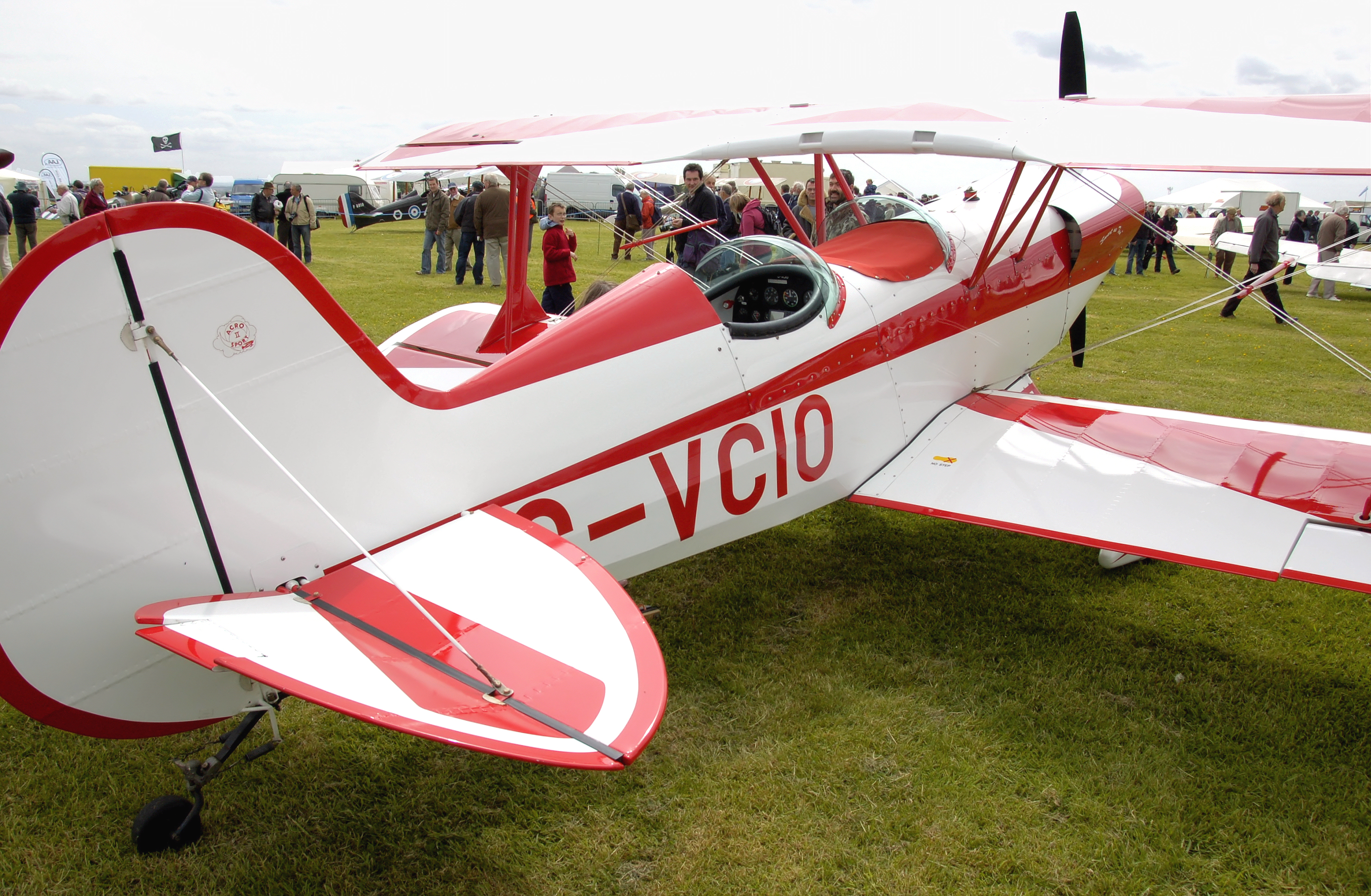
Acro Sport II

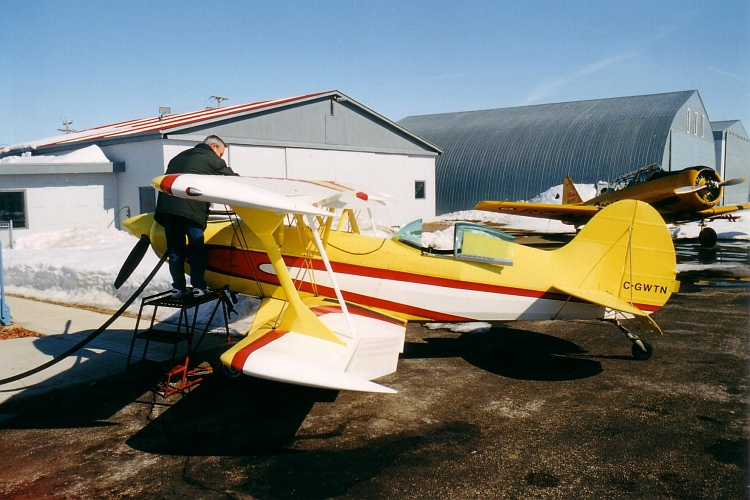
Acro Sport II

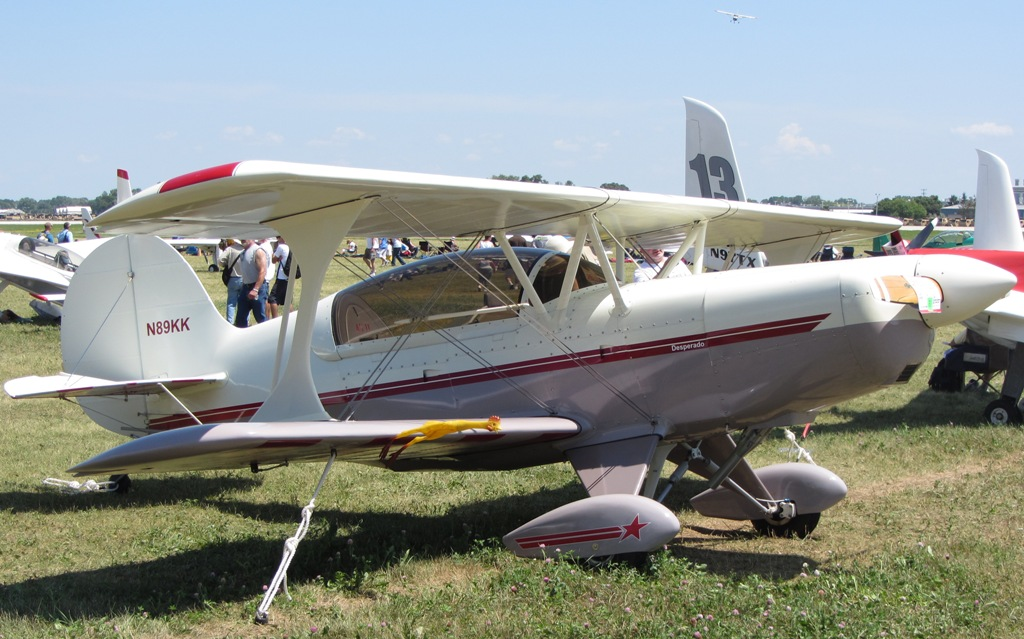
Acro Sport II

The Acro II is a two-seat aerobatic sportsplane designed by US aviation enthusiast Paul Poberezny in the 1970s for amateur construction. It is an enlarged version of his previous Acro Sport I, sized up to carry two persons. Plans are available through Acro Sport in Wisconsin and material kits are supplied by Aircraft Spruce and Specialty.

== Design and development ==
The Acro Sport II is a short-span biplane of conventional taildragger configuration, typically built with open cockpits and spatted main undercarriage. Its structure is fabric-covered, steel tube fuselage and tail group, with wood wing structure.

== Operational history ==
In March 2017, 83 examples were on the Federal Aviation Administration aircraft registry in the United States, although 129 had at one time been registered. In Canada in March 2017 there were 11 registered with Transport Canada.

== Variants ==
Acro Sport I
Single place version of the Acro Sport

== Specifications ==
Data from Terpstra

General characteristics

- Crew: one
- Capacity: one passenger
- Length: 18 ft 10.25 in (5.75 m)
- Wingspan: 21 ft 8 in (6.60 m)
- Height: 6 ft 7.75 in (2.03 m)
- Wing area: 152 sq ft (14.12 m^{2})
- Empty weight: 875 lb (397 kg)
- Gross weight: 1,520 lb (690 kg)
- Powerplant: 1 × Lycoming O-360 4-cylinder, air-cooled, horizontally-opposed piston aircraft engine, 180 hp (134 kW)

Performance

- Maximum speed: 152 mph (245 km/h, 132 kn)
- Cruise speed: 123 mph (198 km/h, 107 kn)
- Stall speed: 53 mph (85 km/h, 46 kn)
- Range: 430 mi (692 km, 370 nmi)
- Service ceiling: 20,000 ft (6,096 m)
- Rate of climb: 1,200 ft/min (6.0 m/s)
- Wing loading: 10.0 lb/sq ft (49 kg/m^{2})

== See also ==
Aircraft of comparable role, configuration, and era

- Pitts Special
- Sorrell Hiperbipe
- Steen Skybolt
- Stolp Starduster Too
- Aviat Eagle II (Christen Eagle)
