= Pober Pixie =

Pixie
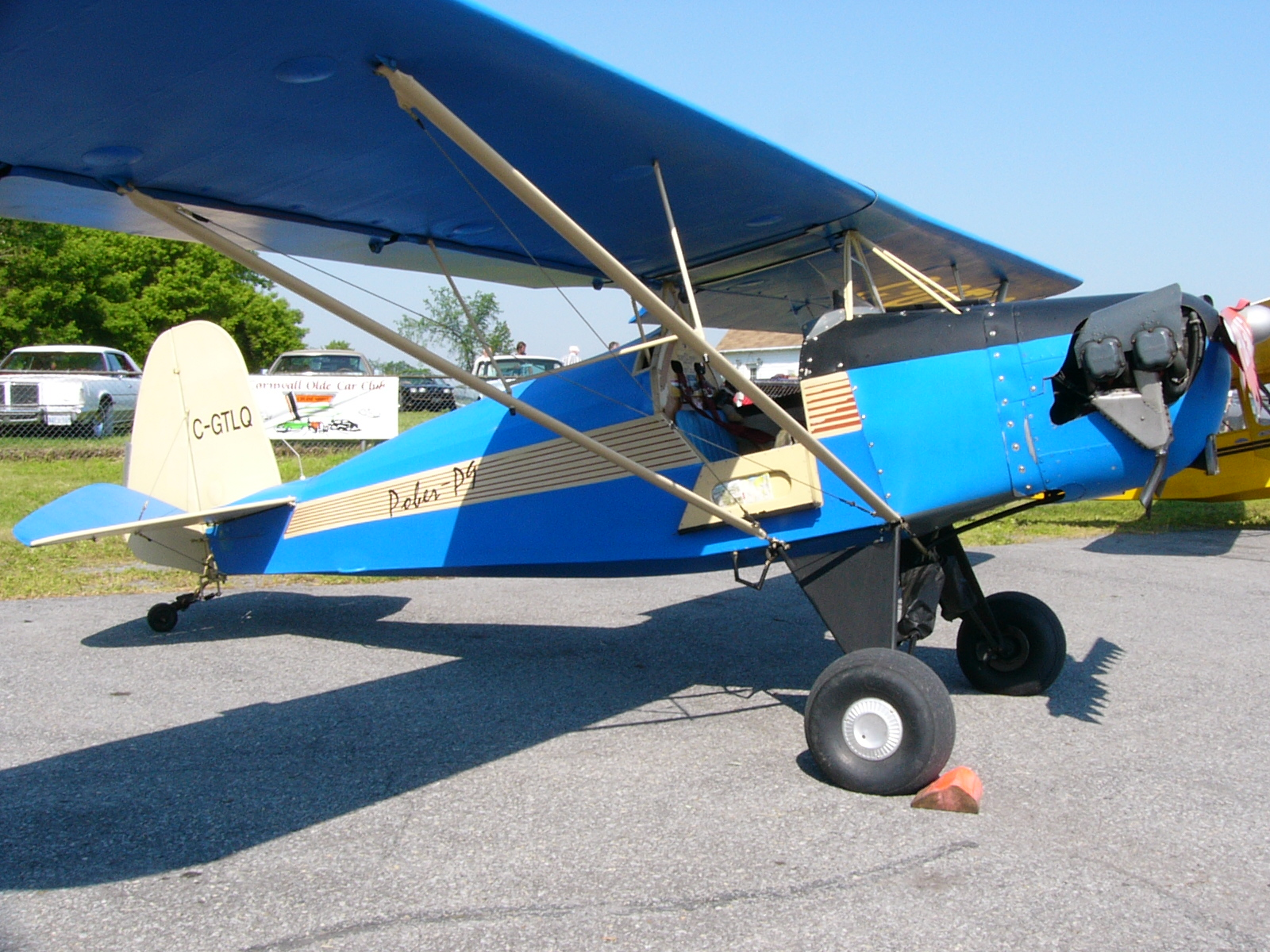
- Pober P9 Pixie built in 1980, seen in 2006

General information
- Type: Recreational aircraft
- Manufacturer: Acro Sport (plans)
- Designer: Paul Poberezny

History
- First flight: July 1974

The Pober Pixie is a single-seat light aircraft that was designed in the United States in 1974 and marketed as plans for homebuilding.

It is a conventional parasol-wing monoplane with fixed tailwheel undercarriage and a single open cockpit. The design was inspired by the Heath Parasol.

== Development ==
In response to the 1973 oil crisis, the EAA launched "Project Econoplane" to develop an aircraft with high fuel economy that would therefore be affordable for its members to operate. The Pober Pixie was the result, with a Volkswagen air-cooled engine of 1835 cc and a fuel consumption of 3 to 3.5 US Gal (11 to 13 L) per hour. Plans were completed in January 1974 and the prototype flew in late July, in time for the EAA Annual Convention that year.

After the convention, the prototype was returned to the workshop for modifications, including installation of a 60 hp (45 kW) Limbach SL 1700 EA engine and Rehm 5330 two-blade fixed-pitch propeller, details of which were incorporated into the plans.

== Design ==
The Pixie fuselage is fabricated from welded 4130 steel tube, while the wings are made from Sitka spruce covered with Stits Poly-fiber fabric. Recommended engines include Volkswagen or the Continental A65.

The design includes full-span ailerons that give it a high roll rate with minimal adverse yaw.

Aircraft Spruce and Specialty says of the design:

Similar in many respects to the Heath Parasol, the Pixie is a modernization of the helmet-and-goggle days of the 1930s. The large wing and full-span ailerons make for easy flying. With minimal taildragger experience, the Pixie is a breeze to handle on the ground. Landings are gentle affairs, visibility in cruise is outstanding and using it with skis adds another dimension of fun.

== Operational history ==
By March 2017, 27 examples had been registered in the United States with the Federal Aviation Administration and six with Transport Canada.

== Variants ==
Pober Pixie II
Paul Poberezny developed some drawings and started design and partial welding of a fuselage for a two-seat model. Michael Hoye of Heath Texas purchased the project in 1989, continued the design, and over a period of ten years completed building a single scratch built example of a tandem two-seat Pixie in 2000. This aircraft won an "outstanding workmanship" award at Airventure 2001 and was featured as the cover story by noted author Budd Davisson in the January 2002 issue of Sport Aviation magazine.

== Specifications (typical Pixie) ==
General characteristics

- Crew: one pilot
- Length: 17 ft 3 in (5.26 m)
- Wingspan: 29 ft 10 in (9.09 m)
- Height: 6 ft 2 in (1.88 m)
- Wing area: 134 sq ft (12.45 m^{2})
- Empty weight: 543 lb (246 kg)
- Gross weight: 900 lb (408 kg)
- Powerplant: 1 × converted Volkswagen air-cooled engine or Limbach SL 1700 EA , 60 hp (45 kW)

Performance

- Maximum speed: 130 mph (209 km/h, 110 kn)
- Cruise speed: 83 mph (134 km/h, 72 kn)
- Range: 290 mi (467 km, 250 nmi)
- Service ceiling: 12,500 ft (3,810 m)
- Rate of climb: 500 ft/min (2.54 m/s)
