= Pober Super Ace =

Single-seat sports aircraft designed as a homebuilt aircraft by Orland Corben in 1935

General information
- Type: sports aircraft
- National origin: US
- Manufacturer: Acro Sport
- Designer: Orland Corben

The Pober Super Ace was a single-seat sports aircraft designed as a homebuilt aircraft by Orland Corben in 1935. Originally the "Corben Super Ace," it was an evolution of the Corben Baby Ace, and closely linked with it throughout their existence.

It was a single-seat parasol wing monoplane of conventional tailwheel configuration. As published, the plans called for an engine from a Ford Model A (some say Ford Model B) to be modified to power the aircraft.

A set of plans and construction articles appeared in Popular Aviation between April and October 1935 and were later marketed by Orland Corben.

Rights to the aircraft were sold to Paul Poberezny with the rest of the Corben company's assets. Plans are currently offered for sale by Acro Sport.

== Variants ==
Baby Ace
Single-seat
Super Ace
Single-seat powered by a Ford Model A Automotive engine. Plans updated by EAA founder Paul Poberezny.
Jr. Ace
Two-seat tandem variant.
Pober Jr Ace
Updated plans of the Jr. Ace model

== Specifications ==
Data from

General characteristics

- Crew: one
- Length: 18 ft 6 in (5.64 m)
- Wingspan: 27 ft 3.5 in (8.32 m)
- Height: 6 ft 6 in (1.98 m)
- Wing area: 118 sq ft (10.96 m^{2})
- Empty weight: 685 lb (311 kg)
- Gross weight: 1,030 lb (467 kg)
- Powerplant: 1 × Continental , 85 hp (63 kW)

Performance

- Maximum speed: 110 mph (177 km/h, 96 kn)
- Cruise speed: 90 mph (145 km/h, 78 kn)
- Range: 250 mi (403 km, 220 nmi)
- Service ceiling: 15,000 ft (4,572 m)
- Rate of climb: 800 ft/min (4.0 m/s)
