= Paul Poberezny =

United States aviator, founder of Experimental Aircraft Association

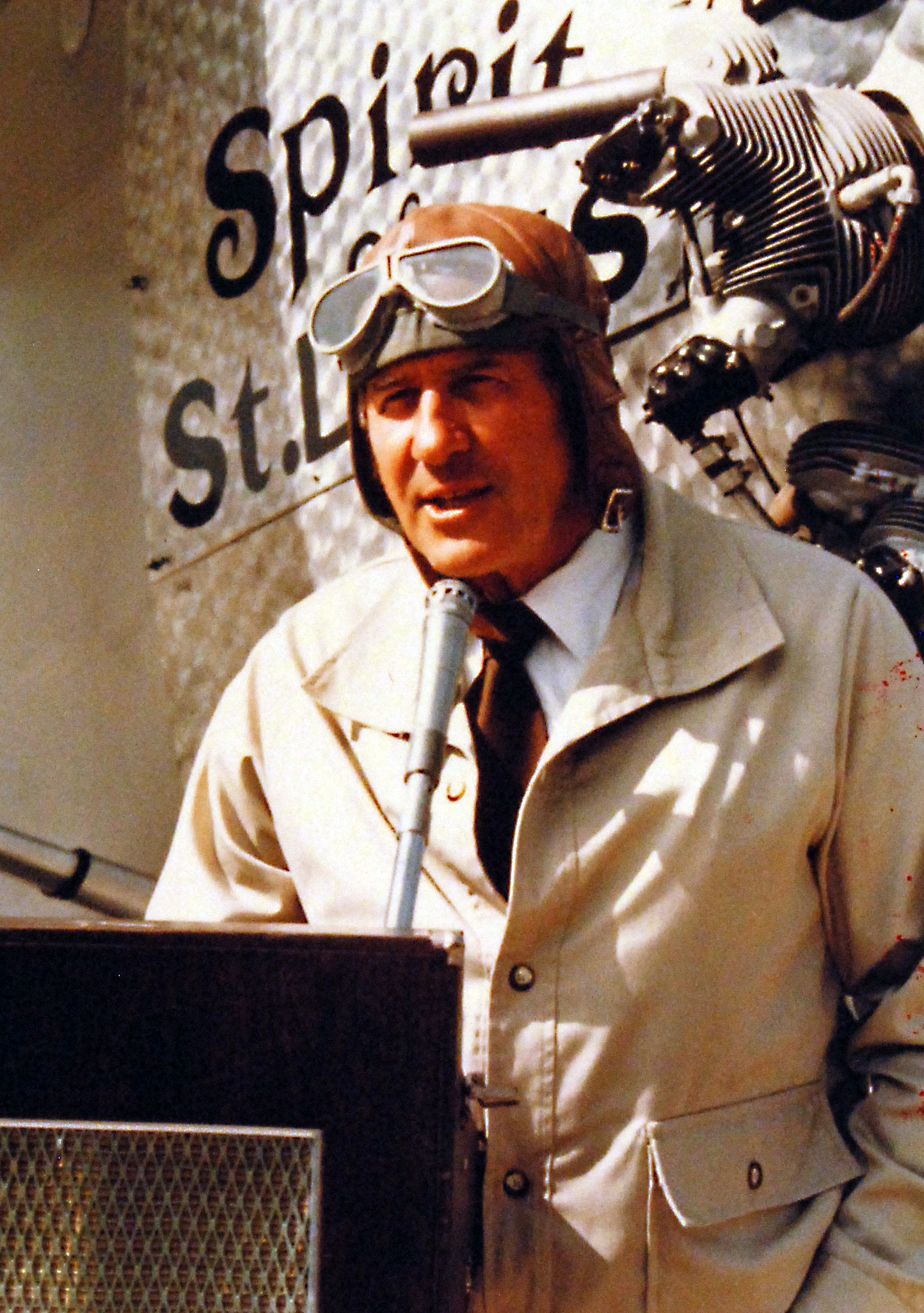
- Poberezny dressed as Charles Lindbergh following his test-flight of EAA's Spirit of St. Louis replica on the 50th anniversary of its transatlantic flight, 1977
- Born: September 14, 1921; Leavenworth County, Kansas, US
- Died: August 22, 2013 (aged 91); Oshkosh, Wisconsin, US
- Resting place: Oshkosh, Wisconsin
- Education: High school
- Occupations: Military aviator, aviation entrepreneur, aircraft designer
- Known for: Founder of the Experimental Aircraft Association (EAA) and AirVenture, pioneer of aircraft amateur-building and grassroots aviation
- Spouse: Audrey Poberezny
- Children: Tom Poberezny; Bonnie Poberezny
- Parent(s): Peter Poberezny; Jettie Dowdy
- Awards: See below

Paul Howard Poberezny (September 14, 1921 – August 22, 2013) was an American aviator, entrepreneur, and aircraft designer. He founded the Experimental Aircraft Association (EAA) in 1953, and spent the greater part of his life promoting homebuilt aircraft.

Poberezny is widely considered as the first person to have popularized the tradition of aircraft homebuilding in the United States. Through his work founding EAA and the organization's annual convention in Oshkosh, Wisconsin, he had the reputation of helping inspire millions of people to get involved in grassroots aviation. Many attribute his legacy with the growth and sustainment of the US general aviation industry in the later part of the 20th century and into the early 21st. For the last two decades of his tenure as chairman of the EAA from 1989–2009, he worked closely with his son, aerobatic pilot and EAA president Tom Poberezny, to expand the organization and create several new programs within it, including an aviation education program for youth and the EAA Museum, among other initiatives.

In addition to his longtime experience as a military aviator (earning all seven types of pilot wings offered by the armed services), Poberezny was also an instructor, air show, air race and test pilot who frequently test flew his own homebuilt designs as well as various aircraft built by the EAA, such as the EAA Biplane. He flew for more than 70 years of his life in over 500 different types of aircraft, and was inducted into the National Aviation Hall of Fame in 1999. He also received the Wright Brothers Memorial Trophy in 2002 and was ranked fourth on Flying's list of the 51 Heroes of Aviation, the highest-ranked living person on the list at the time of its release. Poberezny died of cancer in 2013, at the age of 91.

== Early life ==
Paul Poberezny was the oldest of three children born to Peter Poberezny, a Ukrainian migrant born and raised in Terebovlia, and Jettie Dowdy, who hailed from the southern United States. Born in Leavenworth County, Kansas, Paul grew up poor in a tar paper shack in Milwaukee, Wisconsin and never experienced indoor plumbing until he went to school. He became interested in aviation at an early age and built model airplanes as his first educational experience into aircraft design. He then learned how to fly and repair aircraft in high school, starting with a WACO Primary Glider and Porterfield 35 monoplane, and followed by an American Eagle biplane after high school. Having never attended college, Poberezny once described learning to fly and maintain the Eagle as the closest thing he ever had to a college education experience.

== Experimental Aircraft Association ==
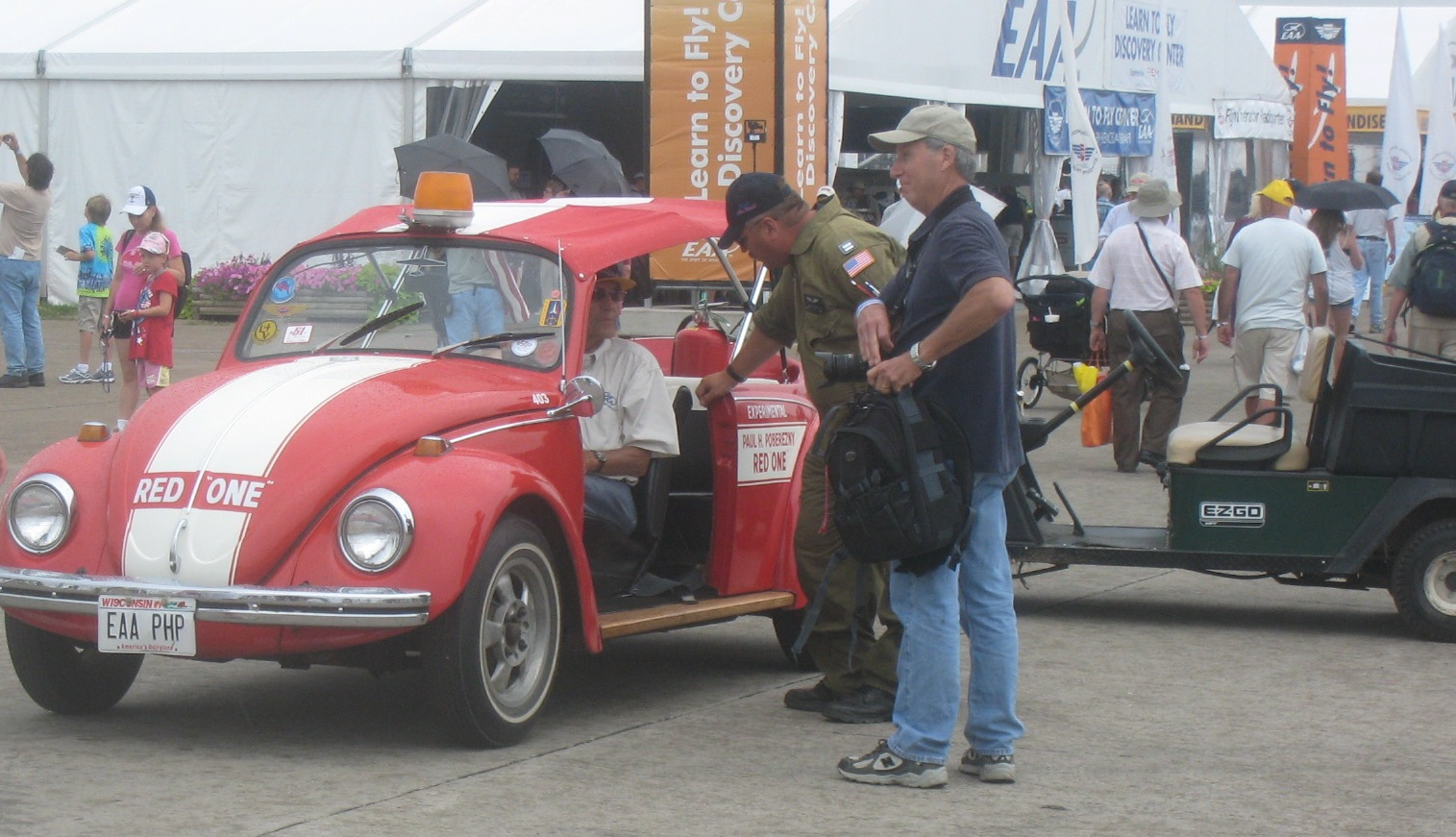
Poberezny driving "Red One" at EAA AirVenture Oshkosh 2010

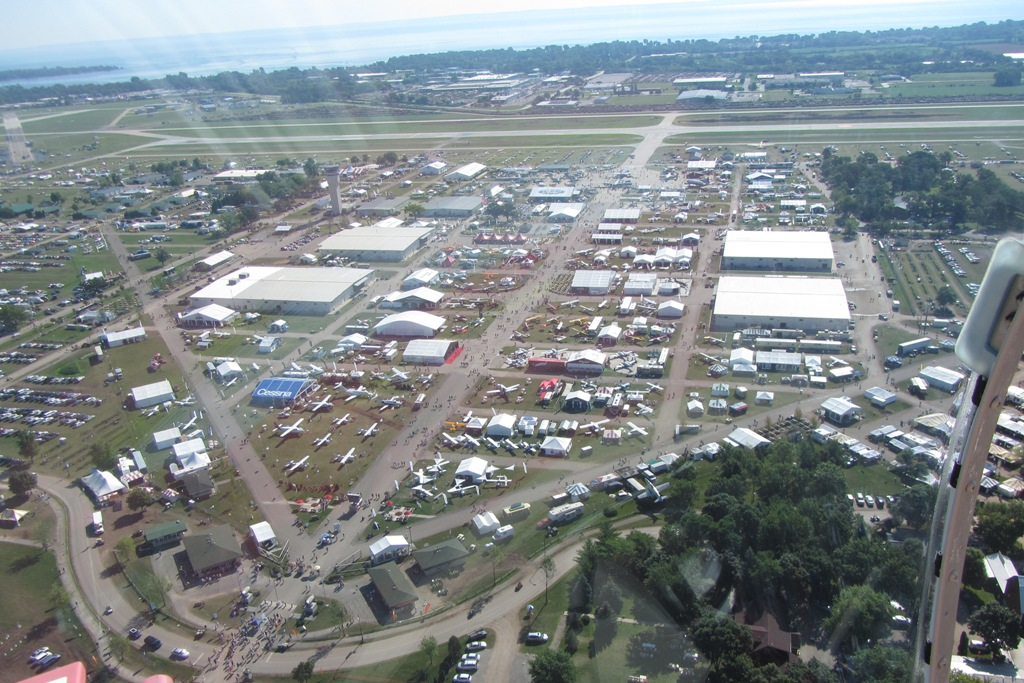
Grounds of AirVenture 2011

Poberezny founded the Experimental Aircraft Association out of his Hales Corners, Wisconsin home in 1953. It started as predominately an aircraft homebuilding organization in his basement, but later went on to capture all aspects of general aviation internationally. Poberezny retired as EAA President in 1989, remaining as chairman of the organization until 2009. As of 2017, the organization had approximately 200,000 members in more than 100 countries.

In 1953, the EAA released a two-page newsletter named The Experimenter (later renamed Sport Aviation). The newsletter was first published and written by Paul and his wife Audrey Poberezny along with other volunteers. The now-monthly magazine focuses on experimental homebuilding and other general aviation topics, including antique, war, and classic aircraft.

EAA's annual convention and fly-in (now known as EAA AirVenture Oshkosh) in Oshkosh, Wisconsin attracts a total attendance in excess of 600,000 people, 10,000 aircraft, and 1,000 different forums & workshops annually, making it the largest of its kind in the world. It was first held in 1953 at what is now Timmerman Field in Milwaukee, and attracted only a handful of airplanes. Towards the late '50s, the event outgrew Timmerman Field and was moved to the Rockford, Illinois Municipal Airport (now Chicago Rockford International Airport). There, attendance at the fly-in continued to grow until the Rockford airport was too small to accommodate the crowds, and so it was moved to Oshkosh's Wittman Regional Airport in 1970.

Paul's son, aerobatic world champion Tom Poberezny, was the chairman of the annual EAA AirVenture Convention from 1977 to August 2011, and was president of EAA from 1989 to September 2010. In March 2009, Paul stepped down as Chairman of EAA and his son took on these duties as well. Tom had a large impact on the expansive growth of the organization and convention over the more than two decades that he led them with his father.

The EAA spawned the creation of numerous aviation programs and activities within the organization, including a technical counselor program, flight advisor program, youth introduction-to-aviation program (the Young Eagles), National Cadet Special Activity program as part of the Civil Air Patrol (National Blue Beret), and more. In addition, AirVenture has nearly a $200 million annual economic impact on the surrounding region of Wisconsin and inspired the formation of other similar events such as Tannkosh in Germany and Sun 'n Fun in Florida, as well as similar organizations such as the Aircraft Kit Industry Association founded by pioneer homebuilder Richard VanGrunsven.

== Military career ==
Poberezny served for 30 years in the Wisconsin Air National Guard and United States Air Force, including active duty during World War II and the Korean War. He retired with the rank of lieutenant colonel, and attained all seven aviation wings offered by the military: glider pilot, service pilot, rated pilot, liaison pilot, senior pilot, Army aviator, and command pilot.

== Aircraft experience ==
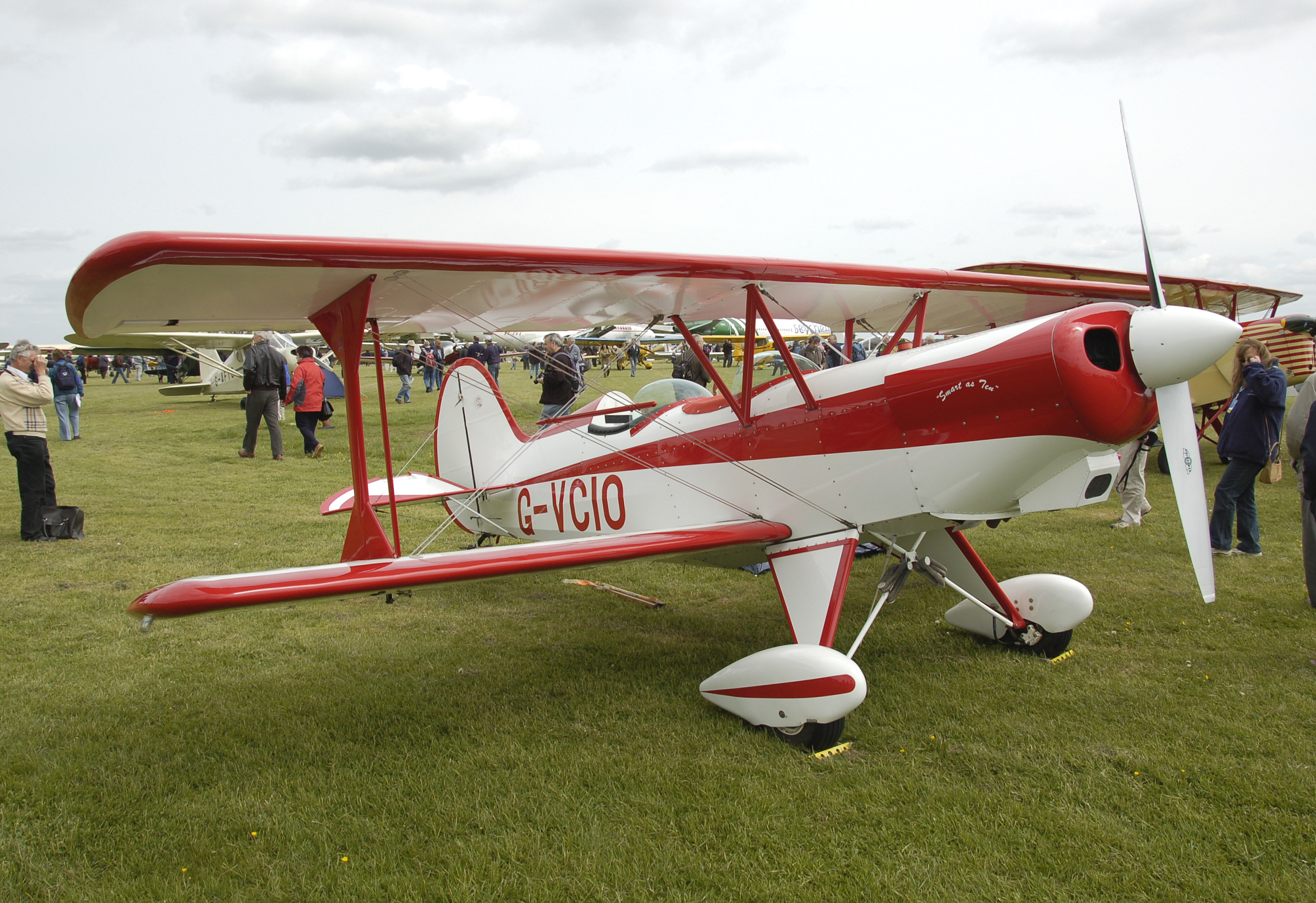
The Acro Sport II home-built biplane, designed by Paul Poberezny

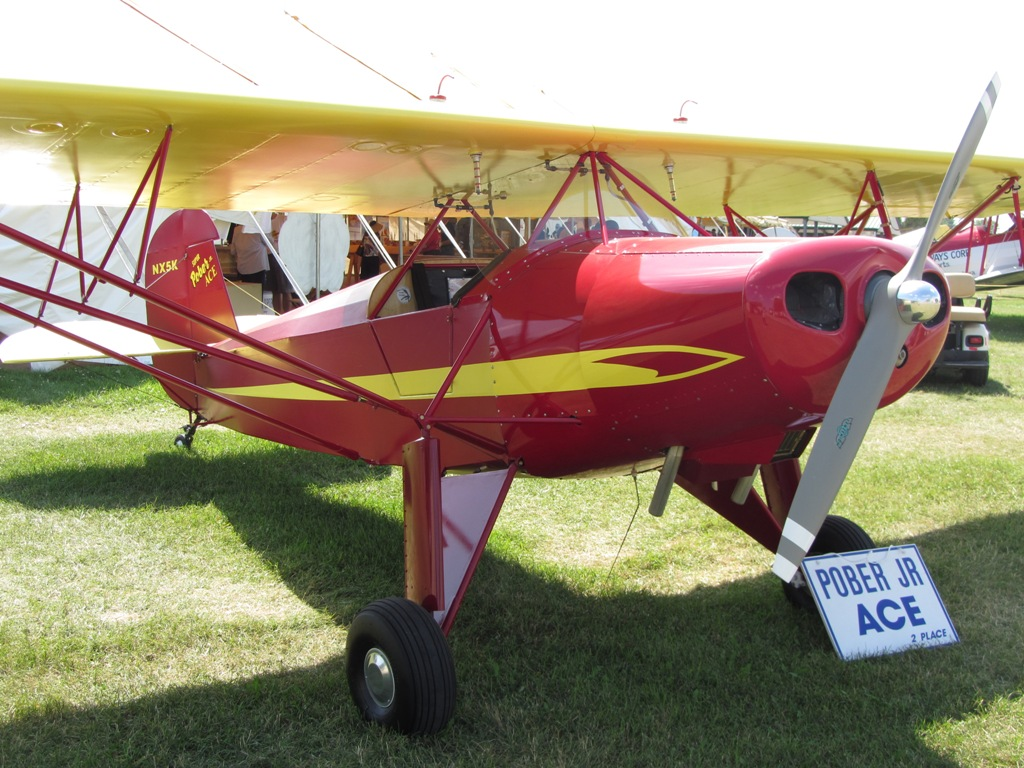
The Pober Jr Ace

Poberezny flew over 500 aircraft types, including over 170 home-built planes throughout his life. He was introduced to aviation in 1936 at the age of 16 with the gift of a donated damaged WACO Primary Glider that he rebuilt and taught himself to fly. A high school teacher owned the glider and offered to pay Poberezny to repair it. He hauled it to his father's garage, borrowed books on building/repairing airplanes, and completed the restoration soon after. A friend used his car to tow the glider into the air with Poberezny at the controls; it rose to around a hundred feet when he released the tow rope and coasted to a gentle landing in a bed of alfalfa. A year later, Poberezny soloed at age 17 in a 1935 Porterfield and soon co-owned an American Eagle biplane.

After returning home from World War II, Poberezny could not afford to buy his own aircraft, so he decided to build one himself. In 1955, he wrote a series of articles for the publication Mechanix Illustrated, where he described how an individual could buy a set of plans and build an airplane at home. In the magazine were also photos of himself fabricating the Baby Ace, an amateur-built aircraft (and the first to be marketed as a "homebuilt") that he bought the rights to for US$200 a few years prior. The articles became extremely popular and gave the concept of homebuilding worldwide acclaim.

He designed, modified, and built several home-built aircraft, and had more than 30,000 hours of flight time in his career. Aircraft that he designed and built include:

- Acro Sport I & II
- "Little Audrey"
- Poberezny P-5 Pober Sport
- Pober Jr Ace
- Pober Pixie
- Pober Super Ace

Poberezny made the first test flight of the EAA Biplane example Parkside Eagle in 1971, which was constructed by students of Parkside High School in Michigan.

His 1944 North American F-51D Mustang, dubbed Paul I, which he flew at air shows and air races from 1977–2003, is on display at the EAA Aviation Museum in Oshkosh.

== Personal life and death ==
In 1996, Poberezny teamed with his daughter Bonnie, her husband Chuck Parnall, and Bill Blake to write Poberezny: The Story Begins, a recounting of the early years of Paul and Audrey, including the founding of EAA. Paul Poberezny died of cancer on August 22, 2013, in Oshkosh, Wisconsin, at age 91. His estate in Oshkosh is preserved by Aircraft Spruce & Specialty Co. and was opened to public tours beginning in the summer of 2017. Audrey Poberezny died on November 1, 2020, at age 95, and Tom Poberezny died on July 25, 2022, at age 75, severing the last direct link between EAA and the Poberezny family that founded it.

== Awards and legacy ==
External videos
- Paul Poberezny retrospective from the Junior Achievement U.S. Business Hall of Fame in 2005

In 1971 Poberezny was the first recipient of the Duane and Judy Cole Award, presented to individuals that promote sport aviation. In 1978 he was named an honorary fellow of the Society of Experimental Test Pilots, in 1986 he was inducted into the Wisconsin Aviation Hall of Fame, and in 1987, the National Aeronautic Association (NAA) awarded him the Elder Statesman of Aviation. In 1997 he was inducted into the International Air & Space Hall of Fame and in 1999, the National Aviation Hall of Fame in Dayton, Ohio. He received the NBAA's 2001 Award for Meritorious Service to Aviation and the 2002 Wright Brothers Memorial Trophy. In 2008 the Wisconsin Historical Society named him as a "Wisconsin History Maker", recognizing his unique contributions to the state's history. Flying Magazine ranked Poberezny at number 4 on their 2013 list of the 51 Heroes of Aviation, putting him ahead of figures like Bob Hoover, Amelia Earhart, Jimmy Doolittle, and even Chuck Yeager. At the time of its release, just one month before his death, Poberezny was the highest-ranked living person on the list.

Many prominent aviation figures have praised Poberezny's legacy as being crucial to the maturation of the general aviation (GA) industry and to aviation advocacy at large. Radio newscaster and pilot Paul Harvey said that the Poberezny family "militantly manned the ramparts against those who would fence off the sky", and airshow pilot Julie Clark noted Poberezny as inspiring her and "countless thousands of others to get involved in the promotion of aviation." The Klapmeier brothers, fellow Wisconsinites who founded Cirrus Aircraft in the mid-1980s with a homebuilt design, also credited Poberezny and the EAA as essential to their success:

The EAA has [been] the driving force for preserving and fostering the enthusiasm of aviation. Without the enthusiasm and passion for this industry, we would not have seen the great development of GA through the 60s and 70s and, I believe, GA may not have even survived the late 80s and 90s. Paul created an organization that allowed, fostered and promoted creativity and perseverance for aviation. EAA allowed [Alan and me] to dream of something different, and then showed us a path forward for that dream.

— Dale Klapmeier

== See also ==
- One Six Right (2005 documentary)
- Project Schoolflight
- Timothy Prince
- Burt Rutan
- Steve Wittman
