= Acro Sport I =

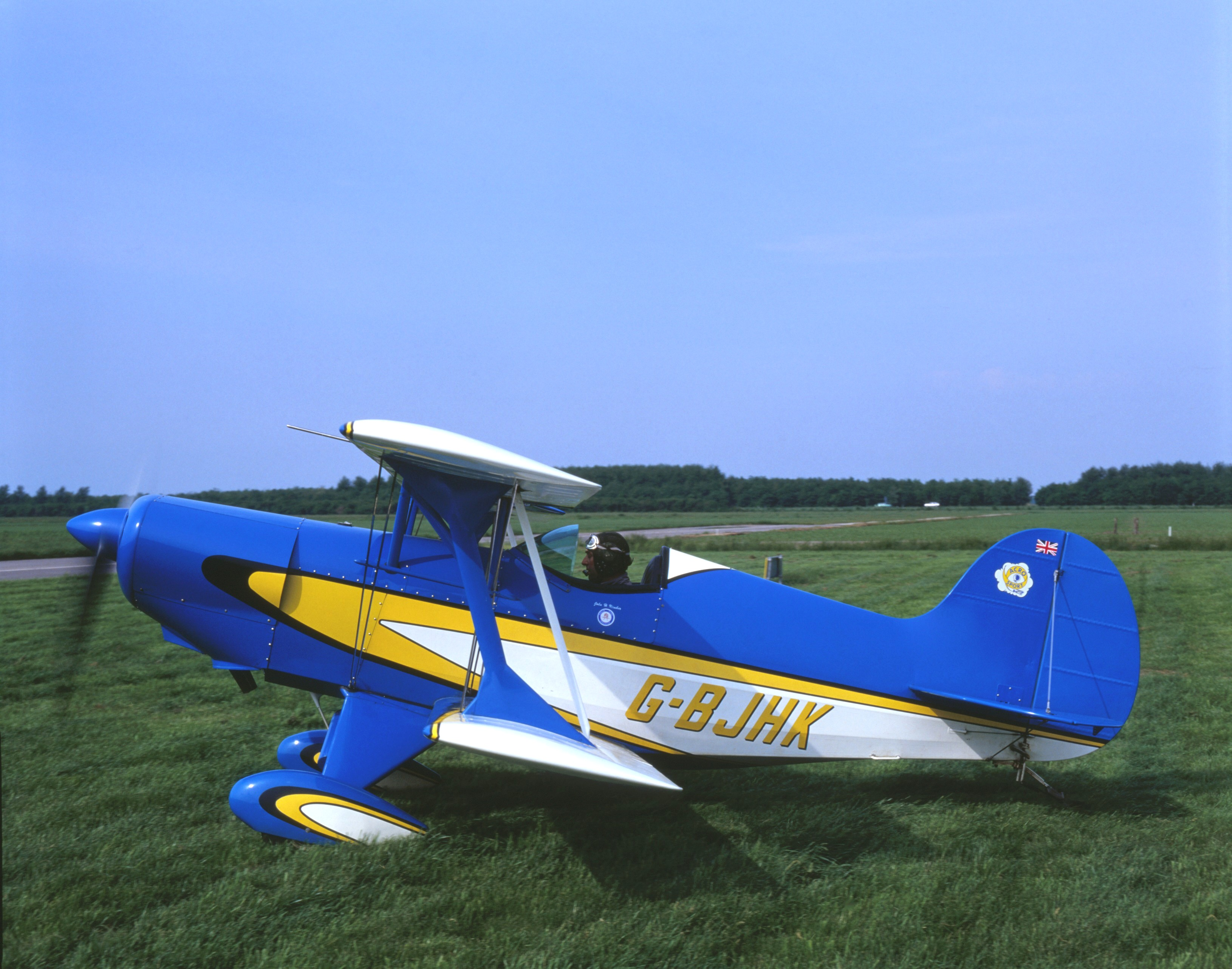

General information
- Type: aerobatic sportsplane
- National origin: US
- Manufacturer: Acro Sport
- Designer: Paul Poberezny

History
- First flight: 11 January 1972
- Variant: Acro Sport II

The Acro Sport is a single-seat aerobatic sportsplane designed by US aviation enthusiast Paul Poberezny in the early 1970s for homebuilding. Plans are marketed by Acro Sport Inc.

The Acro Sport is a short-span biplane of conventional taildragger configuration, typically built with an open cockpit and spatted main undercarriage. Its structure is a fabric-covered, steel tube fuselage and tail group, with a wood wing structure.

== Variants ==
The Acro Sport II is the two place version of the Acro Sport I

== Specifications ==
Data from

General characteristics

- Crew: one
- Length: 17 ft 6 in (5.33 m)
- Wingspan: 19 ft 7 in (5.97 m)
- Height: 6 ft 0 in (1.83 m)
- Wing area: 116 sq ft (10.78 m^{2})
- Empty weight: 900 lb (408 kg)
- Gross weight: 1,350 lb (612 kg)
- Powerplant: 1 × Lycoming O-360 4-cyl. air-cooled horizontally-opposed piston engine, 180 hp (135 kW)

Performance

- Maximum speed: 152 mph (245 km/h, 132 kn)
- Cruise speed: 130 mph (209 km/h, 110 kn)
- Stall speed: 50 mph (81 km/h, 43 kn)
- Range: 350 mi (564 km, 300 nmi)
- Service ceiling: 20,000 ft (6,096 m)
- Rate of climb: 3,500 ft/min (18 m/s)
