= Aviation in Wisconsin =

- Aviation in the United States
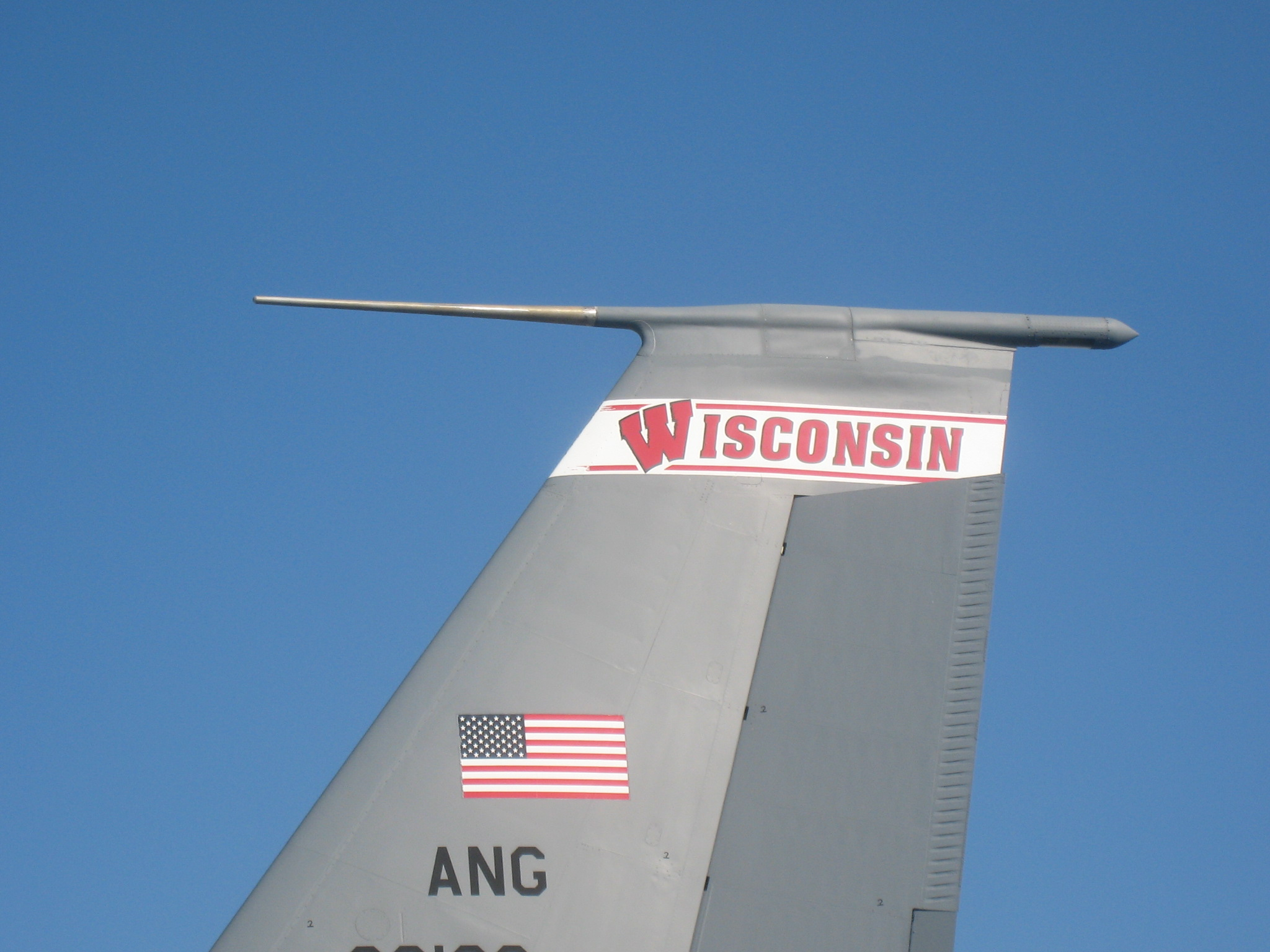

Airports
- Commercial – primary: 8
- Commercial – non-primary: 6
- General aviation: 74
- Other public-use airports: 45
- Military and other airports: 1

First flight
- November 2, 1909

Aviation in Wisconsin refers to the aviation industry of the American Midwestern state of Wisconsin.

Wisconsin's first aeronautical event was a flight of a Curtiss aircraft by Arthur Pratt Warner on November 2, 1909, in Beloit.

== Events ==
- 1953 - The Experimental Aircraft Association is founded in Hales Corners.
- 1962, September 6 - Korabl-Sputnik 4 re-enters and imbeds itself into a street in Manitowoc.
- 1970 - The Experimental Aircraft Association moves its airshow to Oshkosh. The airshow has grown to become the largest annual airshow in the United States.
- 1984 - Cirrus Aircraft is founded in a rural Baraboo barn.

== Aircraft Manufacturers ==
- American Champion, Rochester 1980–present, builds modern variations of the Aeronca Champion.
- Basler Turbo Conversions, Oshkosh 1957–present, manufactures Basler BT-67s by retrofitting Douglas DC-3 aircraft with Turboprop engines.
- Champion Aircraft, Osceola 1954−present, acquired by AviaBellanca Aircraft Corporation in 1970.
- DarkAero, Madison 2017−present, building a high-performance kit aircraft design.
- Hamilton Manufacturing Company, Milwaukee 1918–1929, maker of propellers.
- Hamilton Metalplane Company, Milwaukee − 1927, sold to Boeing, maker of the Hamilton Metalplane.
- Sonex Aircraft, Oshkosh 1998−present, produces homebuilt designs and kits. Manafacutres the Sonex series of lightweight aircraft.

== Aerospace ==
- DeltaHawk Engines, Inc. in Racine, Wisconsin, develops heavy fuel light aircraft engines.
- United Gear and Assembly Inc, is headquartered in Hudson. Producer of airspeed gauges.
- Velicon, Milwaukee-based, manufactures electric motors and generators for aerospace testing.

== Airports ==
- List of airports in Wisconsin

== Commercial Service ==
- Wisconsin has 8 airports which offer regular commercial airline service
- Air Wisconsin, 1965–present. Based in Greenville. Operates as a regional airline flying for American Airlines under the name American Eagle.
- Kohler Aviation, 1929–1934. Operated Loening C-2 amphibious aircraft between Milwaukee and Grand Rapids, Michigan.

== People ==
- Richard Bong, highest-scoring air ace during WWII, was born in Superior.
- Klapmeier brothers, founders of Cirrus Aircraft, started their careers in Baraboo.
- Billy Mitchell, a major general who is regarded as the father of the United States Air Force, grew up in West Allis.
- Paul Poberezny, founder of the EAA and the EAA AirVenture Oshkosh airshow, lived in Hales Corners and Oshkosh.
- Tom Poberezny, former aerobatic world champion and president of the EAA, lived in Hales Corners and Oshkosh.
- Robert Campbell Reeve, founder of Reeve Aleutian Airways, was born in Waunakee.
- Deke Slayton, USAF pilot and one of the original NASA Mercury Seven astronauts, was born in Sparta.

== Organizations ==
- Experimental Aircraft Association – is headquartered in Oshkosh.
- Wisconsin Aviation Hall of Fame.

== Government and Military ==
- All flight operations in Wisconsin are conducted within FAA oversight.
- The Wisconsin Department of Transportation manages taxes and state regulations for Wisconsin.
- The Wisconsin Air National Guard includes the 115th Fighter Wing, based out of Dane County Regional Airport.
- The Wisconsin State Patrol operates 4 Cessna 172 aircraft.
- The Law Enforcement Aviation Coalition, Inc. is a multi-state law enforcement equipment sharing service that has a Bell OH-58 Kiowa operating at a base in Kenosha

== Museums ==
- EAA Aviation Museum Oshkosh.
- Fortaleza Hall, Racine, Wisconsin. A Frank Lloyd Wright style building housing the SC Johnson Sikorsky S-38 The Spirit of Carnauba.
- Mitchell Gallery of Flight at the General Mitchell International Airport
- Richard I. Bong Veterans Historical Center in Superior, Wisconsin
- Aviation Heritage Center of Wisconsin in Sheboygan Falls

== Gallery ==
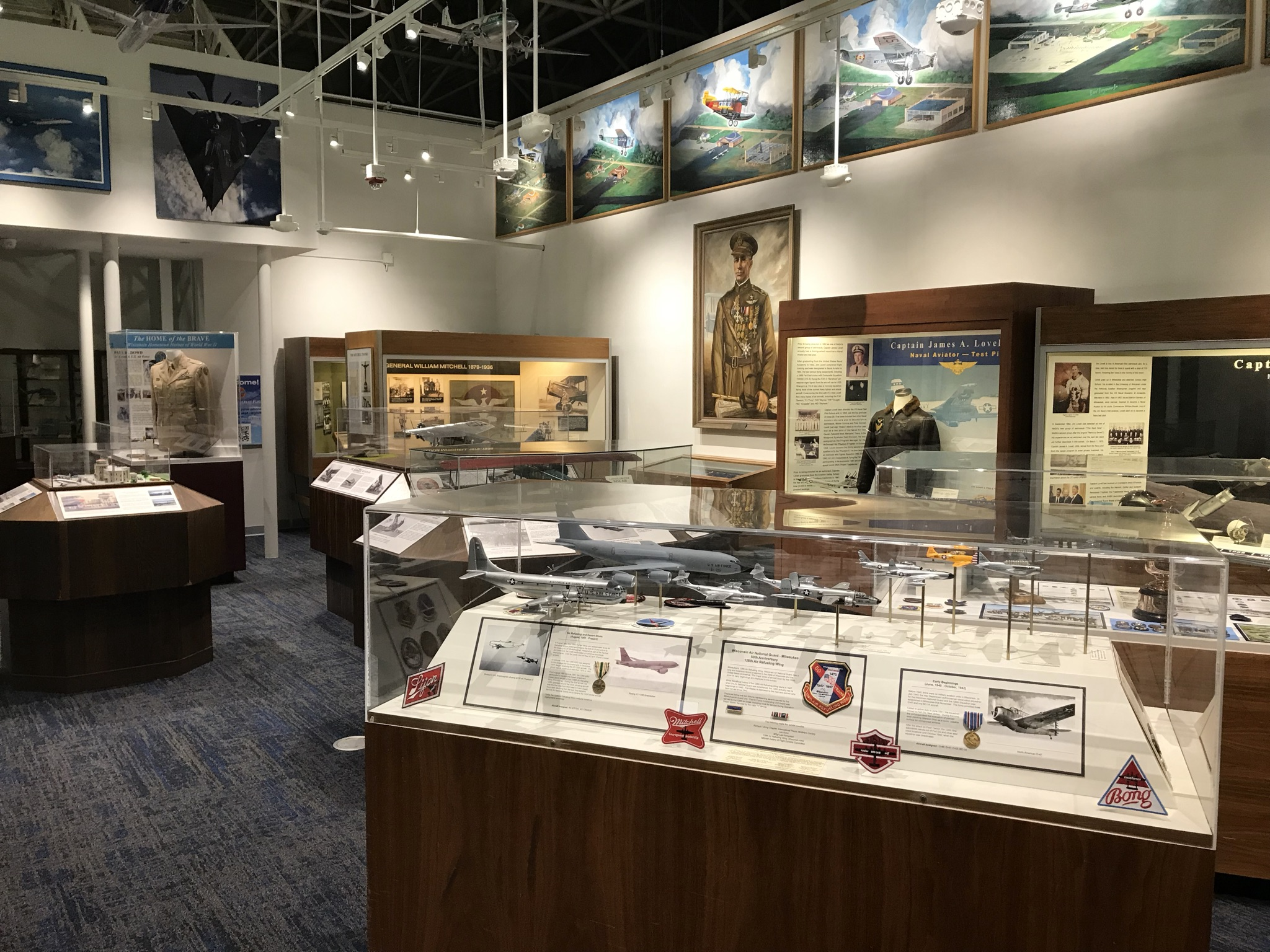
Mitchell Gallery of Flight

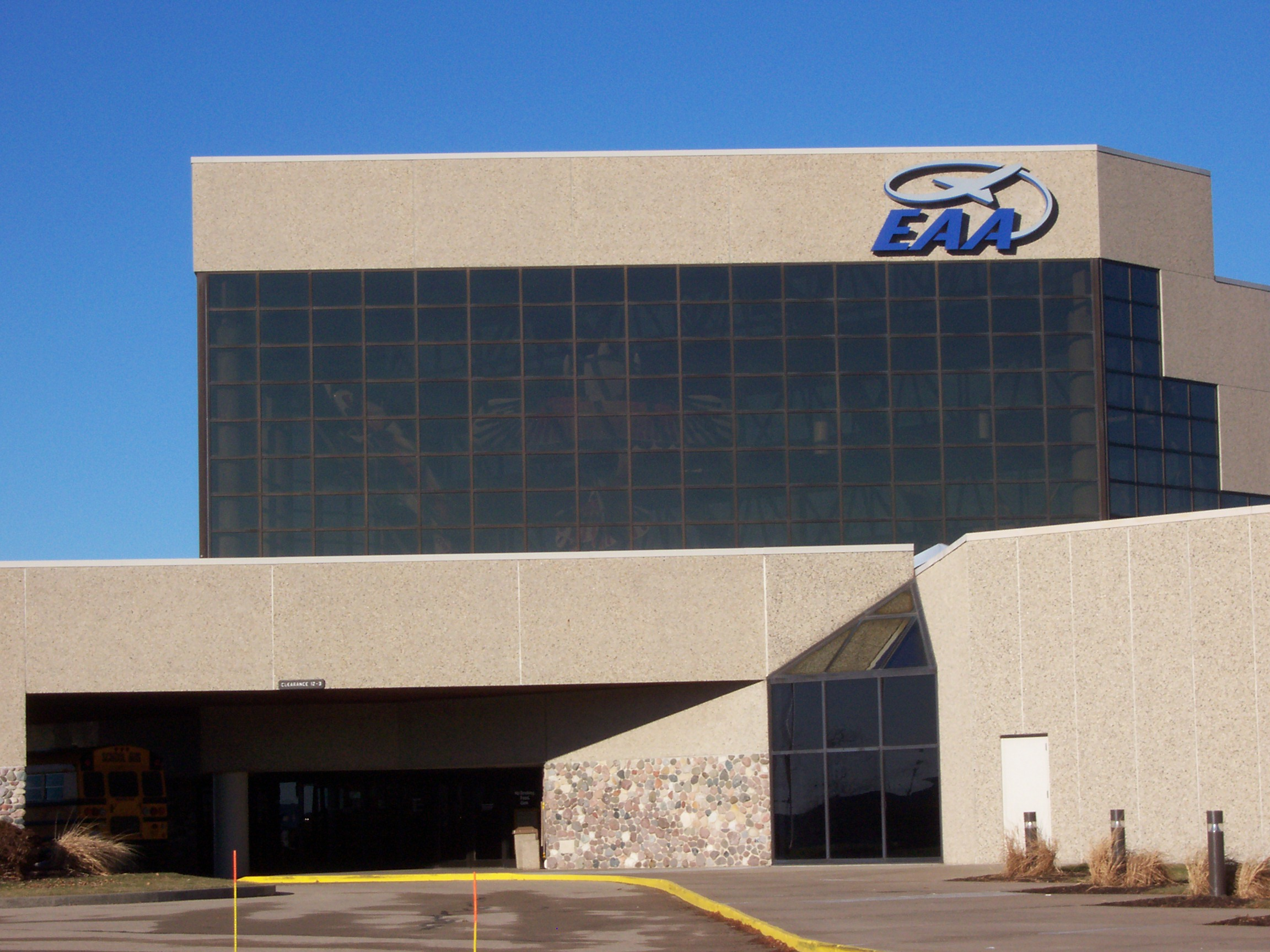
EAA museum and headquarters

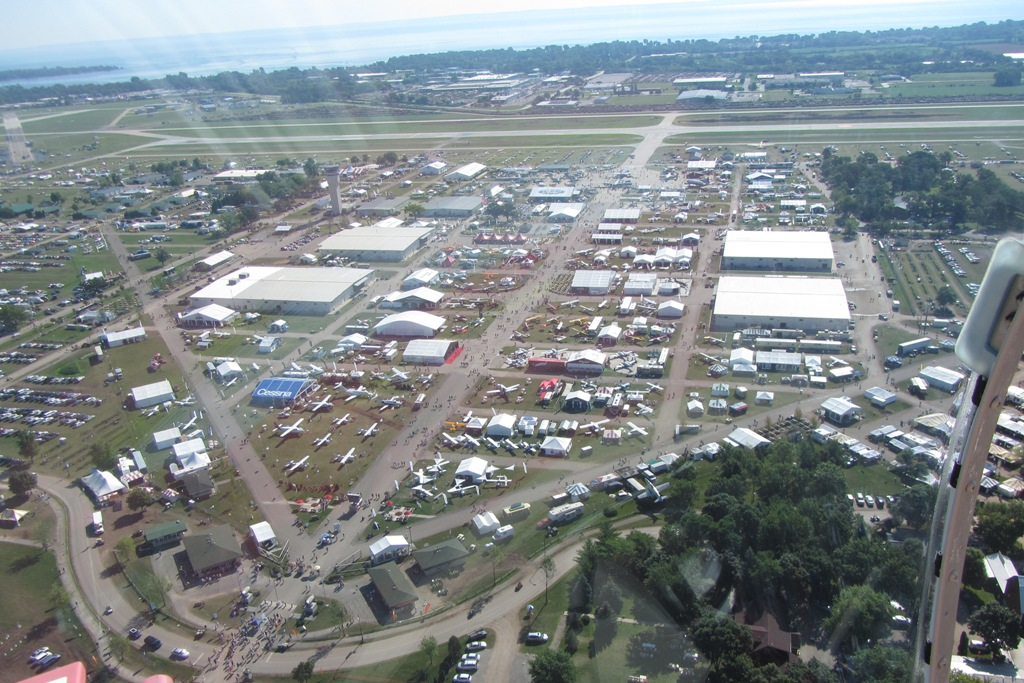
EAA airshow grounds from the air in 2011

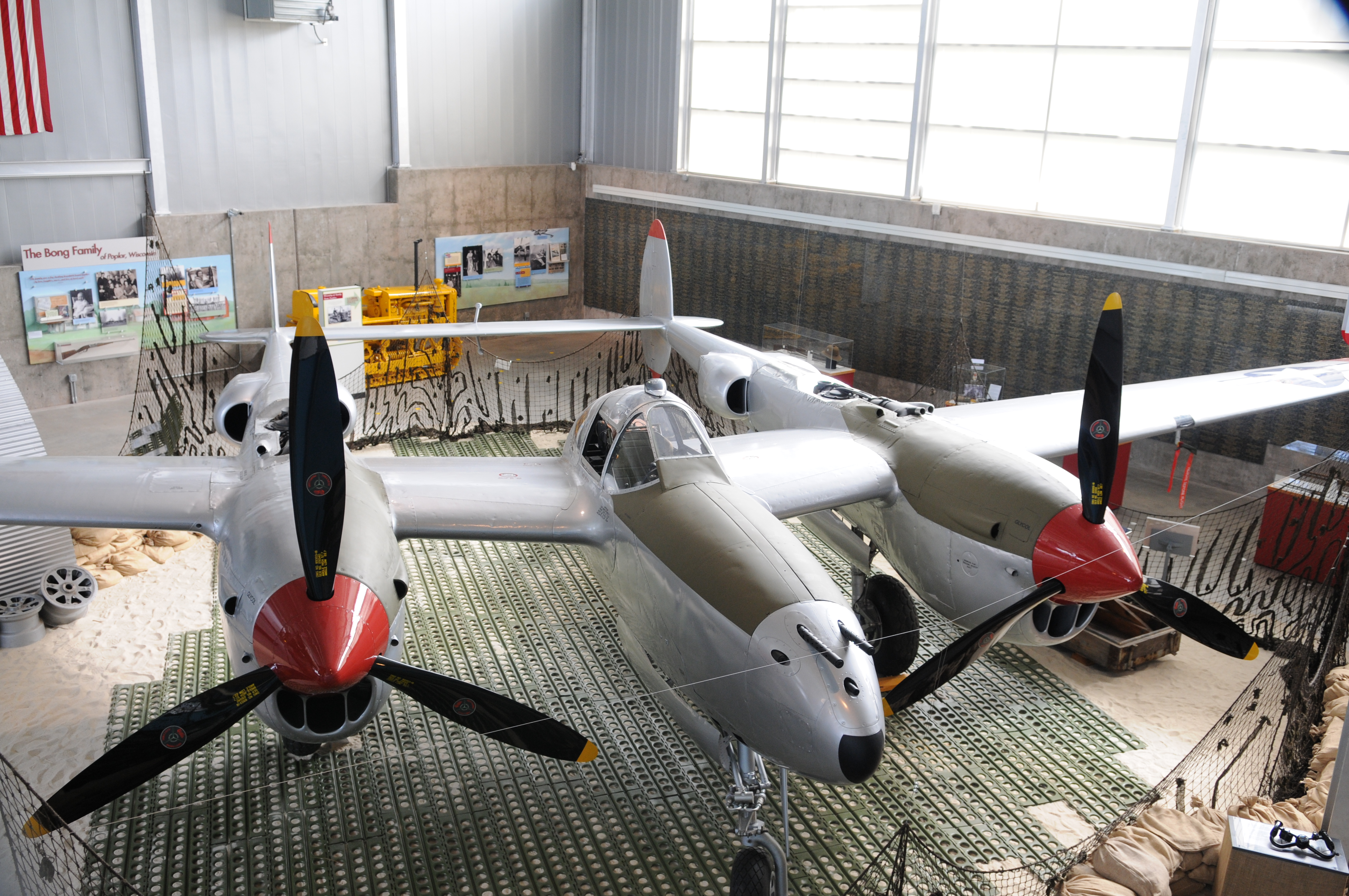
Richard I. Bong Veterans Historical Center
