= Aviat Eagle =

1970's American sporting biplane

Eagle
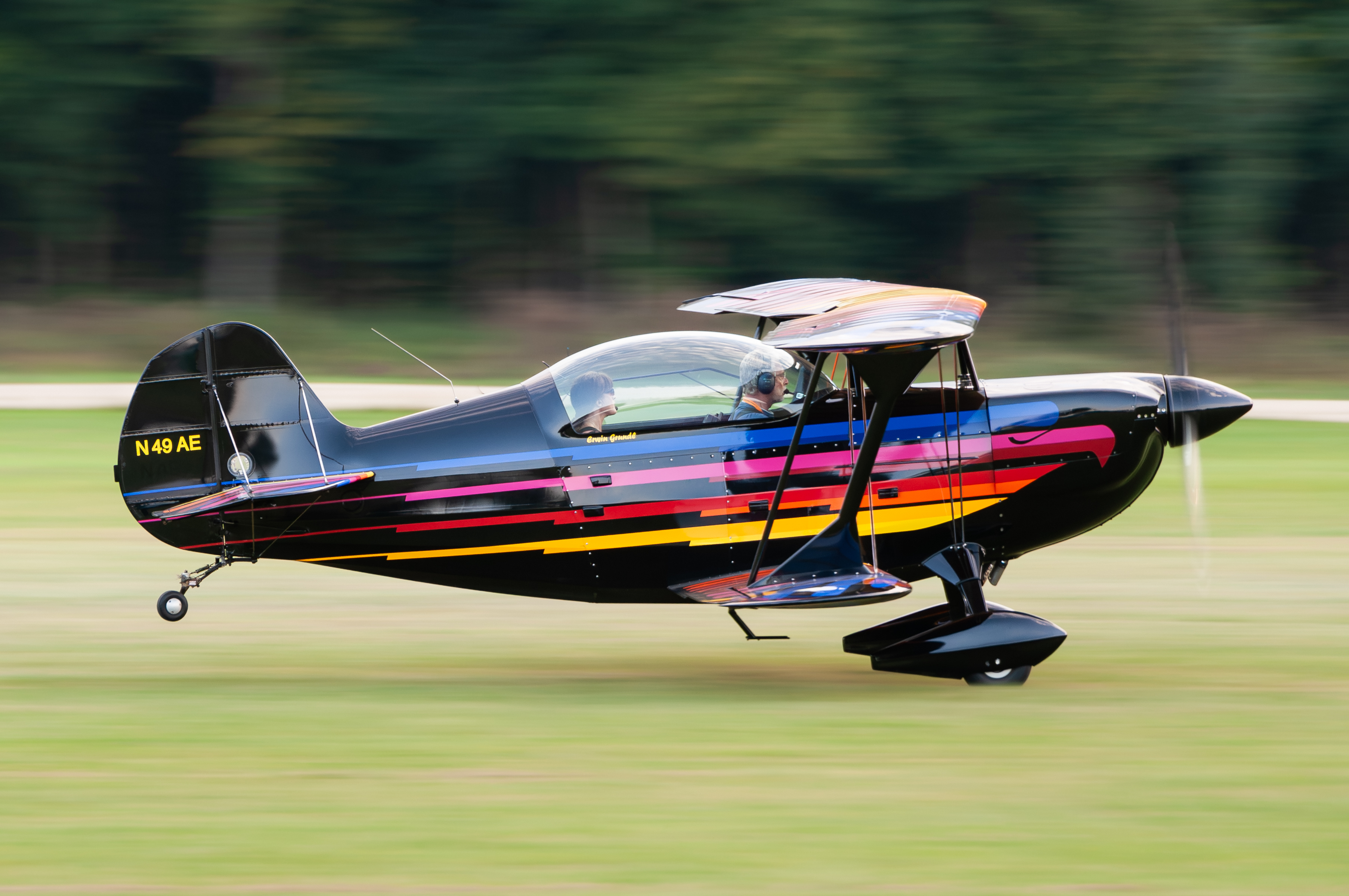
- Christen Eagle II

General information
- Type: Aerobatic aircraft
- Manufacturer: Christen; Aviat
- Designer: Frank Christensen

History
- First flight: February 1977

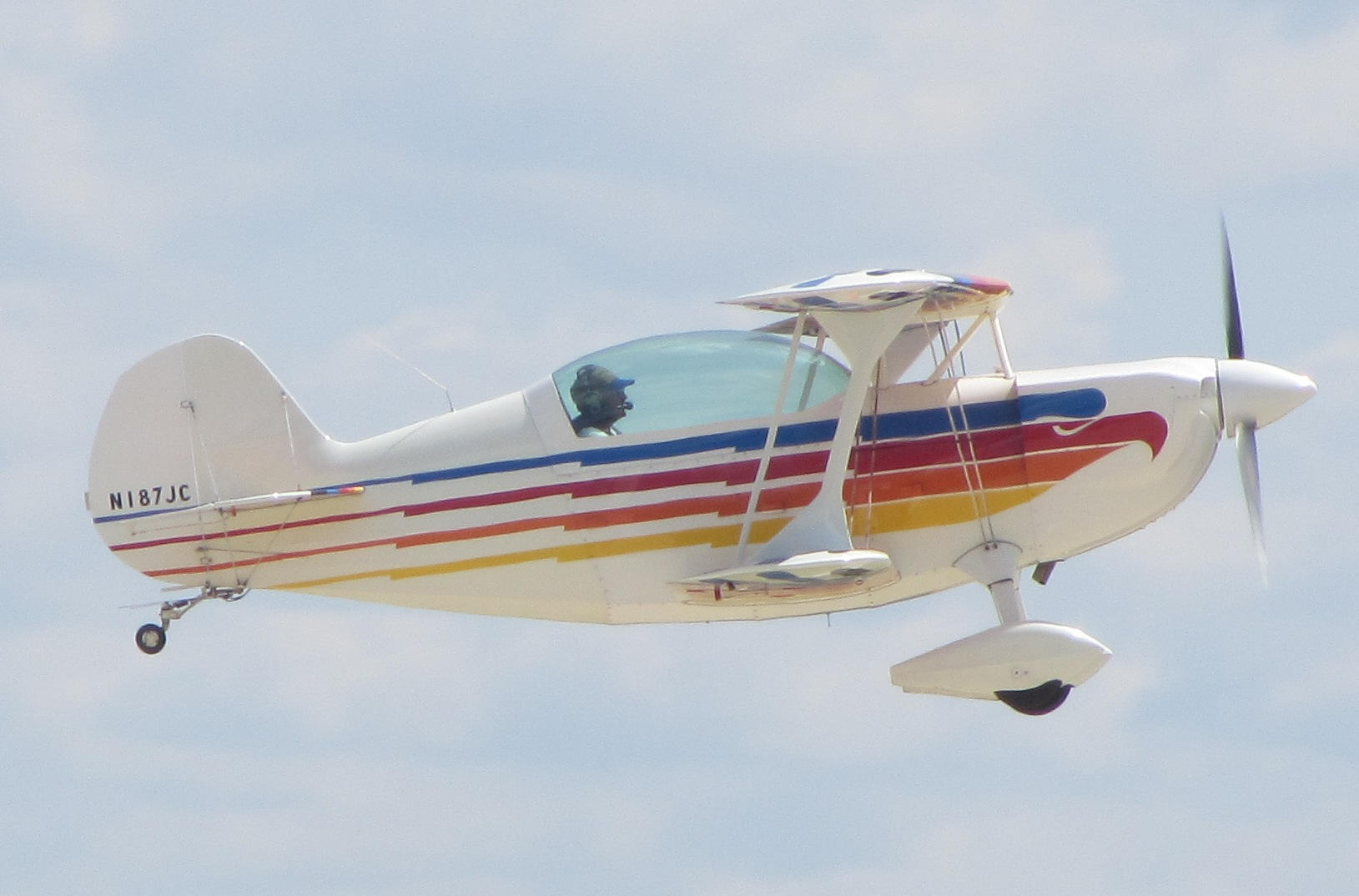
Christen Eagle II

The Christen Eagle is an aerobatic sporting biplane aircraft that has been produced in the United States since the late 1970s. In the 1990s, it became known as the Aviat Eagle after Aviat Aircraft purchased rights from Christen Industries. As of 2025, the airplane title has reverted back to the Christen Eagle after a newly formed Christen Industries renewed production.

== Design ==
The aircraft was intended to compete with the Pitts Special. Designed by Frank Christensen, originally of Salt Lake City, the Eagle II is marketed in kit form for homebuilding. The Eagle II is a small aircraft of conventional configuration with single-bay, equal-span staggered biplane wings braced with streamlined flying and landing wires and an I-strut to form a box truss. The pilot and a single passenger sit in tandem underneath a large bubble canopy. The tailwheel undercarriage is fixed, with the mainwheels mounted on spring aluminum legs. The main wheels are housed in streamlined fairings. The fuselage and tail are constructed of chromoly steel welded tube, with the forward fuselage skinned in aluminum and the rear fuselage and tail covered in fabric. The wing structure is Sitka spruce wood and fabric covered. The engine cowling is fiberglass. By 2011 over 350 aircraft were flying.

== Operational history ==
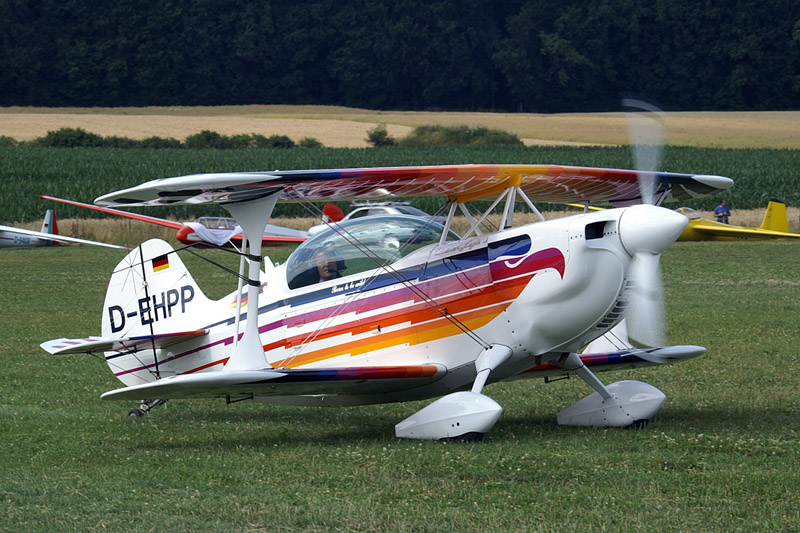
Christen Eagle II

In 1979, the Eagles Aerobatic Team (Charlie Hillard, Tom Poberezny, and Gene Soucy) chose the Christen Eagle as a replacement for their Pitts Special airshow act "The Red Devils". The act continued until 1995. All three Christen Eagles hang from the lobby of the EAA Airventure Museum in Oshkosh, Wisconsin.

== Variants ==
Christen Eagle I
Single seat variant. Lycoming AEIO-540 260 hp (190 kW). First design model, built at the San Carlos Airport. Four airframes built, one is now based in Dallas Texas, the other 3 are in the EAA Museum in Oshkosh WI.

Christen/Aviat Eagle II
Most common variant, two seat dual controls. Lycoming AEIO-360.200 hp (150 kW)

The first Eagle II produced (Serial #001) is on display at the Connecticut Air & Space Center in Stratford, CT.

Christen Super Eagle I 540
Two built. Lycoming AEIO-540 300 hp (220 kW). Formerly flown by the Iron Eagles aerobatic team, now owned by Professional Pilots based in Texas and Alaska.

Christen Super Eagle II
Several examples built, two seats, limited fuel tanks.

== Specifications ==
Data from Jane's All the World's Aircraft 2003–2004

General characteristics

- Crew: Two
- Length: 17 ft 11 in (5.46 m)
- Wingspan: 19 ft 11 in (6.07 m)
- Height: 6 ft 6 in (1.98 m)
- Wing area: 125.0 sq ft (11.61 m^{2})
- Empty weight: 1,025 lb (465 kg)
- Max takeoff weight: 1,578 lb (716 kg)
- Fuel capacity: 24 US gal (20 imp gal; 91 L) usable
- Powerplant: 1 × Textron Lycoming AEIO-360-A1D air-cooled flat-four, 200 hp (150 kW)
- Propellers: 2-bladed Hartzell HC-C2YK-4/C7666A-2 constant-speed propeller, 6 ft 4 in (1.93 m) diameter

Performance

- Maximum speed: 184 mph (296 km/h, 160 kn)
- Cruise speed: 165 mph (266 km/h, 143 kn)
- Stall speed: 58 mph (93 km/h, 50 kn)
- Never exceed speed: 210 mph (340 km/h, 180 kn)
- Range: 437 mi (703 km, 380 nmi)
- Service ceiling: 17,000 ft (5,200 m)
- g limits: +9, -6
- Roll rate: 187 degree per sec
- Rate of climb: 2,100 ft/min (11 m/s)

== See also ==
Aircraft of comparable role, configuration, and era

- Acro Sport II
- Sorrell Hiperbipe
- Steen Skybolt
- Pitts Special
