= Poberezny =

Poberezny is a surname, a transliteration of the Ukrainian surname Побережний. Notable people with the surname include:

- Paul Poberezny (1921–2013), American aviator, entrepreneur, and aircraft designer
- Tom Poberezny (1946–2022), American pilot and association executive
