= EAA Aviation Museum =

Aviation museum in Oshkosh, United States

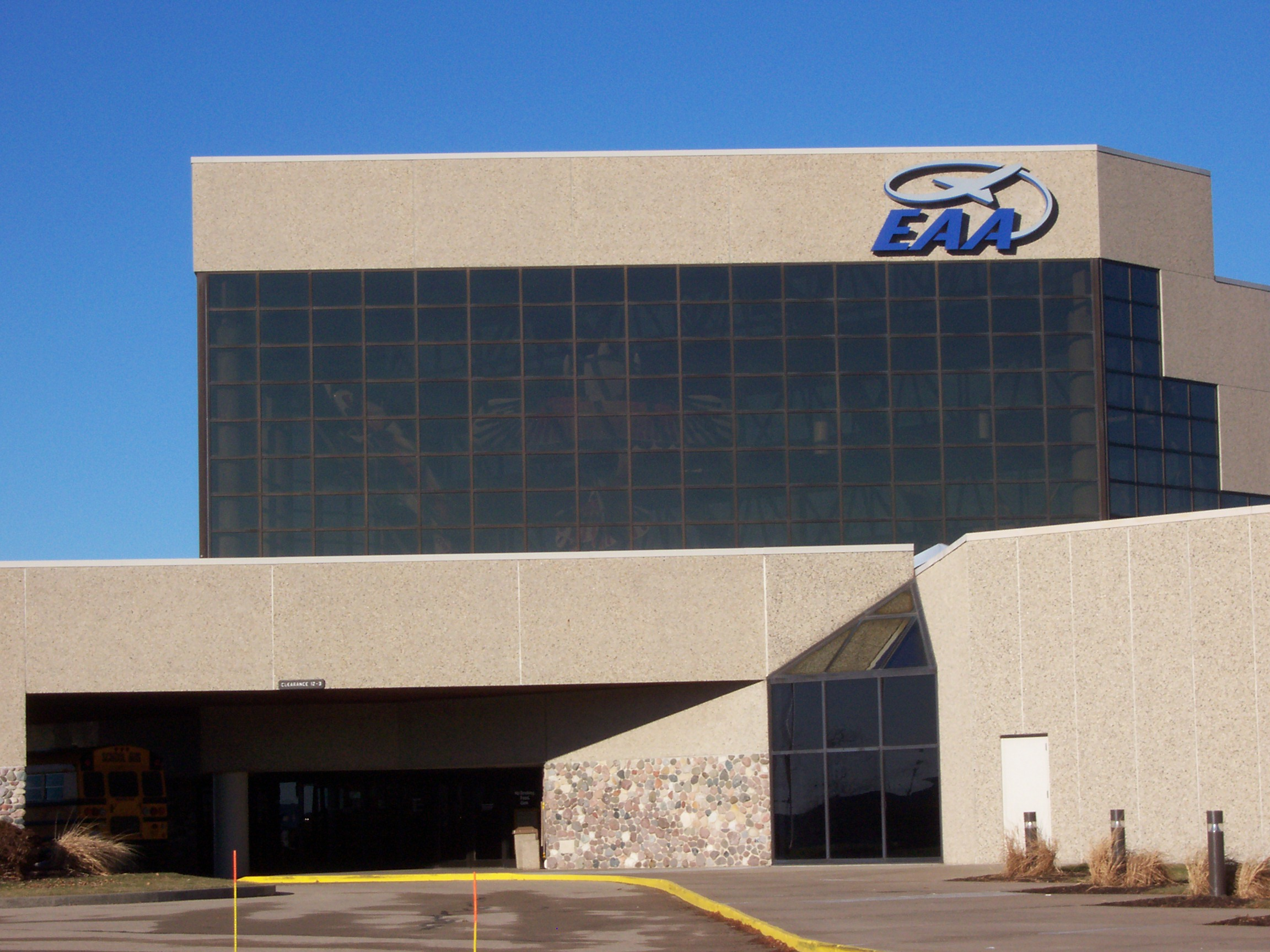
- Front entrance
- Former name: EAA AirVenture Museum
- Established: 1983; 43 years ago
- Location: Oshkosh, Wisconsin
- Coordinates: 43°59′03″N 088°34′42″W
- Type: Aviation museum
- Collection size: ~200 aircraft
- Director: Chris Henry
- Owner: Experimental Aircraft Association
- Parking: On site (no charge)
- Website: EAA.org/museum

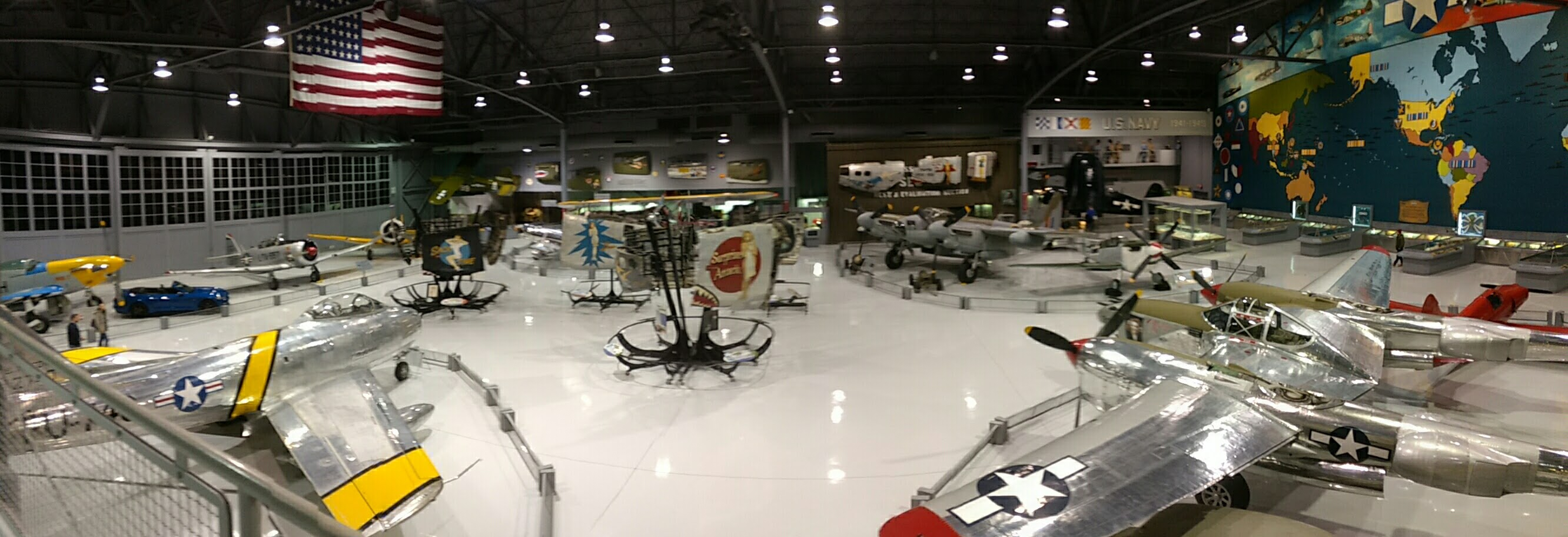
Panoramic shot of the Eagle Hangar's interior

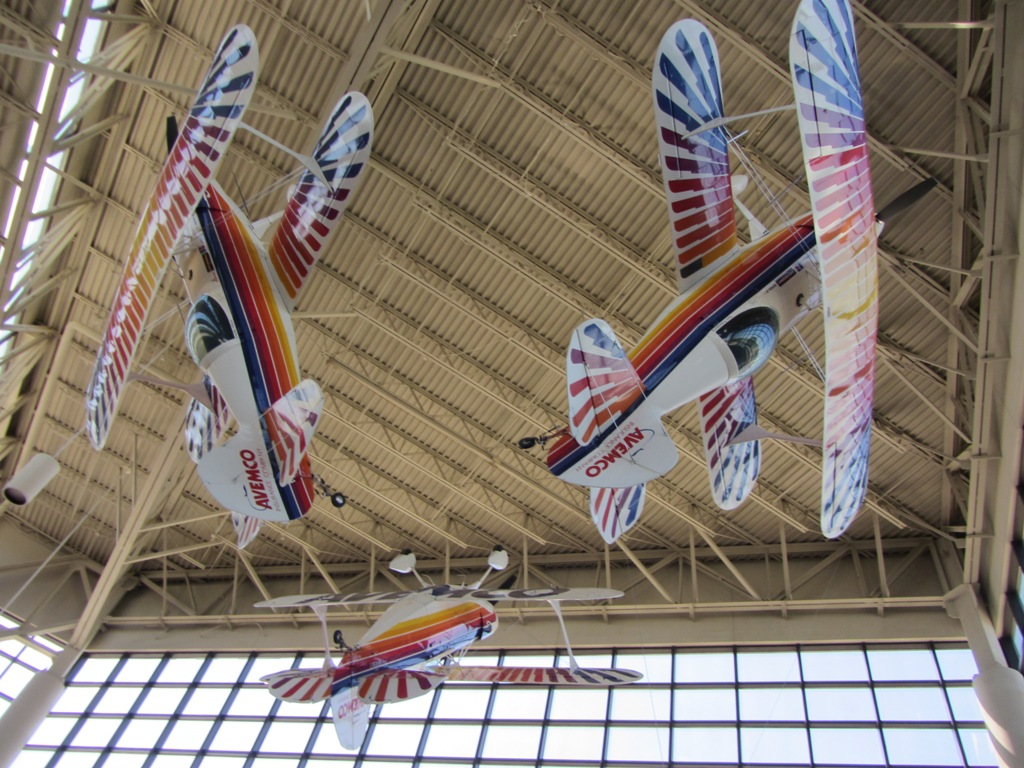
Eagles Aerobatic Team aircraft, flown by Tom Poberezny, Charlie Hillard and Gene Soucy, on display in the museum's entrance

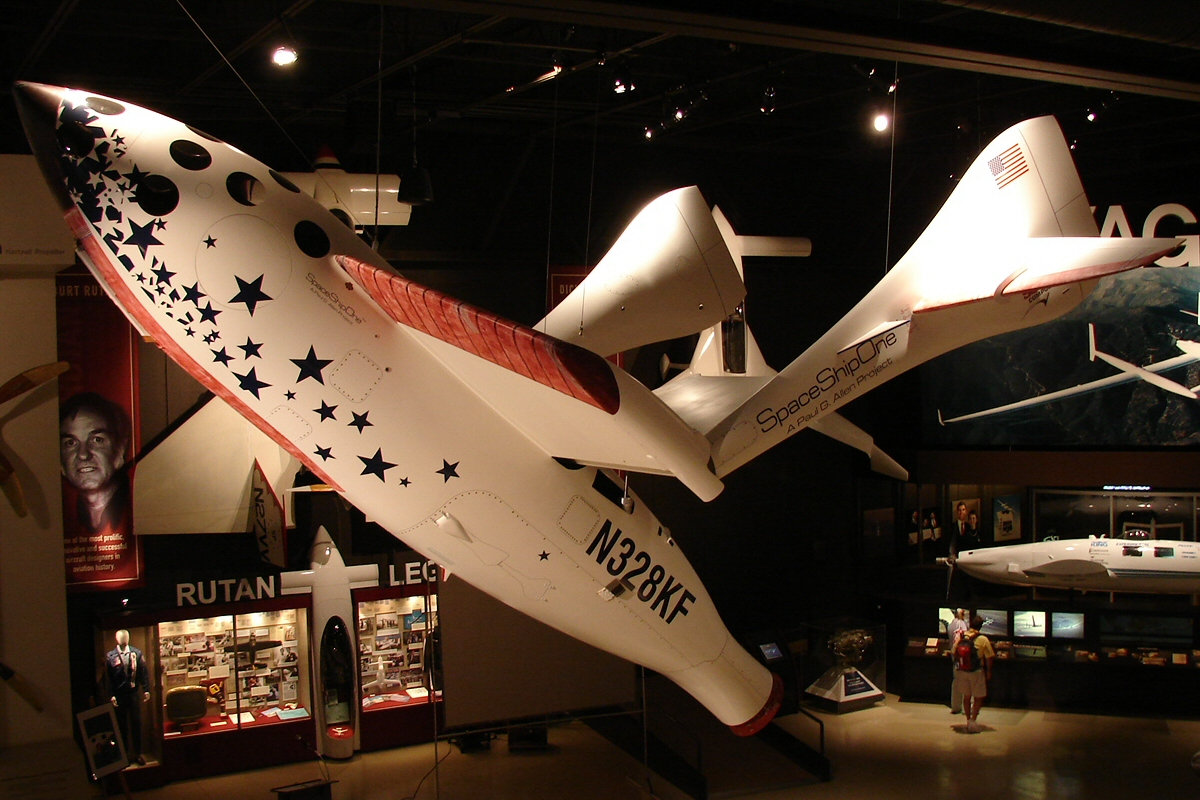
SpaceShipOne replica

The EAA Aviation Museum, formerly the EAA AirVenture Museum (or Air Adventure Museum), is an aircraft museum located in Oshkosh, Wisconsin, United States, adjacent to Wittman Regional Airport. It dedicated to the preservation and display of historic and experimental aircraft as well as antiques, classics, and warbirds. It is home of the museum's sponsoring organization, the Experimental Aircraft Association (EAA), as well as the EAA AirVenture Oshkosh, the world's biggest fly-in and airshow that takes place in late July.

With over 200 aircraft, indoors and outdoors, and other exhibits and activities (including occasional aircraft rides nearby), the AirVenture Museum is a key tourist attraction in Oshkosk. The museum is open year-round with the exception of a few holidays.

== History ==
EAA founder Paul Poberezny first proposed the EAA Air Museum and Education Center in August 1958. In the late 1970s, his son, EAA president Tom Poberezny, led the campaign to build the current updated EAA museum and headquarters, which was officially opened in 1983.

The EAA library has been open to EAA members since 1985.

The museum opened the 44,000-square-foot (4,100 m^{2}) Eagle Hangar in July 1989.

The museum opened an Education Center in July 2022. The new building includes a Pilot Proficiency Center.

== Facilities ==
The museum includes a children's section which provides extensive hands-on aviation-related exhibits and activities, most notably, a half scale F-22 Raptor model, numerous flight simulators, and a "control tower" observation platform overlooking Pioneer Airport.

=== Pioneer Airport ===
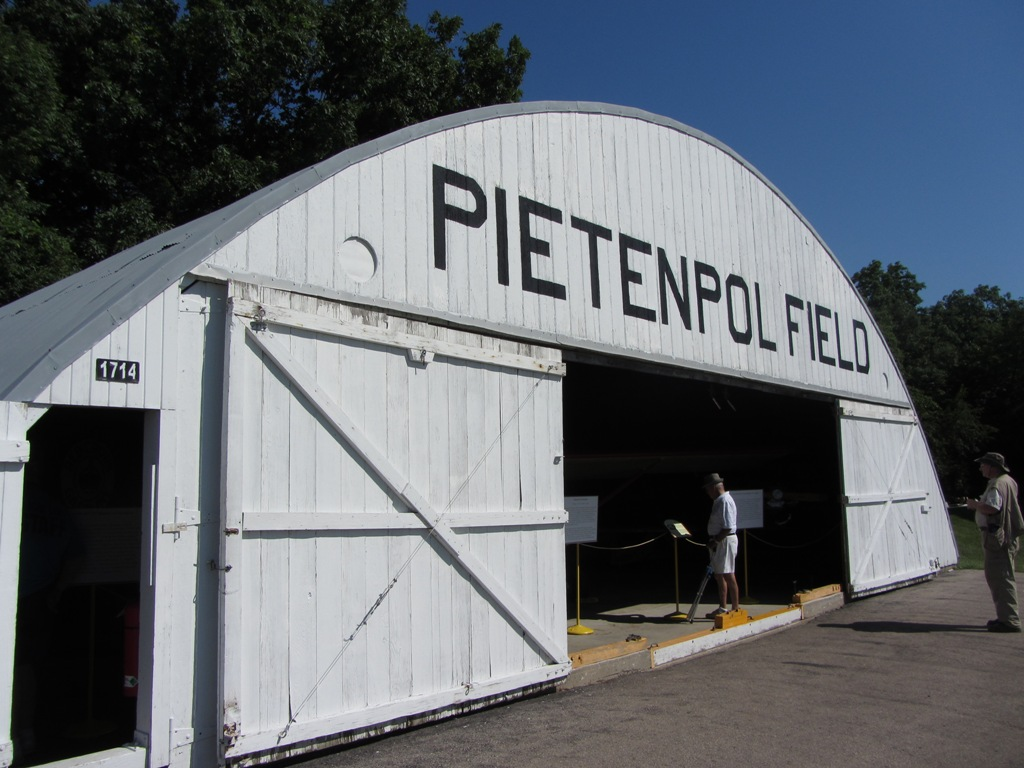
Hangar on the ground's Pioneer Airport field

Pioneer Airport is located immediately behind the museum. Opened in 1984, it is built to look like a 1930s period airfield, featuring a turf runway.

== Exhibits ==
The museum's collection displays more than 200 aircraft and 20,000 artifacts, including civilian and military aircraft of historic importance, and aircraft popular with aviation hobbyists—vintage, homebuilt, racing and stunt aircraft.

Some of the more historic and unusual planes include a Curtiss Pusher, Bleriot XI, Curtiss Jenny, Pitcairn PCA-2 autogyro, Sikorsky S-38 amphibian flying boat, and the Taylor Aerocar flying car, as well as various warbirds and Golden Age aircraft.

Other exhibits include functional replicas of the Wright Flyer and its predecessor, Octave Chanute's hang glider, French and German World War I fighters, Lindbergh's Ryan NYP "Spirit of St. Louis" replica (flown in the movie), and a replica of the historic Laird Super Solution 1931 racer.

A large section on Burt Rutan's aircraft includes a portion of his homebuilts, replicas of his globe-circling Rutan Voyager and the first private spacecraft, Space Ship One, crafted by Rutan's own shop.

The museum has a variety of donated aircraft, including the Church Midwing, Funk B, Monnett Moni, and many homebuilt and kitplane aircraft (some foreign)—many built by the original designers. Notable homebuilts on display consist of Van's Aircraft's Van's RV-3, designed by Richard VanGrunsven, Christen Industries' Christen Eagle II, designed by Frank Christensen, and Cirrus Aircraft's first model, the Cirrus VK-30, designed by the Klapmeier brothers.

== Programs ==
=== Rides ===
Aircraft rides are offered through various EAA programs at the museum's Pioneer Airport, or at the adjoining Wittman Field, especially during AirVenture Fly-In and Airshow, typically in late summer. These include a vintage Ford Tri-Motor airliner and a Boeing B-17 Flying Fortress World War II bomber, the Aluminum Overcast, that occasionally sell rides at the adjoining Wittman Field. A particular program for the former are the Fall Colors Flights, short flights to view colorful fall foliage in the area. Helicopter rides, typically in Bell 47 ("MASH") helicopters are also available occasionally at adjacent Pioneer Airport, or from adjoining Wittman Field.

=== Oral history ===
The museum conducts oral history interviews with notable individuals in aviation as part of its Timeless Voices program.

== See also ==
- Historic Aircraft Restoration Museum
- List of aerospace museums
- Mitchell Gallery of Flight
- Young Eagles program
