= Aviat Husky =

American utility aircraft

Husky
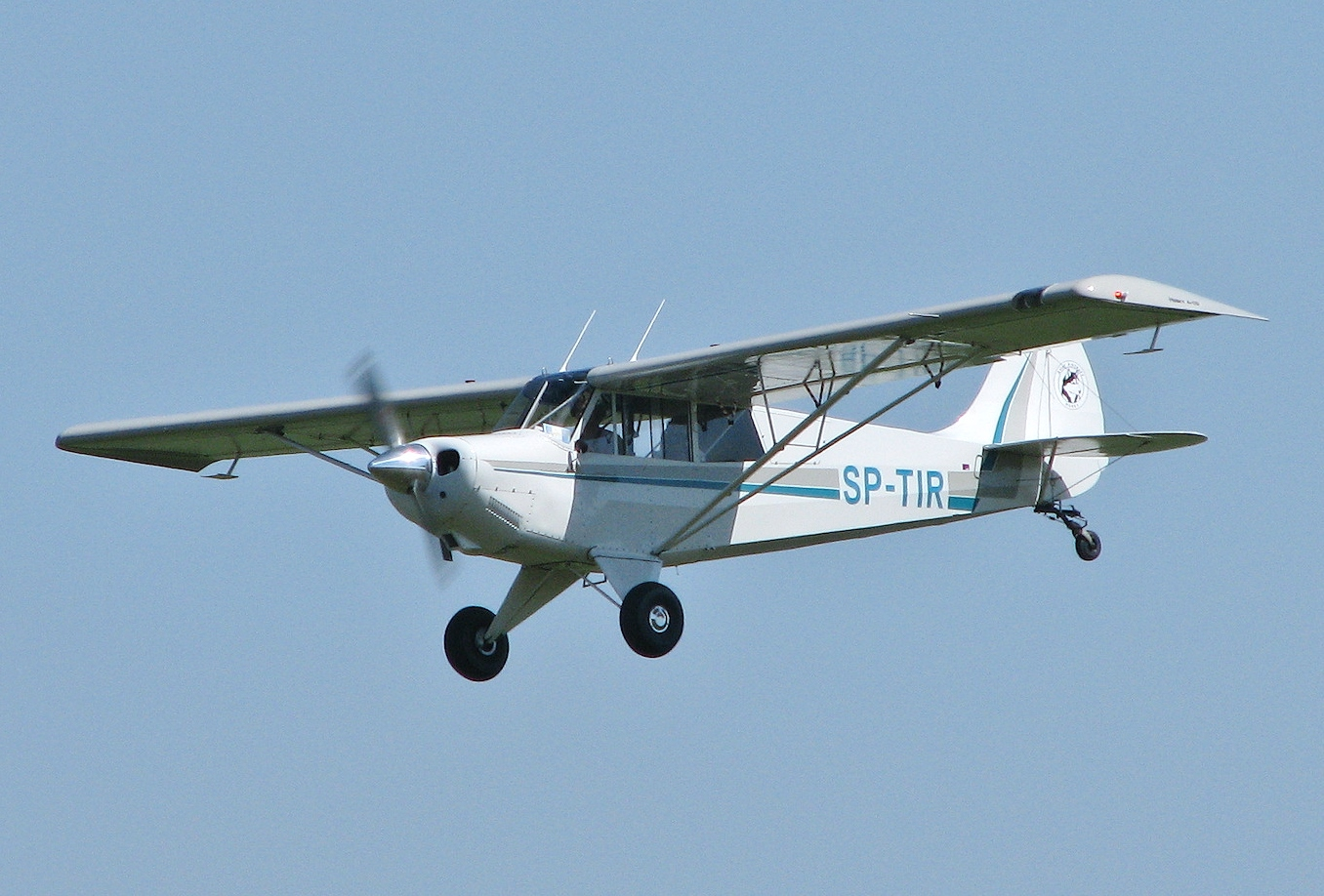
- Aviat A-1 Husky

General information
- Type: Light utility aircraft
- Manufacturer: Aviat
- Designer: Christen Industries
- Status: Active service
- Number built: 650+

History
- Introduction date: 1987
- First flight: 1986

The Aviat Husky is a tandem two-seat, high-wing, utility light aircraft built by Aviat Aircraft of Afton, Wyoming.

It is the only all-new light aircraft that was designed and entered series production in the United States in the mid-to-late 1980s.

== Development ==
Design work by Christen Industries began in 1985. The aircraft is one of the few in its class designed with the benefit of CAD software. The prototype first flew in 1986, and certification was awarded the following year.

With more than 650 aircraft sold between its introduction and 2008, the Husky was one of the best-selling light aircraft designs of the period.

== Design ==
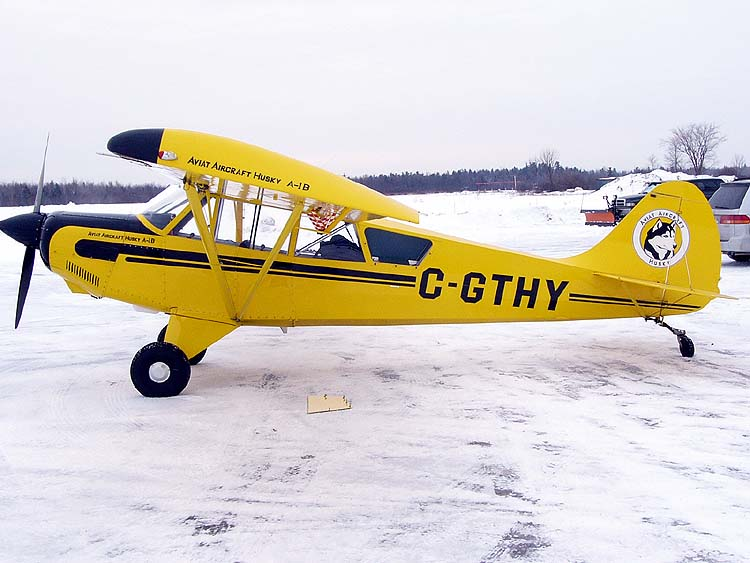
Husky A-1B

The Husky features a braced high wing, tandem seating and dual controls. The structure is steel tube frames and Dacron covering over all but the rear of the fuselage, plus metal leading edges on the wings. The high wing was selected for good all-around visibility, making the Husky ideal for observation and patrol roles. Power is supplied by a relatively powerful (for the Husky's weight) 180 hp (134 kW) Textron Lycoming O-360 flat-four piston engine turning a constant speed propeller. In 2015 a reversible MT Propeller was approved under a Supplemental type certificate for better control during floatplane water operations. The Husky's high power-to-weight ratio and low wing loading result in good short-field performance.

Options include floats, skis and banner and glider tow hooks.

== Operational history ==
The Husky has been used for observation duties, fisheries patrol, pipeline inspection, glider towing, border patrol and other utility missions. Notable users include the US Department of the Interior and Agriculture and the Kenya Wildlife Service, which flies seven on aerial patrols of elephant herds as part of the fight against illegal ivory poaching.

== Variants ==
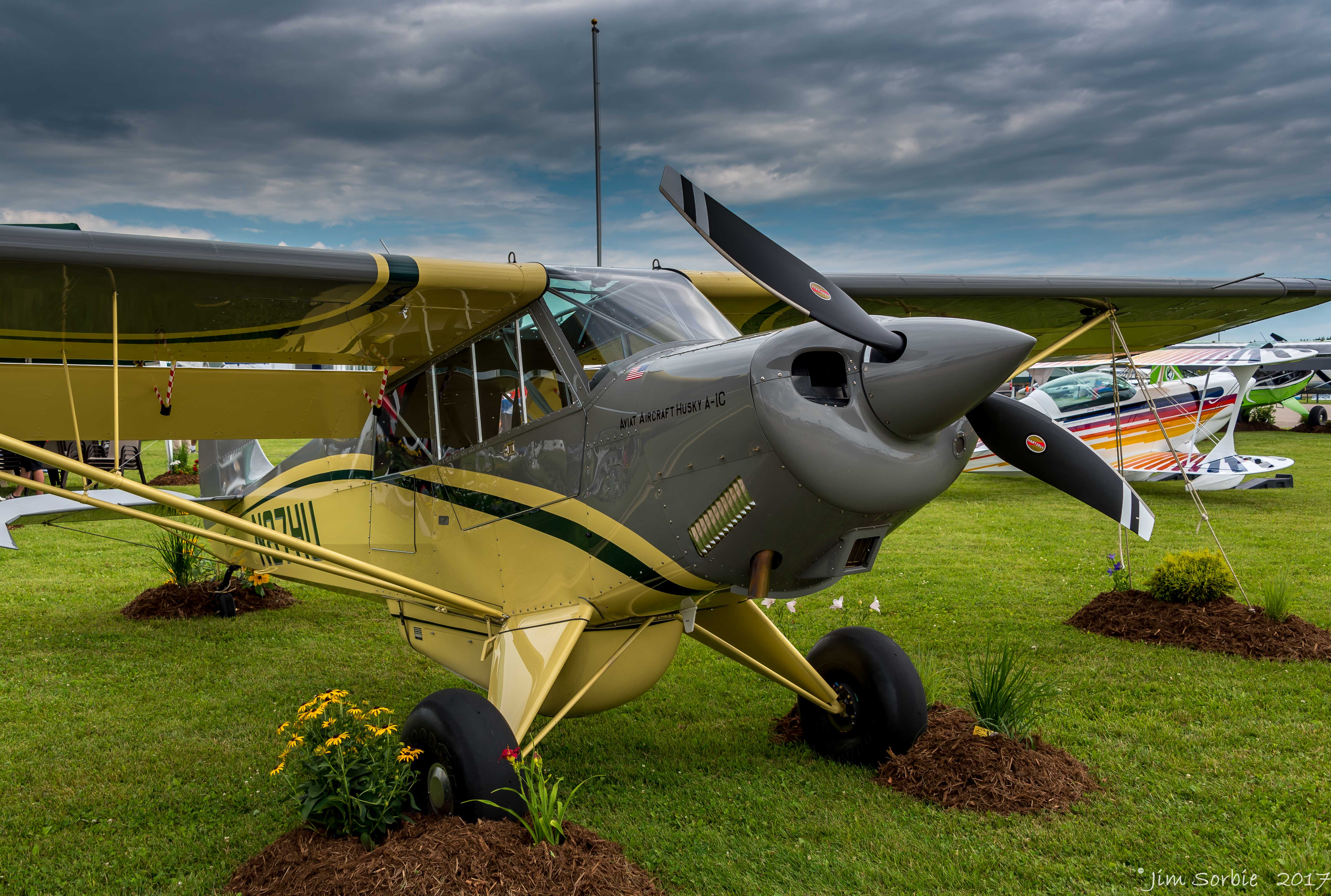
Aviat A-1C-180 Husky

The Husky comes in six versions:

Husky A-1
Certified on 1 May 1987. Maximum gross weight is 1,800 lb (816 kg). Powered by a Lycoming 0-360-A1P or a Lycoming O-360-C1G of 180 hp (134 kW)
Husky A-1A
Certified on 28 January 1998. Maximum gross weight is 1,890 lb (857 kg). Powered by a Lycoming 0-360-A1P of 180 hp (134 kW)

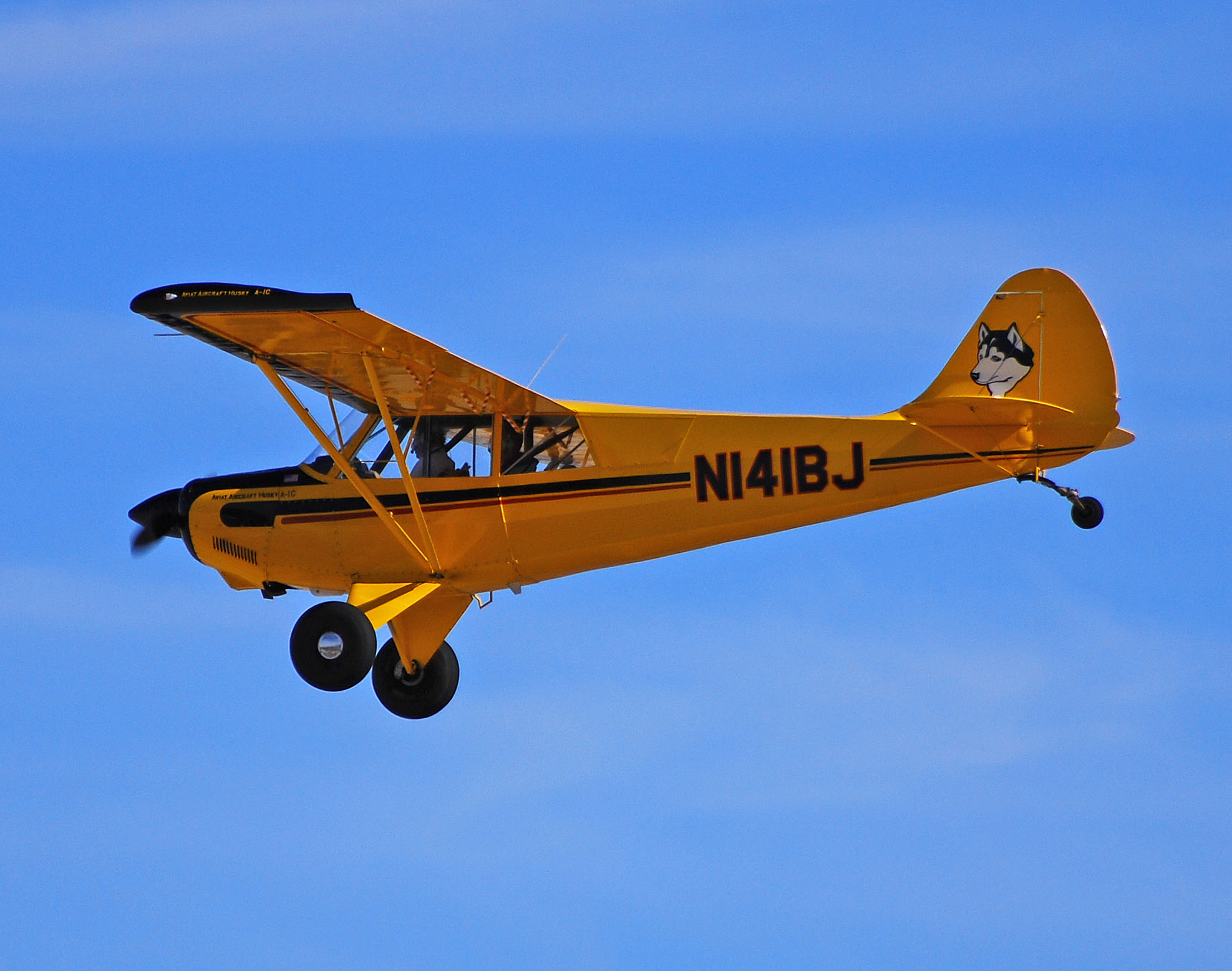
Aviat A-1C Husky

Husky A-1B
Certified on 28 January 1998. Powered by a Lycoming 0-360-A1P of 180 hp (134 kW) The A-1B can be modified to accept a Lycoming IO-360-A1D6 engine of 200 hp (149 kW) and an MT MTV-15-B/205-58 propeller under an STC.
Husky A-1B-160 Pup
Certified on 18 August 2003 without flaps and 21 October 2005 with flaps. Powered by a Lycoming 0-320-D2A, 160 hp (119 kW). The Pup has a smaller engine, a gross weight of 2,000 lb (907 kg) and a useful load of 775 lb (352 kg)
Husky A-1C-180

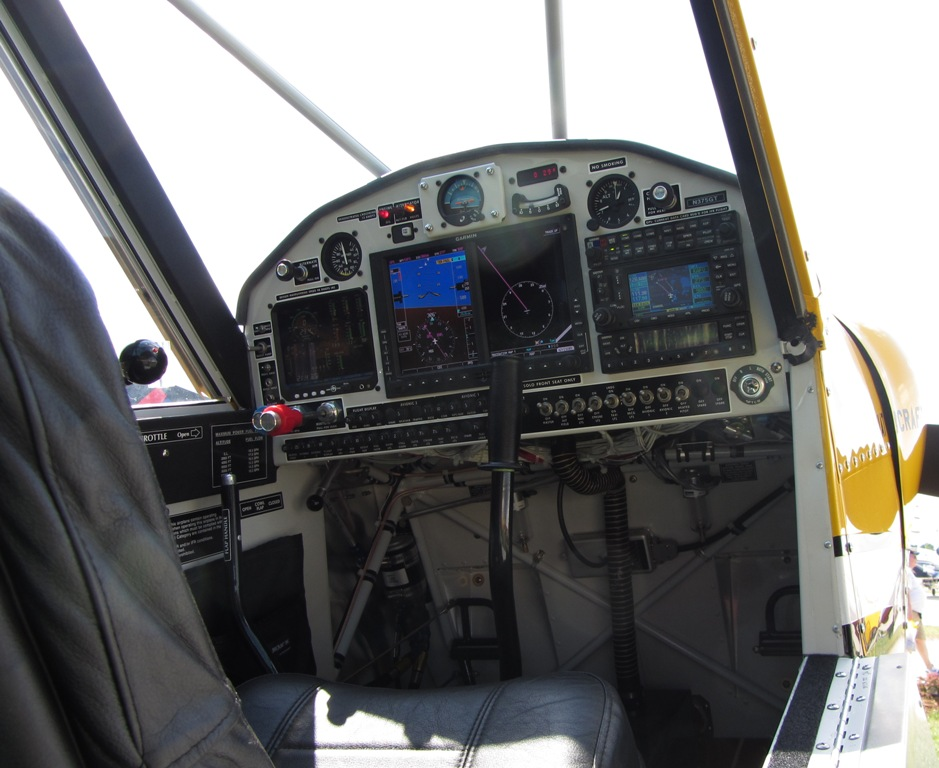
A Garmin equipped A-1C cockpit

Certified on 24 September 2007. Powered by a Lycoming 0-360-A1P of 180 hp (134 kW). The 180 has a gross weight of 2,200 lb (998 kg) and a useful load of 925 lb (420 kg)
Husky A-1C-200
Certified on 24 September 2007. Powered by a Lycoming IO-360-A1D6 of 200 hp (149 kW). The 200 has a gross weight of 2,250 lb (1,021 kg) and a useful load of 880 lb (399 kg)

== Specifications (A-1C Husky) ==
Data from Aviat website

General characteristics

- Crew: one
- Capacity: one passenger
- Length: 22 ft 7 in (6.88 m)
- Wingspan: 35 ft 6 in (10.82 m)
- Wing area: 183 sq ft (17.0 m^{2})
- Empty weight: 1,275 lb (578 kg) on wheels
- Gross weight: 2,200 lb (998 kg) on wheels and floats
- Fuel capacity: 50 US gallons (190 litres)
- Powerplant: 1 × Lycoming O-360-A1P four cylinder, four stroke piston aircraft engine, 180 hp (130 kW)
- Propellers: 2-bladed Hartzell Propeller, 6 ft 4 in (1.93 m) diameter

Performance

- Maximum speed: 145 mph (233 km/h, 126 kn)
- Cruise speed: 140 mph (230 km/h, 120 kn)
- Stall speed: 53 mph (85 km/h, 46 kn) flaps down, power off
- Range: 800 mi (1,300 km, 700 nmi) at 55% power
- Service ceiling: 20,000 ft (6,100 m)
- Rate of climb: 1,500 ft/min (7.6 m/s)

Avionics

- VHF comm radio
- Transponder
- GPS optional

== See also ==
Related development

- Piper Super Cub

Aircraft of comparable role, configuration, and era

- American Champion/Bellanca Scout
