= Spinks Akromaster =

Akromaster
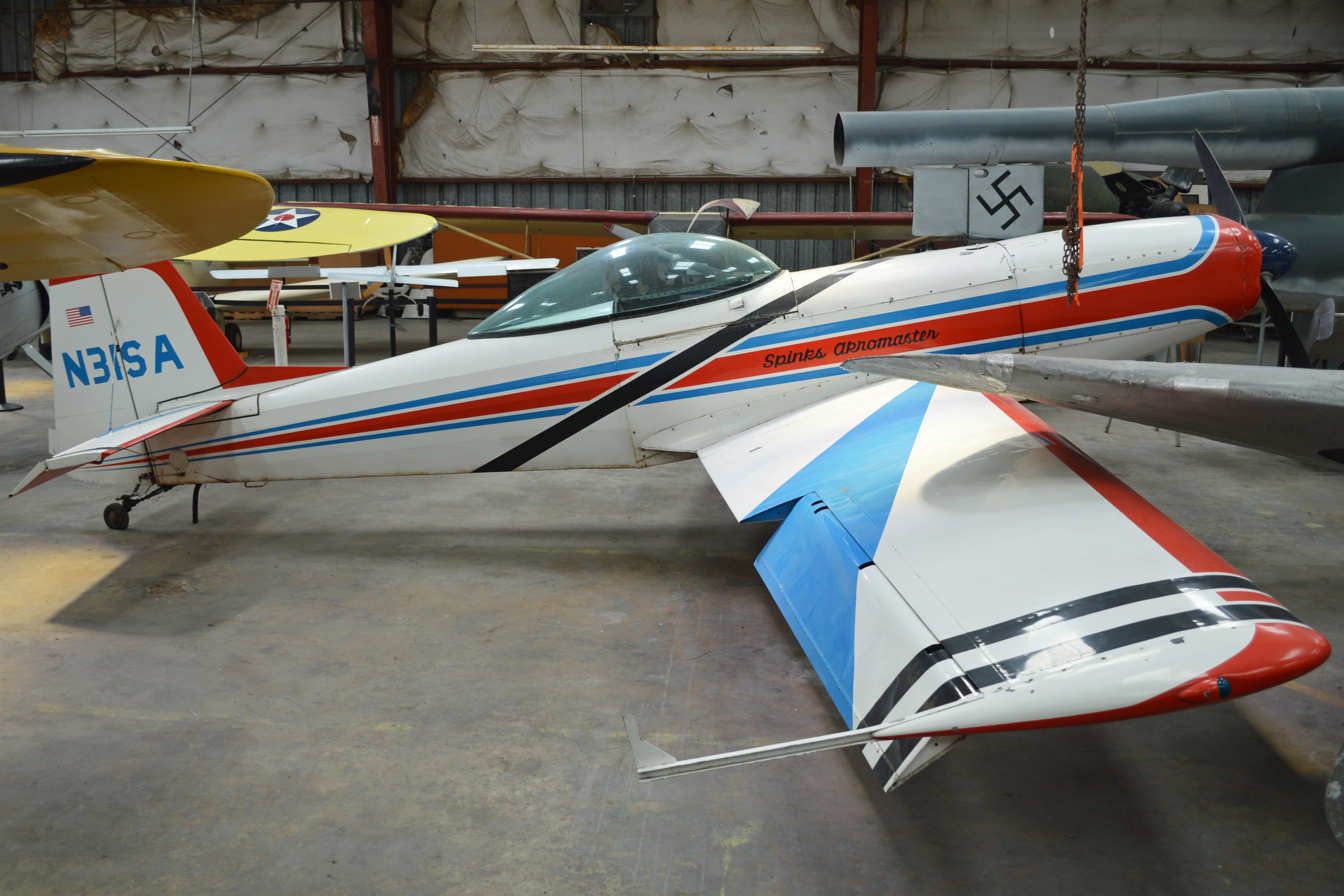

General information
- Type: Aerobatic aircraft
- National origin: United States
- Designer: Charlie Hillard

The Spinks Akromaster is an aerobatic aircraft that was designed by Charlie Hillard.

== Design and development ==
"Pappy" Spinks provided the funding and name to Charlie Hillard for the creation of the Akromaster.

The Akromaster is a single-seat, low-wing, monoplane with conventional landing gear and a symmetrical airfoil. It features inverted fuel and oil systems and an air show smoke system.

== Operational history ==
During certification testing of the cabin version of the Akromaster, aerobatic pilot Harold Krier was unable to recover from a flat spin and died due to a parachute malfunction.

Charlie Hillard flew the Akromaster prior to forming the Red Devils aerobatic team. Hillard placed third in the 1970 world aerobatic championships with the aircraft.

== Specifications (Akromaster) ==
Data from Air Trails

General characteristics

- Crew: 1
- Length: 24 ft (7.3 m)
- Wingspan: 30 ft (9.1 m)
- Height: 6 ft 6 in (1.98 m)
- Wing area: 120 sq ft (11 m^{2})
- Empty weight: 1,300 lb (590 kg)
- Gross weight: 1,775 lb (805 kg)
- Powerplant: 1 × Lycoming AIO-360-AIA four cylinder horizontally-opposed four stroke aircraft engine, 200 hp (150 kW)
- Propellers: 2-bladed Hartzell constant speed

== On Display ==
- Texas Air Museum - Stinson Chapter
