= Charlie Hillard =

American aerobatics pilot (1938–1996)

- Born: March 22, 1938
- Died: April 16, 1996 (aged 58); Lakeland, Florida
- Known for: Aerobatics

Charlie Hillard (March 22, 1938 – April 16, 1996) was an American aerobatics pilot, and the first American to win the world aerobatics title.

Hillard formed the Red Devils aerobatic team in 1971 with fellow pilots Gene Soucy and Tom Poberezny. In 1979 the three re-formed as the Eagles Aerobatic Team, which they would fly as for more than 25 years, setting the record for the longest-running aerobatic team with the same members in the world.

In 1996, he was killed at the Sun 'n Fun fly-in in Lakeland, Florida, when the Hawker Sea Fury he was flying overturned after landing in a crosswind.

== Early life ==
Charlie R. Hillard was born March 22, 1938, in Fort Worth, Texas. At the age of 16, he secretly began taking flying lessons, having saved enough money working at his father's car dealership. A few years later, he would purchase his first airplane, a Piper Cub, while attending Georgia Tech.

In 1958, at the age of 20, Hillard joined the US skydiving team, and became the first person in the US to pass a baton in freefall. The same year, he began flying aerobatics at airshows. In 1967, he won the National Aerobatic Championship, In 1970 he competed in the Spinks Akromaster, an aircraft of his own design, and in 1972, won the World Aerobatics Championship, the first American ever to do so.

== Eagles Aerobatic Team ==
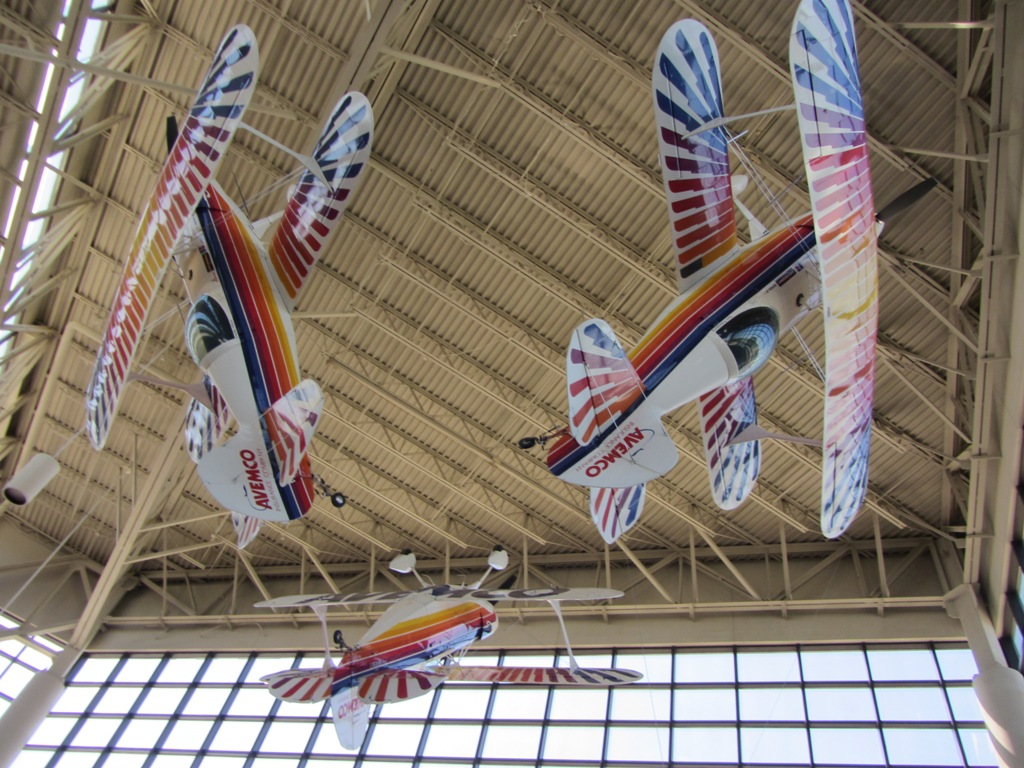
Eagles Aerobatic Team aircraft flown by Poberezny, Hillard, and Soucy on display at the EAA Airventure Museum

Hillard formed the Red Devils Aerobatic Team in 1971, with fellow pilots Gene Soucy and Tom Poberezny. The Red Devils flew the Pitts Special aircraft, and were a popular draw at airshows around the country. In 1979, aircraft designer Frank Christensen invited the team to test fly a new aerobatic aircraft he had designed: the Christen Eagle. The Devils were so impressed that they switched their team aircraft to the Eagle, and renamed the Red Devils to the Eagles Aerobatic Team, with Charlie Hillard as the lead pilot. The Eagles Aerobatic Team would fly together for more than 25 years, and 1000 performances, setting a record for the longest-running aerobatic team with the same members.

During this time, Hillard also flew as a pilot for Hollywood, in the movies Aces: Iron Eagle III and Cloud Dancer, as well as the TV movie Skyward.

== Later career and death ==
In 1995, the Eagles team disbanded. Hillard began to fly solo performances in a Hawker Sea Fury. It was in this aircraft that he was killed on April 16, 1996, when the aircraft flipped over upon landing, following an aerobatic performance at the Sun 'n Fun fly-in in Lakeland Florida. He had over 15,000 hours of flight time at the time of his death. Hillard's Sea Fury was rebuilt and is owned by Joe Thibodeau of Denver, who entered the aircraft in the Reno Air Races Unlimited Class as race #21. His 1931 Great Lakes 2T1E has been restored in 2011 and attends airshows. Hillards' Pitts and Christen Biplanes are on display at the EAA AirVenture Museum in Oshkosh, Wisconsin.

== Aviation achievements and awards ==
- National Aerobatic Champion, 1967
- First American to medal in a world aerobatics championship (Bronze, 1968)
- First American to win the World Aerobatic Championship (individual - 1972)
- Led the American aerobatics team to two world championships (1970, 1972)
- Author of the Federal Aviation Regulations for aerobatic competency evaluations (ACE)
- Founder of the Aerobatic Club of America
- Winner of the ICAS Wilkinson Sword of Excellence, 1983
- International Aerobatic Club Hall of Fame, 1990
- ICAS Foundation Air Show Hall of Fame, 1997

== See also ==
- FAI World Aerobatic Championships
- Paul Poberezny
- List of airshow accidents
