= Aviat =

American aircraft manufacturer

Aviat Aircraft
- Industry: Aerospace
- Predecessor: Christen Industries
- Founded: 1991
- Headquarters: Afton, Wyoming, United States
- Website: aviataircraft.com

Aviat Aircraft Inc. is an American manufacturer of sport and utility aircraft based in Afton, Wyoming.

== History ==
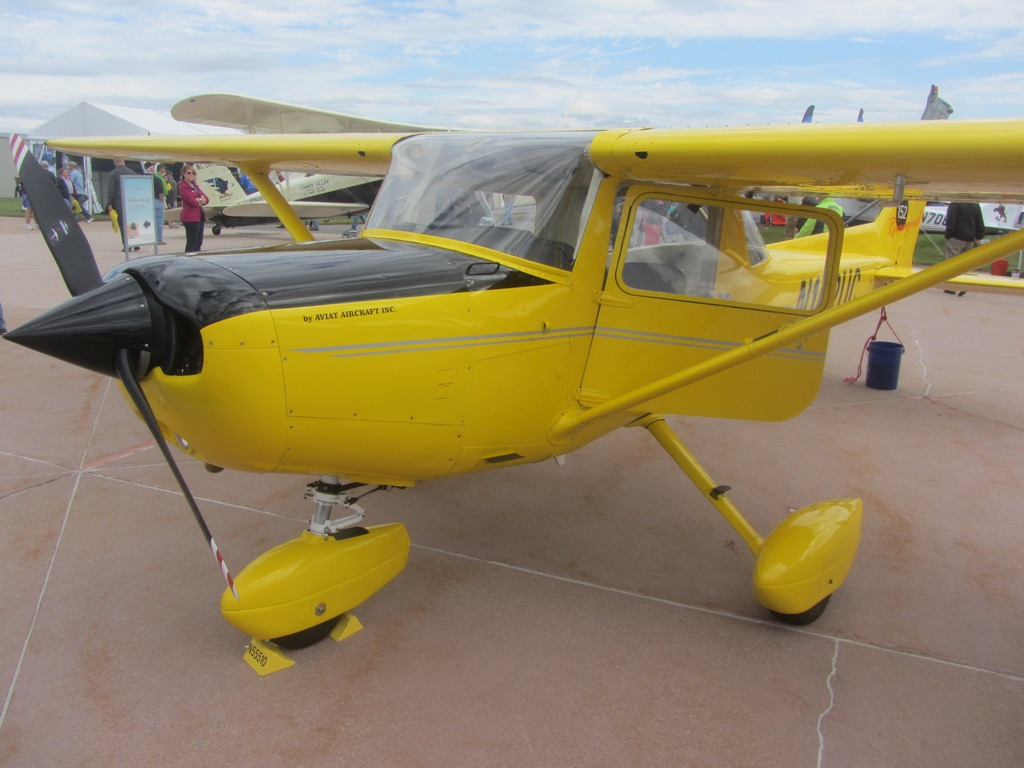
Aviat Aircraft Cessna 152

The company was founded in 1991 based on the history of the Call Aircraft Company and the product lines of the Pitts and Christen companies. In 1995, the company was purchased by Stuart Horn and renamed Aviat Aircraft Incorporated.

In 1999, Aviat purchased the rights to the Globe Swift with the intent on bringing the example back into production. A lawsuit between LoPresti's use of the design for the LoPresti Fury delayed entry of both aircraft from the market.

The company also produces the Aviat 150 and Aviat 152. These are overhauled, rebuilt and painted Cessna 150 and Cessna 152s.

== Aircraft ==
Model name	First flight	Number built	Type
Aviat Special			Single engine aerobatic biplane
Aviat Eagle II			Single engine aerobatic biplane
Aviat Husky			Single engine cabin monoplane
Aviat 152			Single engine cabin monoplane
