= Mitchell Gallery of Flight =

Aviation museum in Wisconsin

Coordinates: 42°56′54″N 87°54′06″W

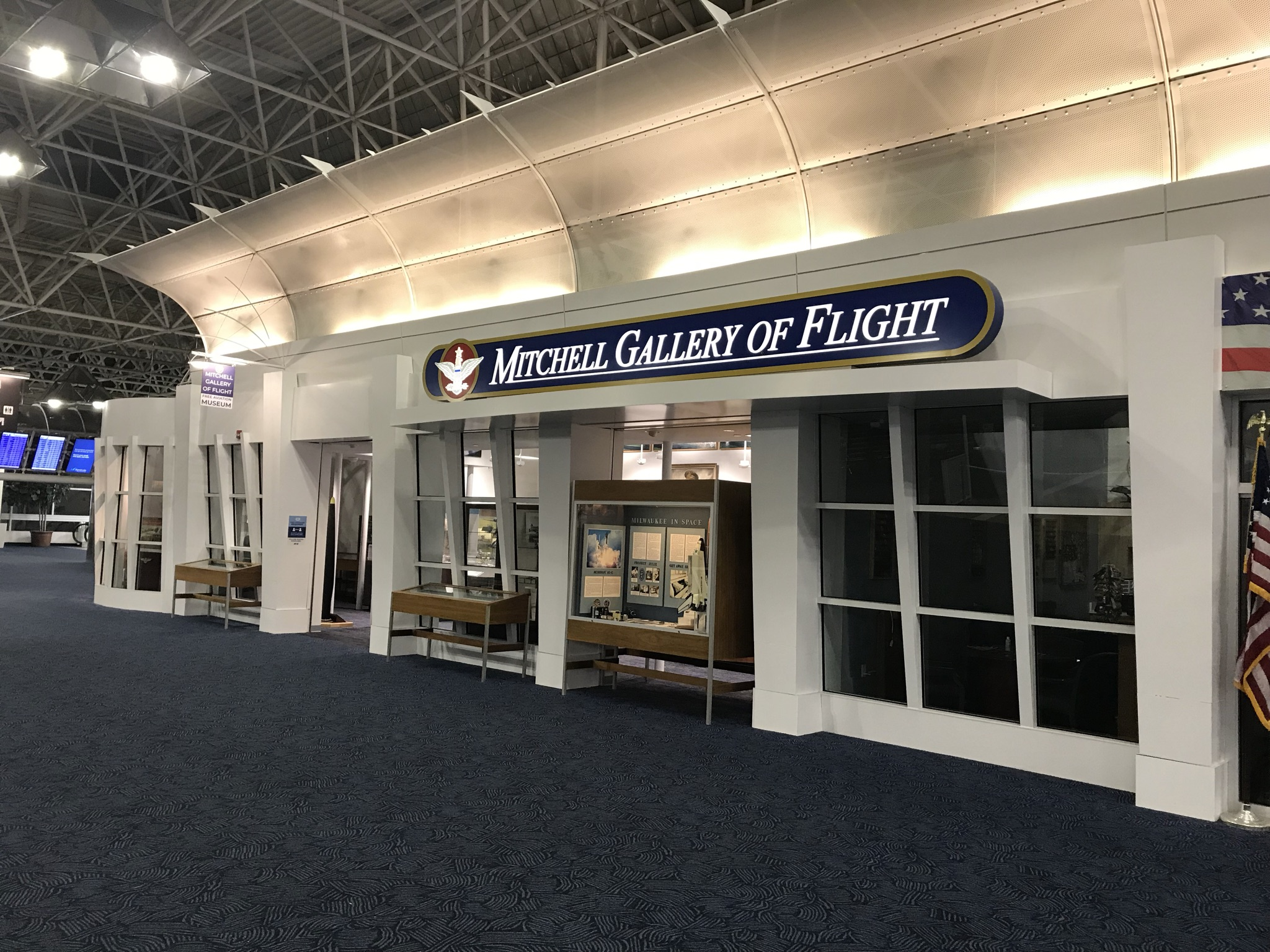

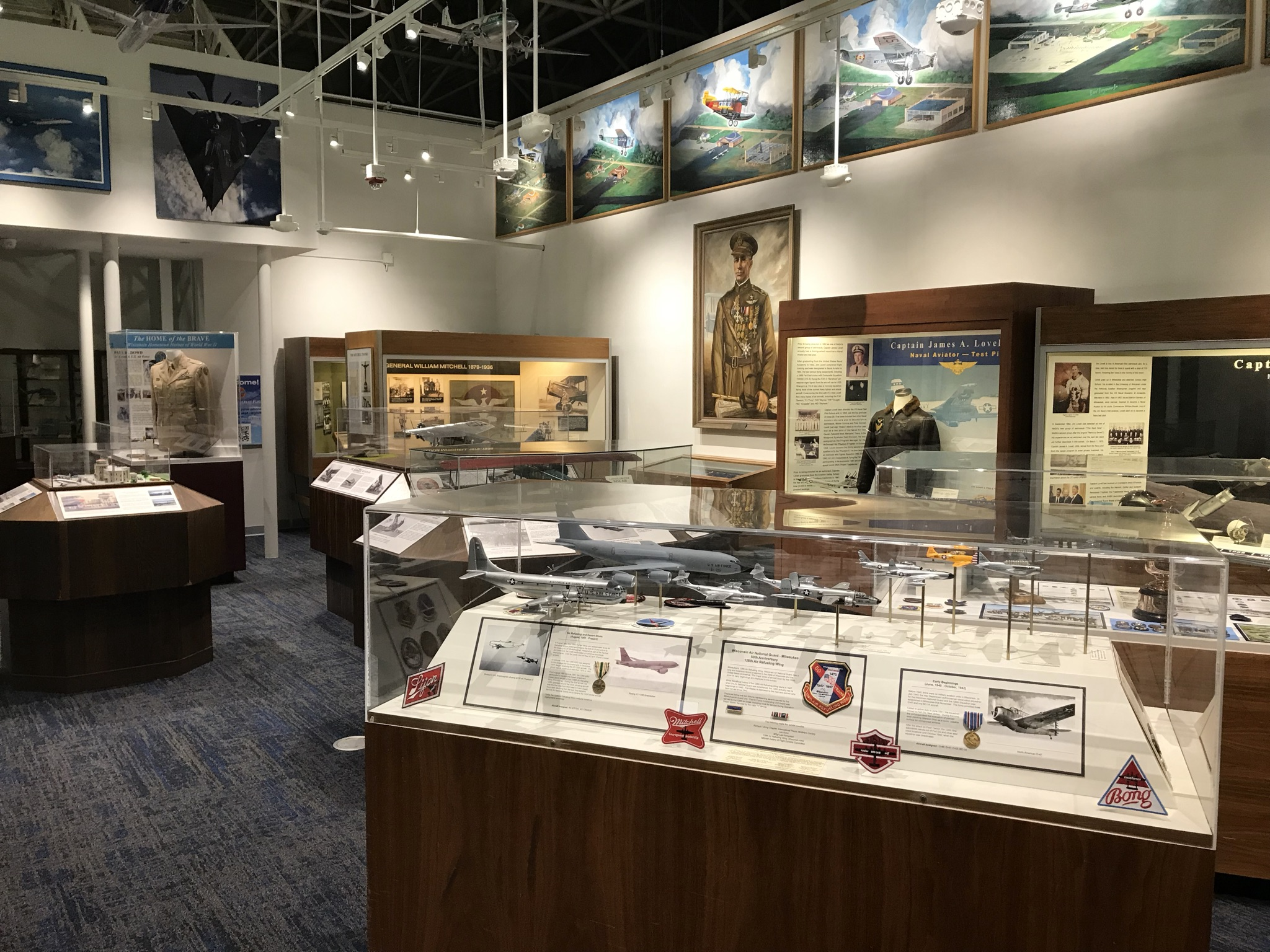

The Mitchell Gallery of Flight is an aviation museum located inside Milwaukee Mitchell International Airport in Milwaukee, Wisconsin in the United States.

== Description ==
Permanent gallery exhibits highlight aviation history along with some of Milwaukee's contributions to the aerospace industry.

- Richard Bong from Poplar, Wisconsin is recognized as the United States' all time "Ace of Aces".
- Charles Lindbergh and his visit to Milwaukee after the historic non-stop flight across the Atlantic Ocean.
- James A. Lovell, Jr. is a former NASA astronaut and commander of the infamous Apollo 13 mission.
- Lester Maitland, born in Milwaukee, was a World War II air commander and respected endurance flier.
- Billy Mitchell was an American general who is regarded as the father of the United States Air Force.
- Lance Sijan was a United States Air Force officer and fighter pilot who was awarded the Medal of Honor.
- Antique propellers dating back to World War I, which were manufactured by Matthews Brothers Woodworking Company of Milwaukee.
- An exhibit dedicated to Milwaukee-based Midwest Airlines, which operated out of Mitchell Airport.
- Milwaukee In Space is a presentation for a laser experiment from St. Mary's Hospital that was launched aboard the Space Shuttle Columbia.
- A twenty-two foot model of the LZ 130 Graf Zeppelin II, sister ship of the LZ 129 Hindenburg was on display for many years, but has been moved to the EAA Aviation Museum in Oshkosh as of 2021.

It is operated by The Friends of the Mitchell Gallery of Flight, a non-profit corporation formed to foster and promote the museum and its exhibits.
