= Christen Industries =

- Industry: Aerospace
- Founded: 1972
- Founder: Frank L. Christensen
- Defunct: 1991
- Fate: Acquired by Aviat in 1991 Acquired by Christen Industries in 2025
- Successor: Aviat; Christen Industries
- Headquarters: Middleton, New Hampshire, United States
- Website: christenindustries.com

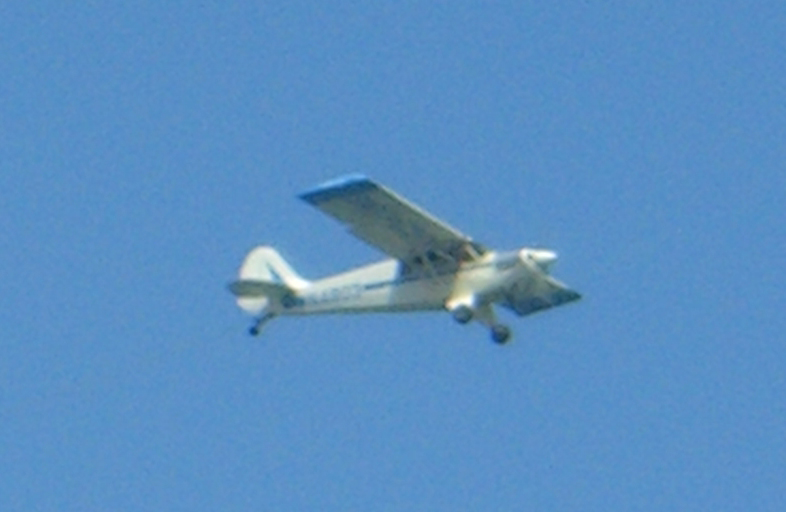
A Christen A-1 Husky.

Christen Industries was an American aircraft manufacturer based in Hollister, California and Afton, Wyoming. As of 2025, Christen Industries is based out of Middleton, New Hampshire.

== History ==
Founded in 1972, the company was created to manufacture the Christen Eagle, designed by Frank L. Christensen after he was unable to acquire the design rights to the Pitts Special. Later that year, a three-man team from the company became the first American team to win the world aerobatic championship. In 1983, the company announced that it acquired the design rights of the Laser 200 designed by Leo Loudenslager.

In 1982, the company acquired Aerotek, moved to Afton, Wyoming and continued production of the Pitts Special alongside the Christen Eagle II kits. The company then designed and manufactured the Christen Husky A-1 utility aircraft. In 1990, the company was the subject of a lawsuit claiming that the design of their aircraft was responsible for the death of a pilot. Christen Industries was, in turn, bought by Aviat Aircraft, Inc. in 1991, who continued both product lines.

In 2025, Chuck Therriault incorporated Christen Industries as a new company and purchased the Christen Eagle II rights from Aviat Aircraft, Inc. According to the new owner, the “[...] vision for Christen Industries is to carry on our amazing Eagle II aircraft with building new kits and parts support, while adding many new mods like carbon, and other lightweight newly designed products to support and modify the Eagle II."

== Aircraft ==
Model name	First flight	Number built	Type
Christen Special			Single engine aerobatic biplane
Christen Eagle II	1977		Single engine aerobatic biplane
Christen Husky	1986		Single engine cabin monoplane
