= Gene Soucy =

American aerobatics pilot

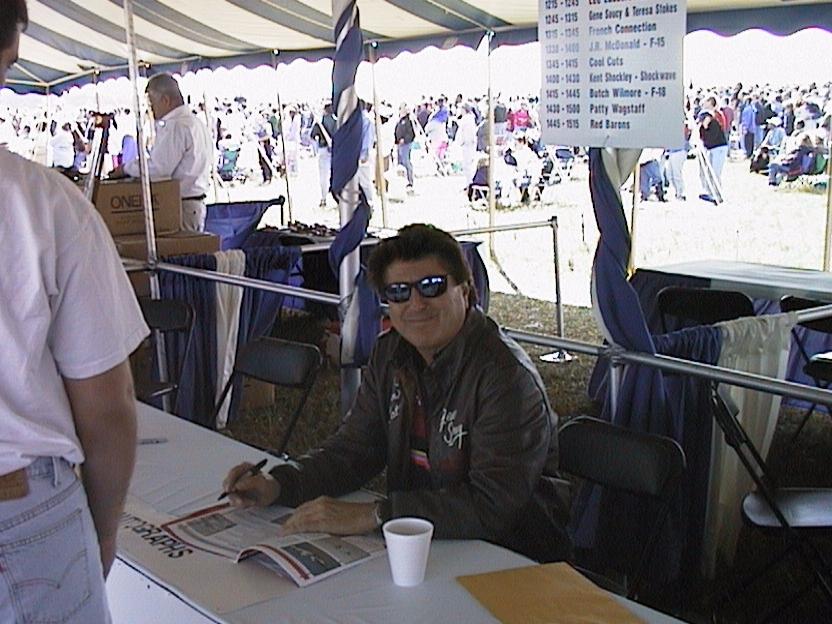
Gene Soucy signing autographs at the 2008 Daytona Skyfest

Gene Soucy is an American aerobatics pilot. The son of two pilots, he would wash airplanes at a local airport in exchange for flight time while growing up in Kentucky. He soloed in a glider at age 14, and in a regular airplane at 16.

Soucy began flying professionally in airshows in 1968, and in 1972 qualified for a place on the U.S. aerobatics team. That year he was the youngest competitor flying at the World championships in England. He placed 6th overall, and contributed to the U.S. team winning the World championship for the first time.

== Eagles Aerobatic Team ==
In 1971, he partnered with Charlie Hillard and Tom Poberezny to form the Red Devils Aerobatic Team, flying the Pitts Special. In 1979, aircraft designer Frank Christensen invited the team to test fly a new aerobatic aircraft he had designed: the Christen Eagle. The Devils were so impressed that they switched their team aircraft to the Eagle, and renamed the Red Devils to the Eagles Aerobatic Team, with Hillard as the lead pilot. The Eagles Aerobatic Team would fly together for more than 25 years, and 1000 performances, setting a record for the longest running aerobatic team with the same members.

== Other acts ==
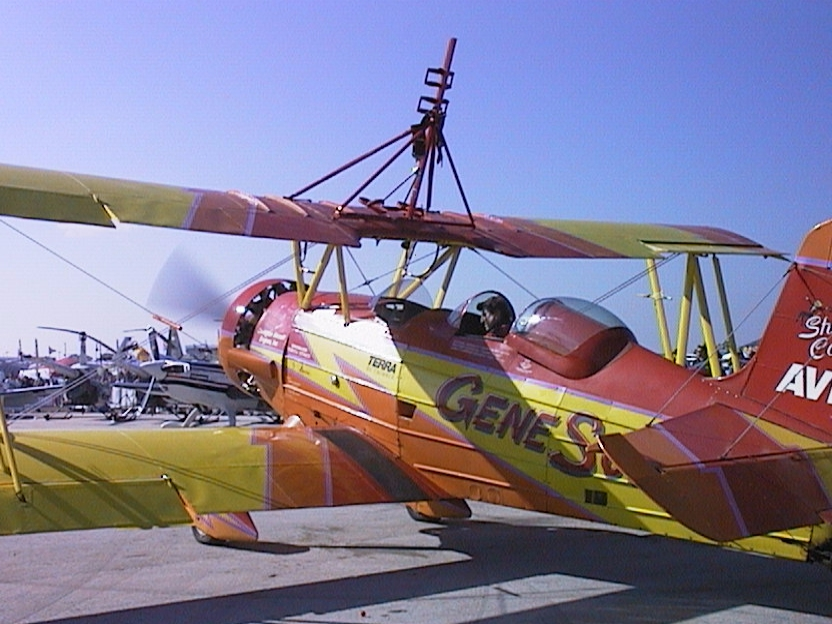
Gene Soucy in the cockpit of his Showcat

During his career with the Eagles, Soucy began to develop a new aircraft to fly in airshows. He had a Grumman Ag Cat cropduster modified for a Wing walking act, and named the aircraft the Showcat. His partner and girlfriend Teresa Stokes performs as the wing walker while Soucy takes the Showcat through various aerobatic maneuvers. The Showcat is also configured with pyrotechnics, used as part of a nighttime aerobatic show. After the Eagles team disbanded in 1995, Soucy began performing solo aerobatic in an Extra 300S, in addition to his Showcat performances.

== Personal life ==
In 2002, he began to show signs of kidney disease, and in 2003 underwent a kidney transplant. Teresa Stokes was the donor, after Soucy's siblings proved to not be able to donate. He was back flying at airshows 3 months after the operation.

Soucy has also flown as a stunt pilot for several motion pictures and TV movies. His credits include Aces: Iron Eagle III, where he flew with Charlie Hillard, and The Pancho Barnes Story.

Soucy has two daughters, and lives in Houston, Texas. In addition to his airshow performances, he is a pilot with Delta Air Lines.

== See also ==
- Competition aerobatics
- FAI World Aerobatic Championships
- FAI European Aerobatic Championships
