= Nesmith Cougar =

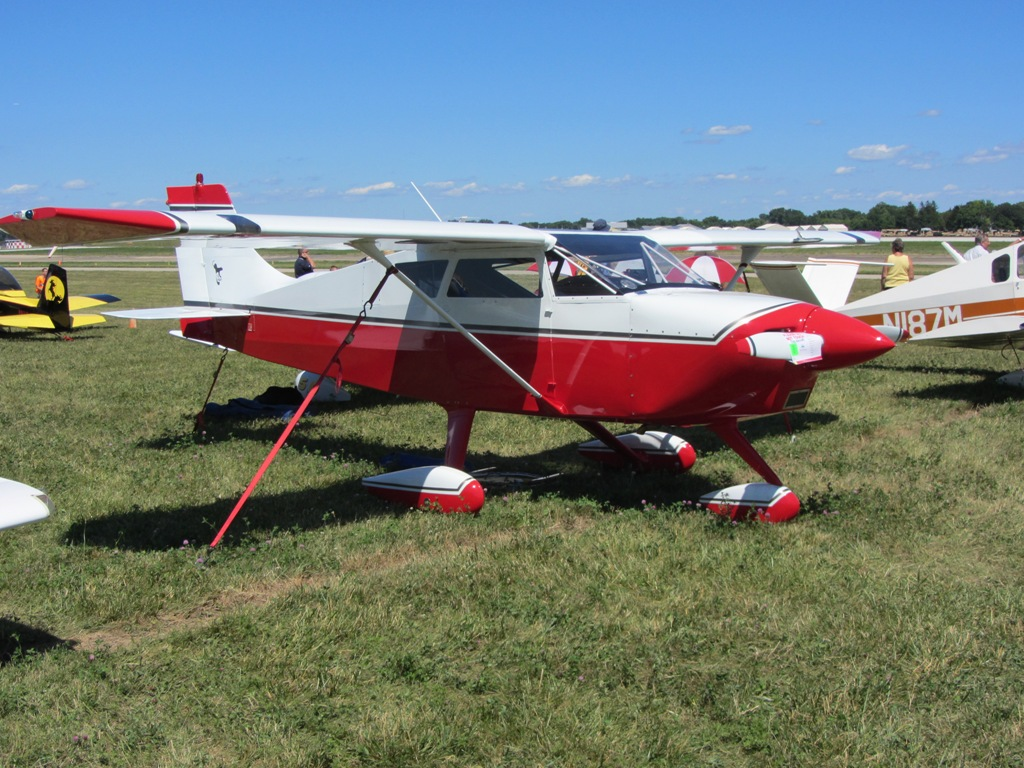

General information
- Type: Recreational aircraft
- Manufacturer: Homebuilt
- Designer: Bob Nesmith

History
- Introduction date: 1957
- First flight: 1957
- Variant: Eaves Cougar 1

The Nesmith Cougar is a light aircraft that was developed in the United States in the 1950s and marketed for homebuilding.

== Development ==
The design, by Robert Nesmith, is a conventional high-wing, strut-braced monoplane with fixed tailwheel undercarriage. The pilot and a single passenger were seated side by side. The fuselage and empennage were of welded steel-tube construction, while the wings were of wood, and the whole aircraft was fabric-covered. Some later aircraft were fitted with a tricycle undercarriage.

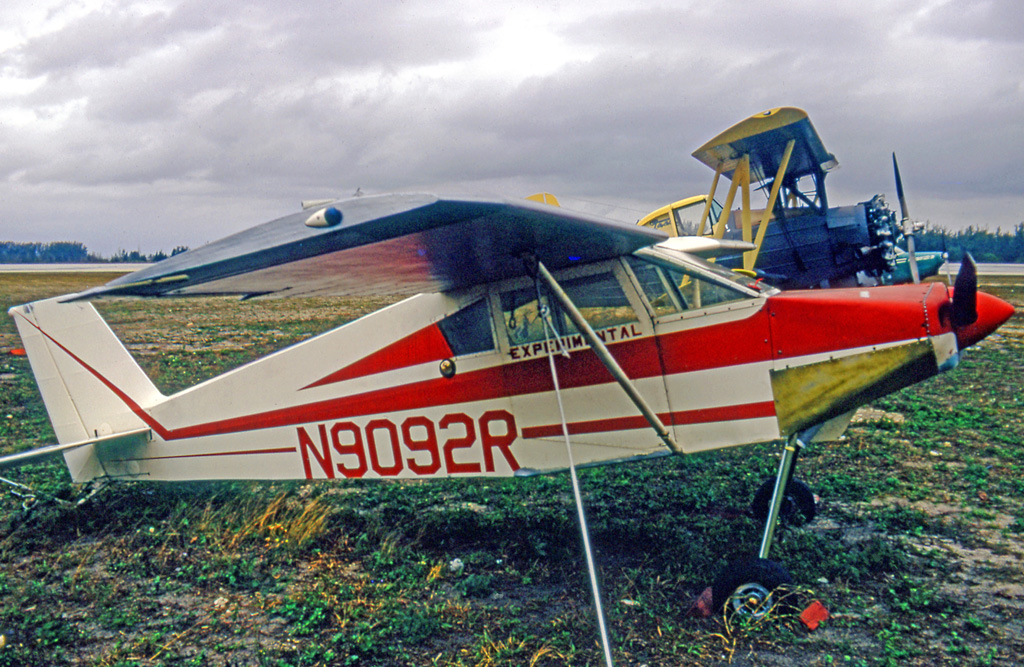
Cougar fitted with conventional tailwheel undercarriage

The original Cougar design was marketed by Nesmith himself. His intent was to market a low-cost aircraft for homebuilders. He also used the aircraft as a troubled youth project to encourage teens to work together toward a goal. When a modified Cougar won an Experimental Aircraft Association (EAA) design competition in 1963, that organization took over selling plans. Rights to the design were eventually purchased by Acro Sport.

The aircraft shape was influenced by the Beechcraft Staggerwing and Wittman Tailwind. The name came from the college of Nesmith's daughter, the University of Houston, whose athletic mascot is a cougar.

== Variants ==
Nesmith M1 Cougar
The original design for home building. Powered by 108hp Lycoming.
Nesmith Cougar Comet
Cougar modified with a 125hp Lycoming O-290D.
Nesmith Chigger & Landoll's Skydoll
One example was built with folding wings and Culver Cadet landing gear, called the "Chigger". Another example built with folding wings with automatic control latching. Both aircraft are capable of being towed backwards behind a car.

== Specifications (typical) ==
Data from Jane's All the World's Aircraft 1961–62

General characteristics

- Crew: 1
- Capacity: 1 passenger
- Length: 18 ft 11 in (5.77 m)
- Wingspan: 20 ft 6 in (6.25 m)
- Height: 5 ft 6 in (1.68 m)
- Wing area: 82.5 sq ft (7.66 m^{2})
- Aspect ratio: 5.16:1
- Airfoil: NACA 4309 (modified)
- Empty weight: 624 lb (283 kg)
- Gross weight: 1,250 lb (567 kg)
- Fuel capacity: 25 US gal (21 imp gal; 95 L)
- Powerplant: 1 × Lycoming O-235 air-cooled flat-four engine, 115 hp (86 kW)

Performance

- Maximum speed: 195 mph (314 km/h, 169 kn)
- Cruise speed: 155 mph (249 km/h, 135 kn) (econ. cruise)
- Stall speed: 53 mph (85 km/h, 46 kn)
- Range: 750 mi (1,210 km, 650 nmi)
- Service ceiling: 13,000 ft (4,000 m)
- Rate of climb: 1,300 ft/min (6.6 m/s)
- Takeoff distance to 50 ft (15 m): 1,100 ft (340 m)
- Landing distance from 50 ft (15 m): 1,000 ft (300 m)

== See also ==
Aircraft of comparable role, configuration, and era

- Bede BD-4
- Wittman Tailwind
- Wittman Buttercup
- Szaraz SDS-1A Daphne
- Hanson Woodwind
- Scott Ol' Ironsides
