= Wittman DFA =

DFA
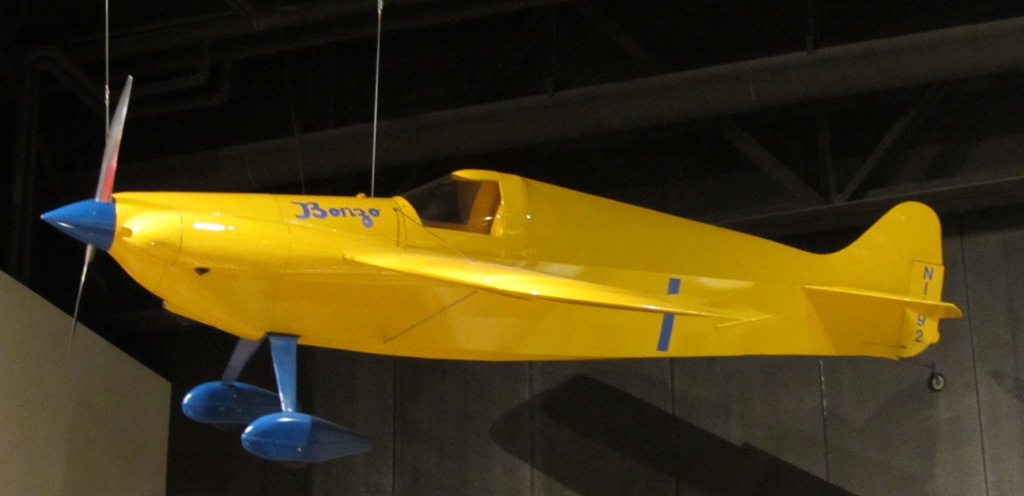
- Wittman DFA "Little Bonzo"

General information
- Type: Racing aircraft
- National origin: United States of America
- Designer: Steve Wittman, Bill Brennand
- Number built: 1

History
- First flight: 16 July 1948
- Variant: Wittman Buster

The Wittman DFA aka Little Bonzo is a homebuilt racing aircraft designed to compete in midget racing.

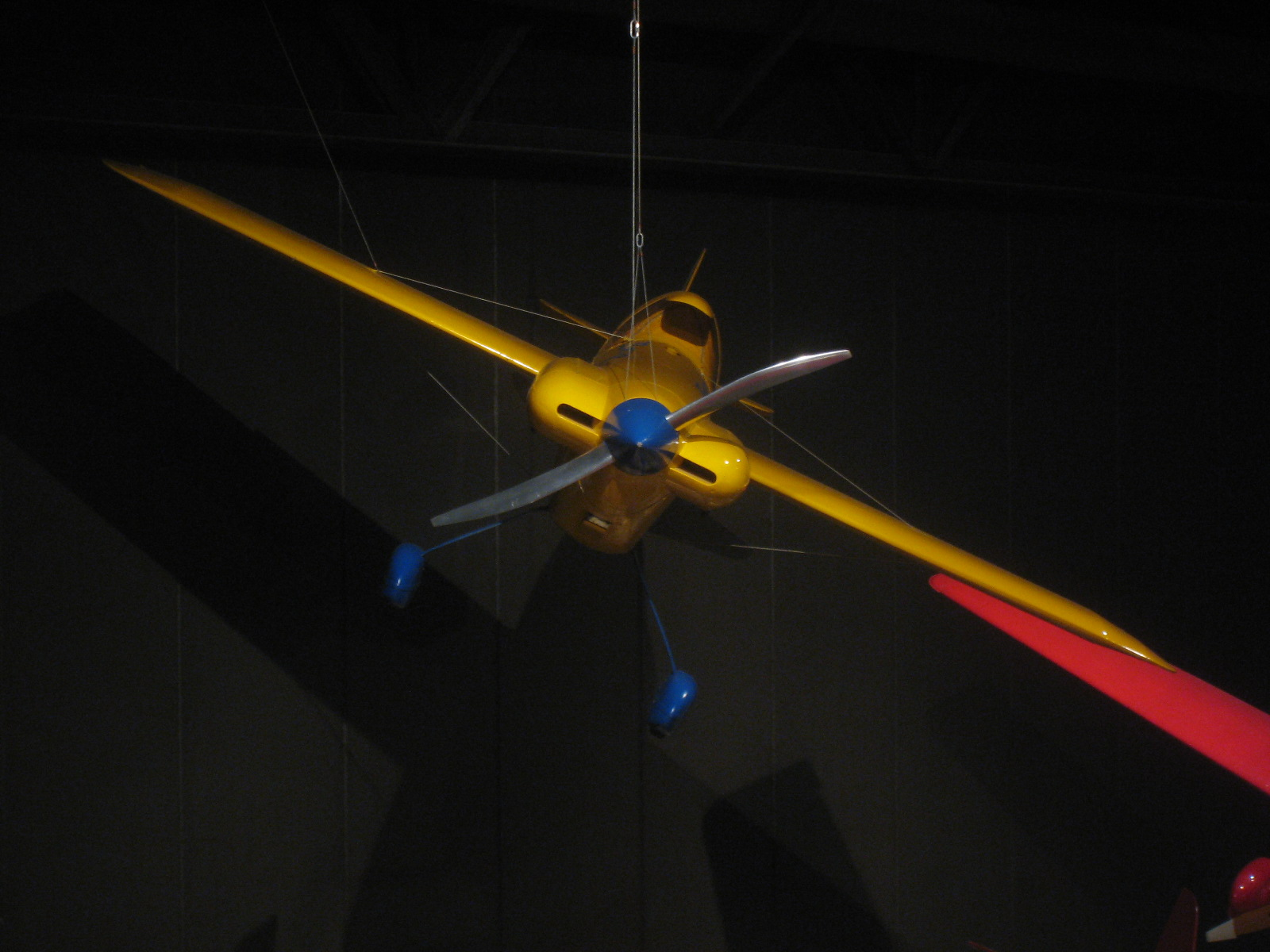
Little Bonzo on display

== Development ==
Steve Wittman had started air racing in 1926 using various aircraft. In March 1931, he designed his own purpose-built aircraft in Oshkosh, Wisconsin, the Wittman Chief Oshkosh. After World War II, a new class of Midget air racing was formed with Wittman's efforts. Wittman re-engined "Chief Oshkosh" and renamed it "Bonzo". After several successful races in Cleveland in 1948, a cleaner sister ship "Little Bonzo" was built. The name is a reference to Wittman's much larger racer, the Wittman D-12 Bonzo.

== Design ==
The Wittman DFA is a mid-winged conventional geared aircraft built from a welded steel tube fuselage with aircraft fabric covering and wooden wing construction. The DFA differs slightly from Bonzo with a smaller tail surface, a longer tail and a larger canopy. In 1968, the engine was replaced with a Continental O-200 to compete under new race rules.

== Operational history ==
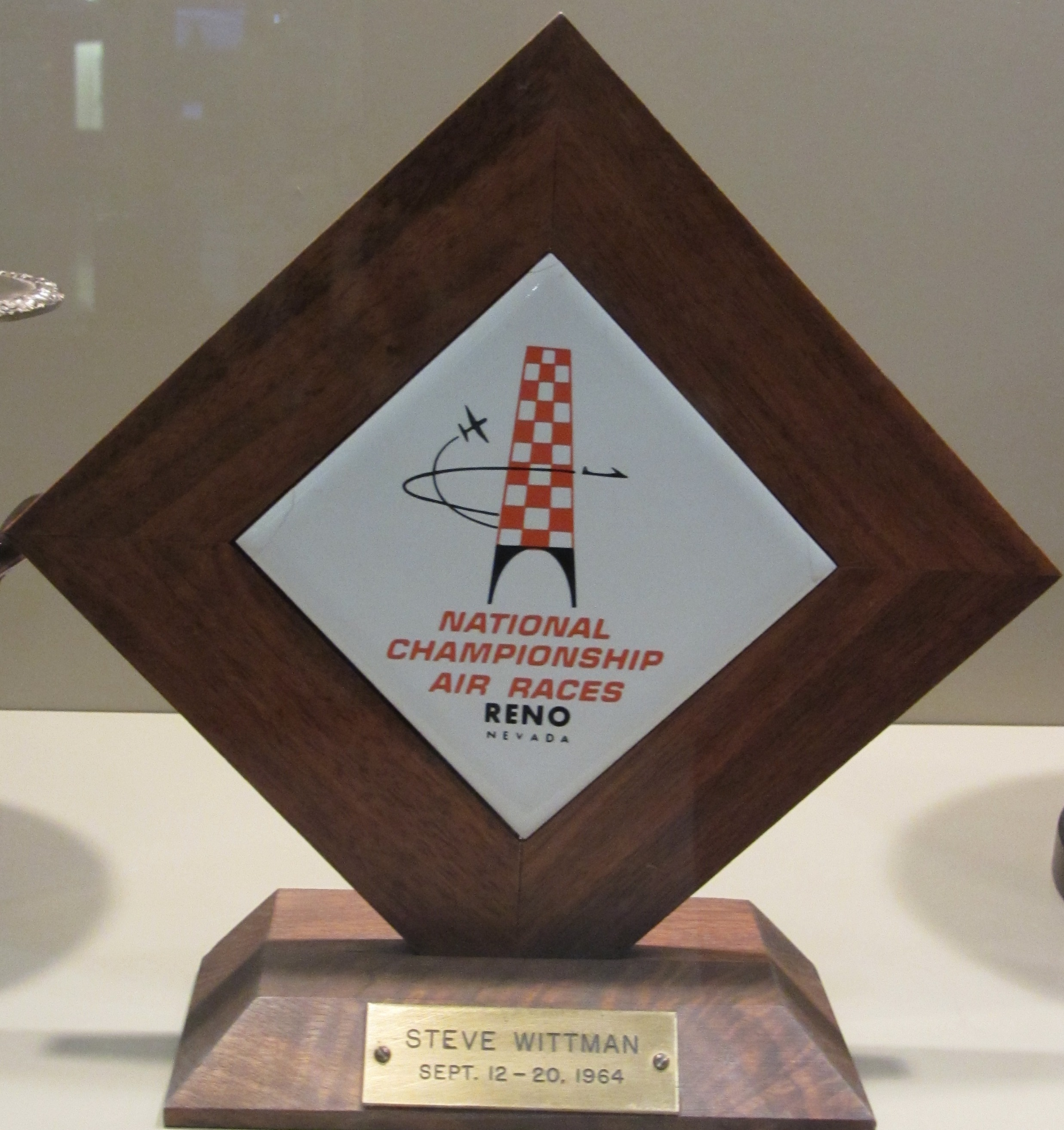
Wittman 1964 Reno National Air Race Plaque

Steve Wittman and Bill Brennand alternated flying "Buster" and "Little Bonzo". The aircraft was never transported by trailer and was instead always flown to events, where Wittman would perform aerobatics between heats in his racing aircraft.

- 1948 National Air Races - Cleveland pilot Wittman placed second.
- 1949 Continental Trophy races - first place
- 1950 Rebat Trophy - first place
- 1951 Rebat Trophy - first place
- 1952 Continental Trophy races - first place
- 1964 Reno Formula One Championship - second place
- 1973 Goodyear race - the last competitive race for Little Bonzo.
- 1994 Wittman flew the newly restored aircraft before it was donated to the EAA museum.

== Variants ==
- The 1934 Wittman Buster rebuilt from "Chief Oshkosh" was the basis for Little Bonzo.

== Aircraft on display ==
The Wittman DFA is on display at the EAA Airventure Museum in Oshkosh, Wisconsin.

== Specifications (Wittman DFA "Little Bonzo") ==
Data from Sport Aviation

General characteristics

- Capacity: 1
- Length: 19 ft (5.8 m)
- Wingspan: 15 ft 4 in (4.67 m)
- Wing area: 67 sq ft (6.2 m^{2})
- Empty weight: 508 lb (230 kg)
- Fuel capacity: 15 U.S. gallons (57 L; 12 imp gal)
- Powerplant: 1 × Continental C-85 , 100 hp (75 kW)

Performance

- Maximum speed: 204 kn (235 mph, 378 km/h)
- Range: 450 nmi (520 mi, 840 km)

== See also ==
Aircraft of comparable role, configuration, and era

- Cassutt Special
