= Wittman Big X =

Four seat high wing aircraft

General information
- Type: Homebuilt Aircraft
- National origin: United States of America
- Manufacturer: Steve Wittman
- Designer: Steve Wittman
- Number built: 1

History
- Introduction date: 1945
- First flight: January 6, 1945
- Developed from: Wittman Buttercup

The Wittman Big X is a four seat high wing variant of the Wittman Buttercup. The aircraft received serious attention from both Fairchild Aircraft, and Cessna Aircraft in the post World War II aviation boom.

== Development ==
On a cross-country fuel stop at Hagerstown, Maryland, with Wittman's design, the Buttercup, Fairchild engineers expressed an interest in the design and even entered into negotiations for possible production of the aircraft. With the onset of World War II, production plans were shelved, but Fairchild contacted Wittman and proposed that a four-seat version would be marketable. Wittman designed the four-place "Big X" soon afterward.

When Fairchild did not follow up on production offers, Wittman was contacted by Cessna in Wichita, Kansas, to demonstrate the lightweight and strong spring steel landing gear of the Big X. Cessna bought the plane and its production rights in order to use the gear on its new Cessna 195 taildragger. Wittman later produced an updated version in a two-place configuration called the Wittman Tailwind that became a popular homebuilt aircraft.

== Design ==
The Big X was built in the same manner as Buttercup. It was steel tube fuselage with fabric covering and all-wood wings. The original Big X featured a 130 hp Franklin engine, later upgraded to a 150 hp.

== Operational history ==
Big X was used as a companion plane and baggage hauler during Wittman's years as an air racer. The original aircraft was rebuilt by Forrest Lovley in 1980.

== Specifications Wittman Big X ==
Data from Sport Aviation

General characteristics

- Capacity: 4
- Length: 24 ft 10 in (7.57 m)
- Wingspan: 29 ft (8.8 m)
- Empty weight: 1,150 lb (522 kg)
- Gross weight: 2,200 lb (998 kg)
- Fuel capacity: 36
- Powerplant: 1 × Franklin 6A4-150-B3 , 150 hp (110 kW)

Performance

- Cruise speed: 130 kn (150 mph, 240 km/h)
- Stall speed: 48 kn (55 mph, 89 km/h)
- Rate of climb: 900 ft/min (4.6 m/s)
