= Szaraz SDS-1A Daphne =

SD-1A Daphne
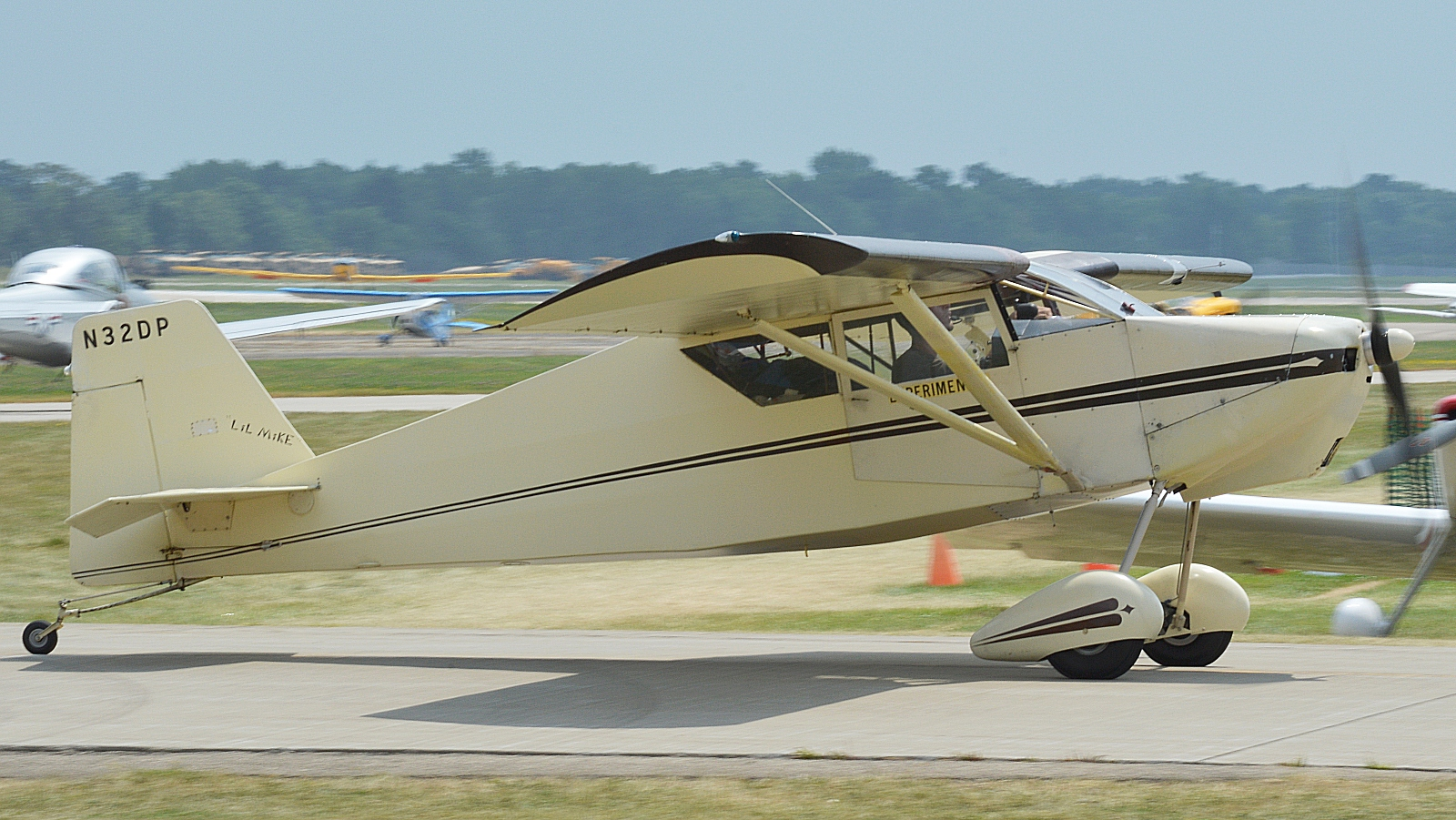

General information
- Type: Homebuilt aircraft
- National origin: United States
- Designer: Arpad "Art" Szaraz, Bernie Darmstadt
- Number built: 22

History
- First flight: 1965

The Daphne SD-1A is a homebuilt aircraft that won second place in the 1970 EAA AirVenture Oshkosh flight efficiency contest.

== Design ==
The Daphne is a two place, side-by-side configuration, strut-braced, high-wing, conventional landing gear equipped homebuilt. The fuselage is constructed of welded chromoly steel tubing, while the wings are made of wood, with one-piece plywood ribs. The entire structure is covered in aircraft fabric covering. Both ailerons and flaperons have been installed on the design. Hoerner wingtips were utilized, due to their inherent higher efficiency and low-drag features. Szaraz drew heavily from the design of the Wittman W-8 Tailwind during the design process, and thus the fuselage, landing gear, and engine mount are very similar to that of the W-8. Plans were first offered for sale in the March 1969 edition of Sport Aviation. In 1971, the plans were priced at $65, while the info packet was $2.

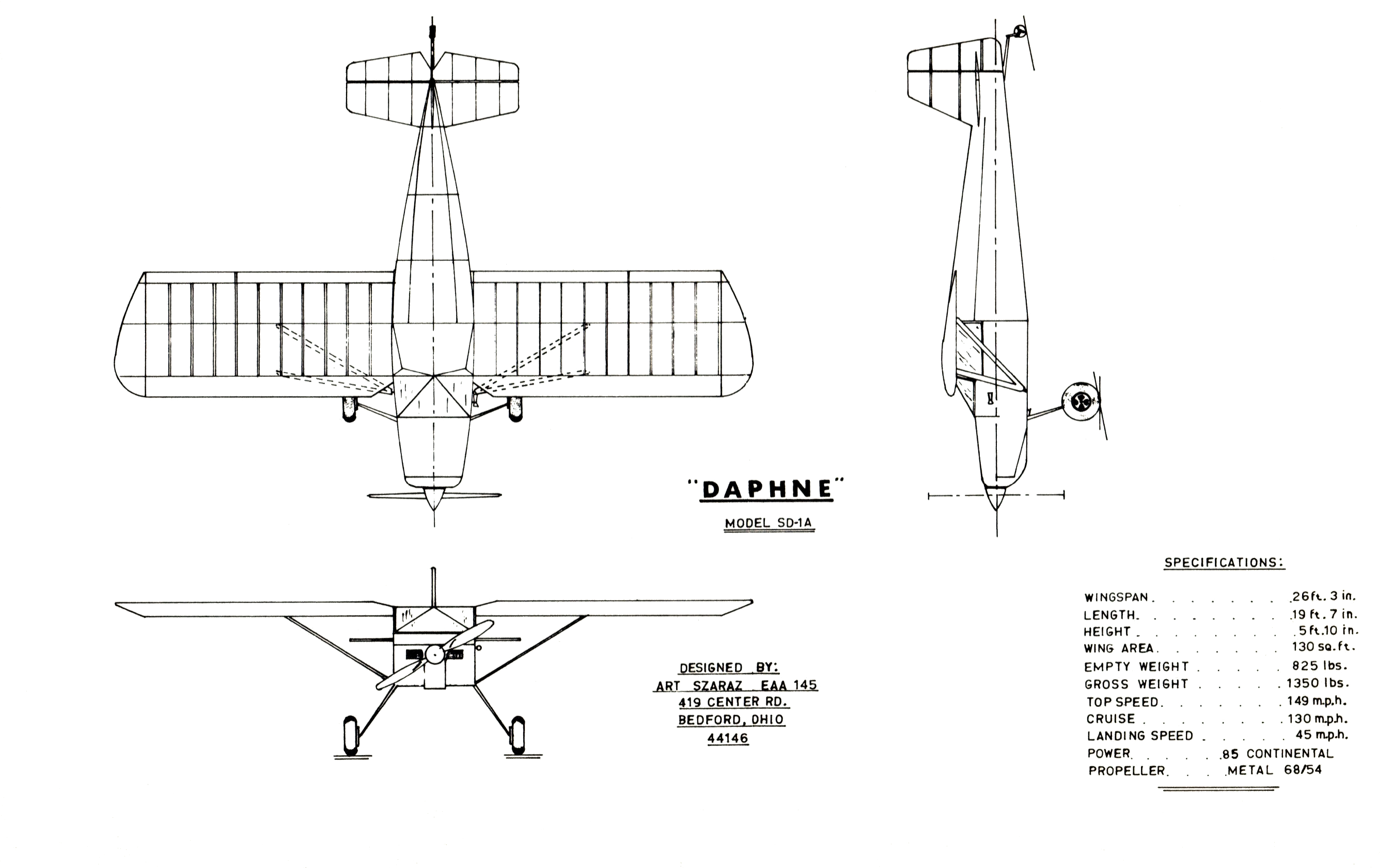
Three dimensional view of the Daphne SD-1A aircraft

== Operational history ==
The first three examples were built on the same jigs at Bernie Darmstadt's workshop basement. According to Jane's AWA, by January 1970, at least 26 were under construction. As of December 2023, there were 7 active Daphnes registered on the Federal Aviation Administration database, with 3 additional ones in Canada.

== Specifications (SD-1A Daphne) ==
Data from Sport Aviation.

General characteristics

- Capacity: 2
- Length: 19 ft 7 in (5.97 m)
- Wingspan: 26 ft (7.9 m)
- Wing area: 130 sq ft (12 m^{2})
- Airfoil: NACA 4412
- Empty weight: 820 lb (372 kg)
- Gross weight: 1,300 lb (590 kg)
- Fuel capacity: 21 US gal (79 L)
- Powerplant: 1 × Continental C85-12F or Lycoming O-235/O-290 , 85–135 hp (63–101 kW)
- Propellers: 2-bladed

Performance

- Maximum speed: 130 kn (150 mph, 240 km/h)
- Cruise speed: 100 kn (120 mph, 190 km/h)
- Stall speed: 35 kn (40 mph, 64 km/h)
- Never exceed speed: 150 kn (170 mph, 270 km/h)
- Range: 390 nmi (450 mi, 720 km)
- Service ceiling: 14,500 ft (4,400 m)
- Rate of climb: 1,000 ft/min (5.1 m/s)

== See also ==
Aircraft of comparable role, configuration, and era

- Wittman Tailwind
- Wittman Buttercup
- Nesmith Cougar
- Vidervol VS-1
