= Southern Aeronautical Corporation =

American aircraft manufacturer

- Company type: Privately held company
- Industry: Aerospace
- Founded: January 26, 1968
- Fate: Inactive since 1981
- Headquarters: Miami Lakes, Florida, United States
- Key people: Charles W. Lasher, President, Director; John W. Lasher, Treasurer, Director; Helen B. Lasher, Director, Secretary
- Products: Aircraft plans

Southern Aeronautical Corporation was an American aircraft manufacturer, founded by Charles Lasher and based in Miami Lakes, Florida. The company specialized in the design of Formula V Air Racing aircraft for amateur construction.

The company was formed as a Florida Domestic for Profit Corporation on 26 January 1968 and listed Charles W. Lasher as President and Director; John W. Lasher as Treasurer and Director and Helen B. Lasher as Director and Secretary. The company status in 2013 was "inactive" as its last legal report filing was in 1981.

== Aircraft ==
Summary of aircraft designed by Southern Aeronautical Corporation
Model name	First flight	Number built	Type
Southern Aeronautical Scamp	1960s		Mid-wing Formula V air racer
Southern Aeronautical Renegade	1970s		Mid-wing Formula V air racer
