= Grosso Aircraft Easy Eagle 1 =

Easy Eagle

General information
- Type: Biplane
- National origin: United States of America
- Manufacturer: Great Plains Aircraft Supply Company
- Designer: Ron Grosso

History
- Introduction date: 1998

The Great Plains Aircraft Easy Eagle is a single seat homebuilt biplane, powered by a Volkswagen air-cooled engine.

== Design and development ==
The Grosso Aircraft Easy Eagle 1 was designed by Ron Grosso, and the production rights were sold to Great Plains Aircraft Supply Company.

The Easy Eagle 1 is built with a steel tube fuselage that is fabric covered. The wings are all wooden construction. It uses the same one piece, all-aluminum landing gear as the Monnett Sonerai.

The Easy Eagle is built from plans; there is no kit available, although Great Plains supplies some sub-assemblies. The estimated time to complete the aircraft from the plans is 300-500 hours.

== Variants ==
Grosso Aircraft Easy Eagle 2
Two seat version

== Specifications (Easy Eagle) ==
Data from Great Plains

General characteristics

- Crew: 1
- Length: 14 ft 4 in (4.37 m)
- Wingspan: 18 ft 4 in (5.59 m)
- Wing area: 90 sq ft (8.4 m^{2})
- Empty weight: 454 lb (206 kg)
- Fuel capacity: 12 U.S. gallons (45 L; 10.0 imp gal)
- Powerplant: 1 × Great Plains Type 1 Front Drive Volkswagen air-cooled engine flat-4, 65 hp (48 kW)

Performance

- Cruise speed: 83 kn (95 mph, 153 km/h)
- Stall speed: 39 kn (45 mph, 72 km/h)
- Rate of climb: 700 ft/min (3.6 m/s)
