= Wittman V-Witt =

V-Witt
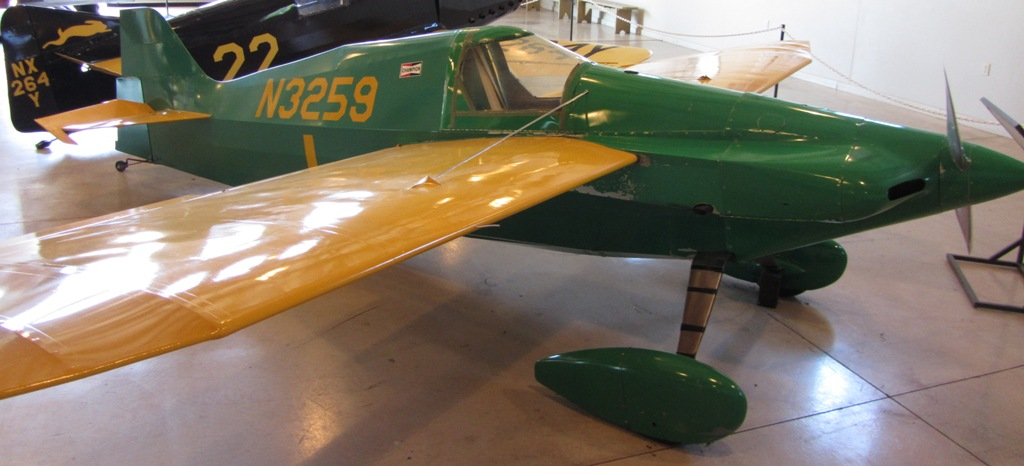
- Witts V on display

General information
- Type: Formula V Racer
- National origin: United States
- Manufacturer: Steve Wittman
- Designer: Steve Wittman
- Primary user: Air racer

History
- Introduction date: 1970
- First flight: October 28, 1970

The Wittman V-Witt also called Witts V and Witt's Vee is single-engine tube-and-fabric construction aircraft specifically made for Formula V Air Racing.

== Design ==
The aircraft is made of welded steel tube fuselage with fabric covering. The thin-profile wings are wire-supported. The engine requires a 12-inch extension to mount the propeller ahead of a streamlined cowling.

== Operational history ==
The Witts V was flown in races and demonstrations from 1972 to 1981.

The prototype aircraft is on display at the EAA Airventure Museum in Oshkosh, Wisconsin.

== Specifications (Wittman V-Witt) ==
Data from Berliner

General characteristics

- Crew: 1
- Length: 18 ft 2 in (5.54 m)
- Wingspan: 17 ft 6 in (5.33 m)
- Height: 4 ft 2 in (1.27 m)
- Wing area: 75 sq ft (7.0 m^{2}) (original square tips)
- Empty weight: 430 lb (195 kg)
- Gross weight: 700 lb (318 kg)
- Fuel capacity: 10.25 gallons
- Powerplant: 1 × 1600 Volkswagen air-cooled engine

Performance

- Maximum speed: 143 kn (165 mph, 266 km/h)
- Stall speed: 40 kn (46 mph, 74 km/h)
- Range: 350 nmi (400 mi, 640 km)
- Service ceiling: 15,000 ft (4,600 m)

Triangular wing tips brought the span to 20 ft.(EAA Museum web site)

== See also ==
Aircraft of comparable role, configuration, and era

- Monnett Sonerai
