= Great Plains Type 1 Front Drive =

American aircraft engine

Type 1 Front Drive
- Type: Aircraft engine
- National origin: United States
- Manufacturer: Great Plains Aviation Supply

The Great Plains Type 1 Front Drive is an American aircraft engine series, produced by Great Plains Aviation Supply of Bennington, Nebraska for use in homebuilt aircraft. The series are all based upon the Volkswagen air-cooled automotive engine.

== Design and development ==
The engine series are all four-cylinder four-stroke, horizontally-opposed, air-cooled, Volkswagen automotive conversion gasoline engines, with direct-drive. They employ magneto ignition systems and, depending on the model, produce 55 to 80 hp (41 to 60 kW) at 3600 rpm, with a compression ratio of 8.0:1. They use a geared electric starter.

The series includes six models, named for their displacement:

- 1,600 cc (97.6 cu in) producing 55 hp (41 kW) for take-off
- 1,700 cc (103.7 cu in) producing 60 hp (45 kW) for take-off
- 1,835 cc (112.0 cu in) producing 65 hp (48 kW) for take-off
- 1,915 cc (116.9 cu in) producing 69 hp (51 kW) for take-off
- 2,180 cc (133.0 cu in) producing 76 hp (57 kW) for take-off
- 2,276 cc (138.9 cu in) producing 80 hp (60 kW) for take-off.

== Applications ==
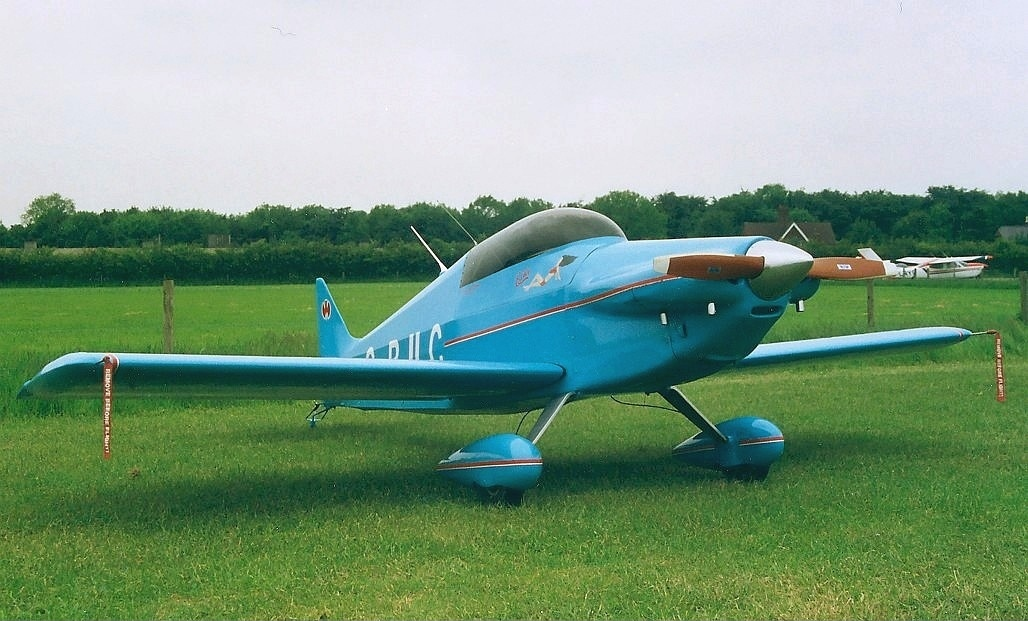
Monnett Sonerai IIL

- Grosso Aircraft Easy Eagle 1
- Monnett Sonerai

== Specifications (Type 1 Front Drive 2180) ==
Data from Tacke and manufacturer

=== General characteristics ===
- Type: Four cylinder, four stroke aircraft engine
- Bore: 92 mm (3.6 in)
- Stroke: 82 mm (3.2 in)
- Displacement: 2,180 cc (133.0 cu in)
- Dry weight: 74.6 kg (164.5 lb)

=== Components ===
- Fuel type: gasoline
- Cooling system: air
- Reduction gear: none

=== Performance ===
- Power output: 76 hp (57 kW) for takeoff, 70 hp (52 kW) comtinous
- Compression ratio: 8.0:1

== See also ==
Related lists

- List of aircraft engines
