= Southern Aeronautical Renegade =

American homebuilt aircraft

Renegade

General information
- Type: Homebuilt air racer
- National origin: United States
- Manufacturer: Southern Aeronautical Corporation
- Designer: Charles Lasher
- Status: Plans no longer available

The Southern Aeronautical Renegade is an American Formula V Air Racing homebuilt aircraft that was designed by Charles Lasher and produced by Southern Aeronautical Corporation of Miami Lakes, Florida. The aircraft was supplied in the form of plans for amateur construction, but the plans are apparently no longer available.

== Design and development ==
The aircraft features a cantilever mid-wing, a single-seat enclosed cockpit under a bubble canopy, fixed conventional landing gear and a single engine in tractor configuration.

The aircraft fuselage is made from welded steel tubing, which Lasher chose for its superior crash survivability. Its mid-mounted wing has a wooden structure covered in doped aircraft fabric and spans 16 ft (4.9 m). As the Formula V class demands, the aircraft is powered by 35 to 65 hp (26 to 48 kW) Volkswagen air-cooled engine, which gives it a top level speed of 150 mph (241 km/h) and a cruise speed of 125 mph (201 km/h).

The aircraft has an empty weight of 400 lb (180 kg) and a gross weight of 700 lb (320 kg), giving a useful load of 300 lb (140 kg). With full fuel of 10 U.S. gallons (38 L; 8.3 imp gal) the payload is 240 lb (110 kg).

== Specifications (Renegade) ==
Data from Plane and Pilot

General characteristics

- Crew: one
- Length: 14 ft 0 in (4.27 m)
- Wingspan: 16 ft 0 in (4.88 m)
- Empty weight: 400 lb (181 kg)
- Gross weight: 700 lb (318 kg)
- Fuel capacity: 10 U.S. gallons (38 L; 8.3 imp gal)
- Powerplant: 1 × Volkswagen air-cooled engine four cylinder, air-cooled, four stroke automotive conversion engine, 65 hp (48 kW)
- Propellers: 2-bladed wooden

Performance

- Maximum speed: 150 mph (240 km/h, 130 kn)
- Cruise speed: 125 mph (201 km/h, 109 kn)
- Stall speed: 39 mph (63 km/h, 34 kn)
- Range: 375 mi (604 km, 326 nmi)
- Rate of climb: 1,000 ft/min (5.1 m/s)
