= Steve Wittman =

American aviator

- Born: Sylvester Joseph Wittman; April 5, 1904; Byron, Wisconsin
- Died: April 27, 1995 (aged 91); Stevenson, Alabama
- Cause of death: Plane crash
- Other name: "Witt"
- Education: Fond du Lac High School
- Known for: Air racing
- Spouse(s): Dorothy Rady, Paula Muir

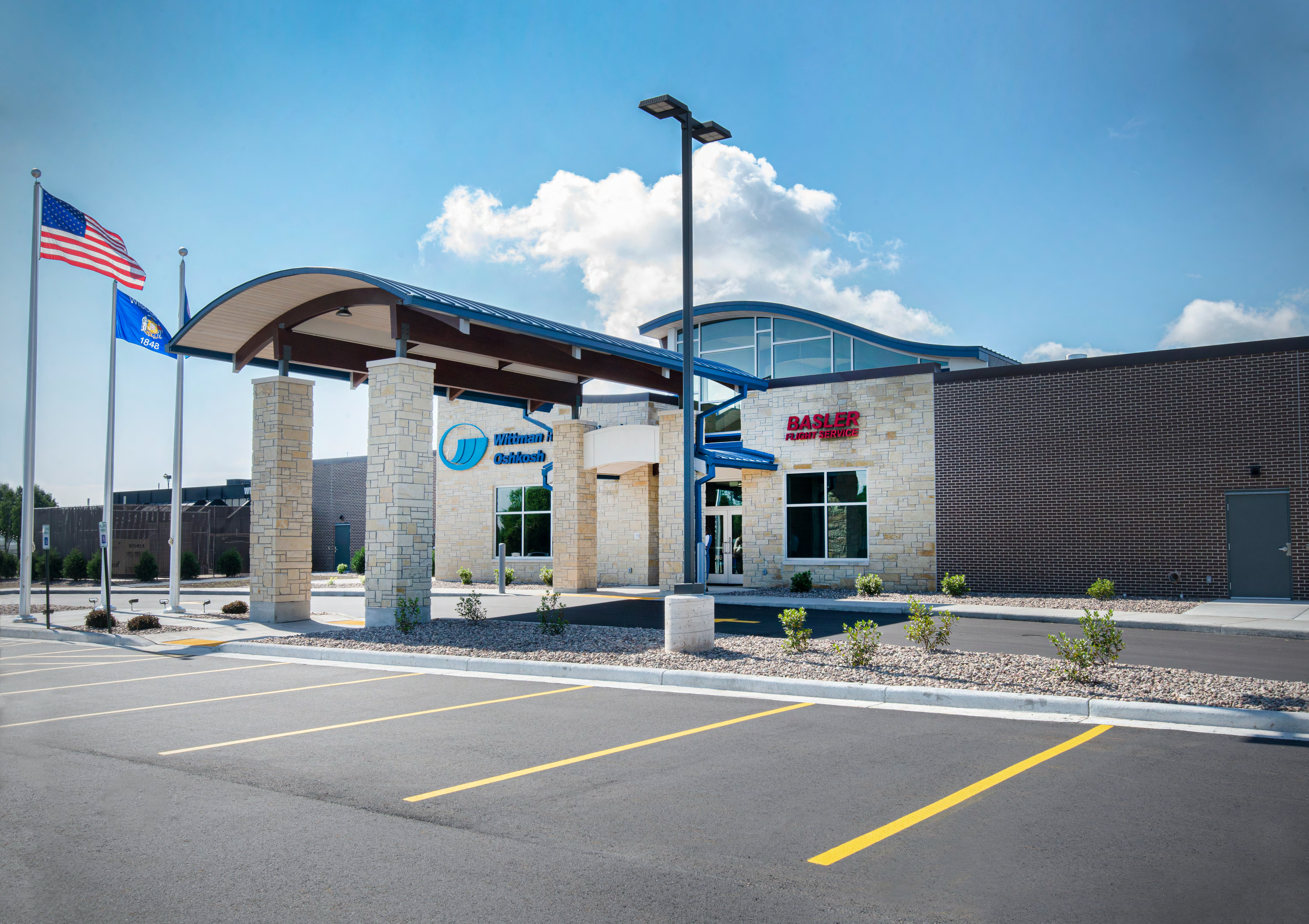
Wittman Regional Airport

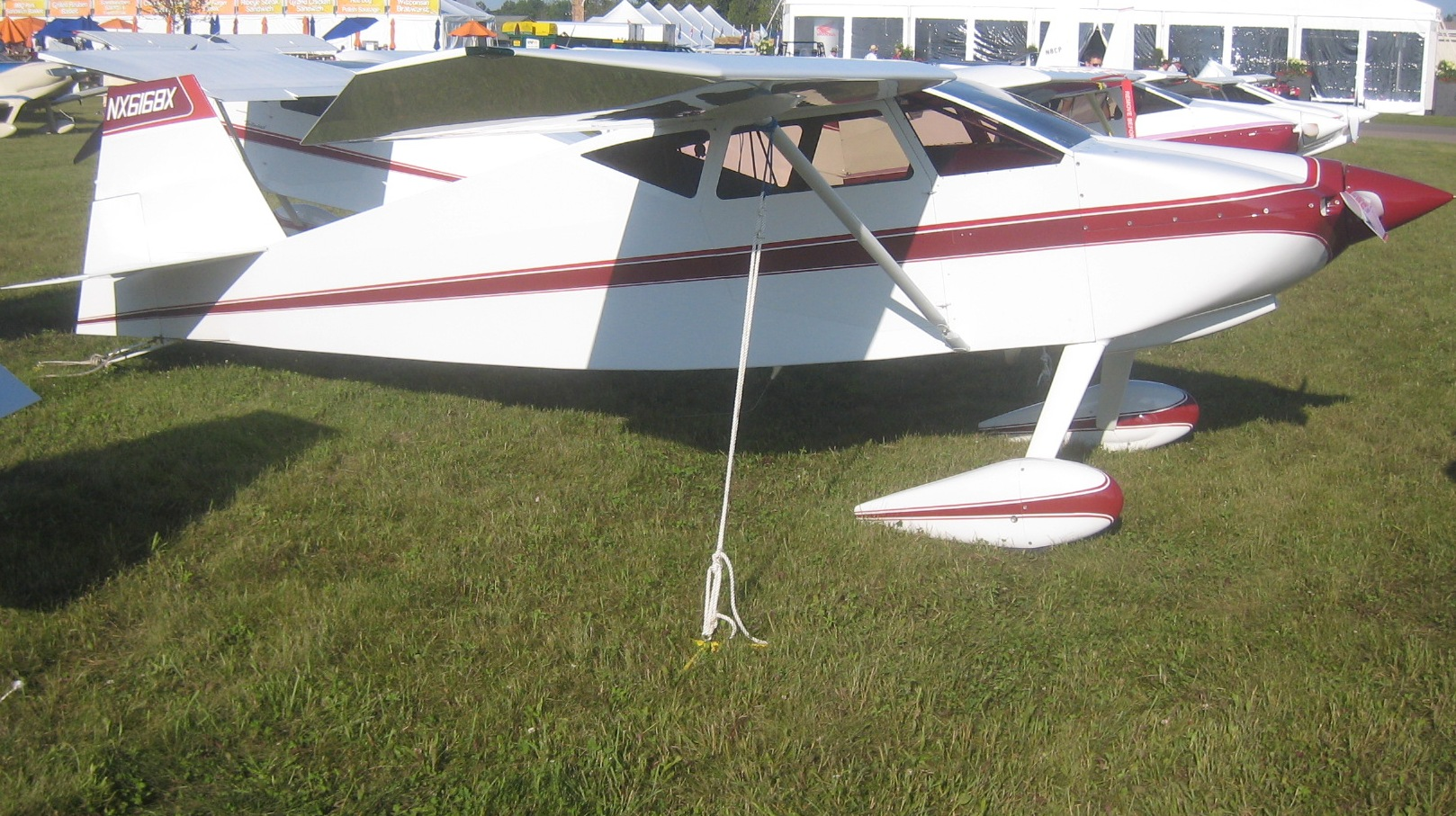
Wittman Tailwind (W-10) built by Jim Clement

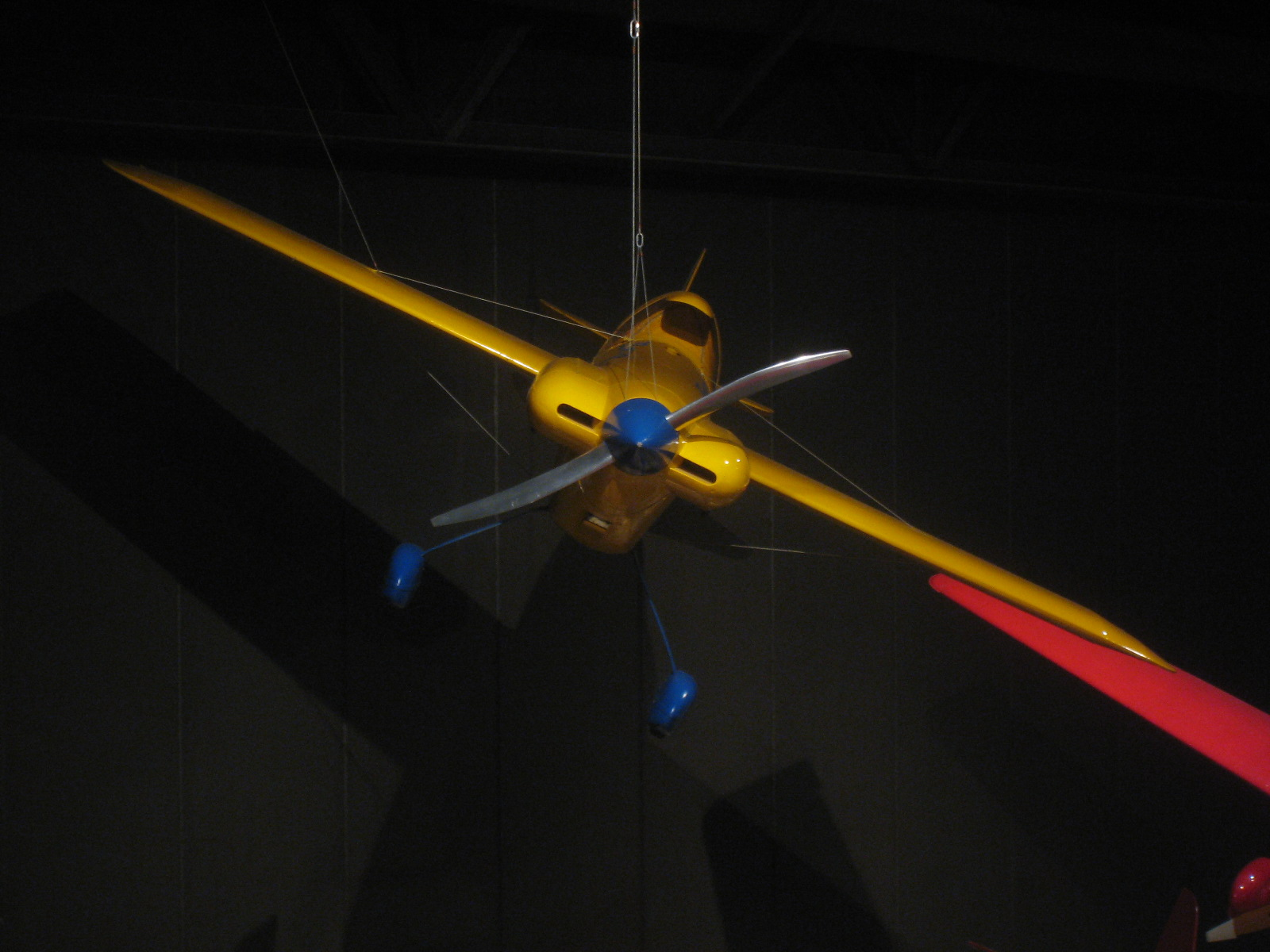
Wittman DFA Racer

Sylvester Joseph "Steve" Wittman (April 5, 1904 – April 27, 1995) was an American air-racer and amateur aircraft engineer.

An illness in Wittman's infancy claimed most of his vision in one eye, which convinced him from an early age that his dream of flying was unattainable. However, he learned how to fly in 1924 in a Standard J-1 and built his first aircraft, the Harley-powered "Hardly Abelson" in late 1924. From 1925 to 1927, he had his own flying service, offering joyrides, and during this time also became a demonstration and test pilot for The Pheasant Aircraft Company and the Dayton Aircraft Company, flying the Pheasant H-10 in multiple events. He also began his air-racing career, flying his first race in 1926 at a Milwaukee event in his J-1.

After competing in his first transcontinental air race from New York to Los Angeles in 1928, he attained a medical waiver on his eyesight and received his pilot's certificate soon after (signed by Orville Wright). He then went on to design, build and pilot his own aircraft, including "Chief Oshkosh" in 1931 and "Bonzo" in 1934. Wittman's first race in an aircraft he had designed was in "Bonzo", in the 1935 Thompson Trophy race, where he placed second.

In 1937, piloting his second homebuilt, "Chief Oshkosh", Wittman placed second in the Greve Trophy Race. Wittman flew "Bonzo" in the Thompson Trophy race, and he led for the first 18 laps of the 20 lap race, at an average speed of over 275 mph (442.57 km/h). Suddenly his engine began to run rough, and Wittman was forced to throttle back to remain in the race, finishing in 5th place. In 1938, he was awarded the Louis Blériot medal by the Fédération Aéronautique Internationale (FAI).

Also in 1937, Wittman designed and built "Buttercup". A high wing design built to outperform the Cubs, Chiefs, T-Crafts, and Luscombes of the day. Based on that aircraft, he built the Wittman Big X in 1945, and the popular Wittman Tailwind series of homebuilts.

During World War II, his Wittman Flying Service was part of the Civilian Pilot Training Program, training pilots for the Army Air Corps.

After the war, Wittman finished eighth in the 1946 Thompson Trophy race with a clipped-wing Bell P-63 Kingcobra fighter. In 1947, Bill Brennand won the inaugural Goodyear class race at the National Air Races piloting Wittman's 'Buster'. "Buster" was a rebuild of the pre-war "Chief Oshkosh", went on to win many more Goodyear/Continental Trophy races, and was retired after the 1954 Dansville, New York air races. It is now on display at the National Air and Space Museum in Washington, D.C.

Wittman built an entirely new "Bonzo" for the 1948 National Air Races, where he flew it, finishing third. Wittman raced "Bonzo" through the 1950s and 1960s, including the first few Reno National Championship air races, before retiring from Formula One competition in 1973. "Bonzo" is now displayed next to Wittman's prewar "Bonzo" in the EAA Aviation Museum, along with several other Wittman airplanes.

Wittman was manager of the Oshkosh, Wisconsin, airport from 1931 to 1969, which is now named after him (Wittman Regional Airport). Wittman became involved in the newly formed Experimental Aircraft Association in 1953 and was instrumental in bringing the EAA's annual fly-in to the Oshkosh Airport in 1970.

He designed and built the Wittman V-Witt to compete in the new Formula V Air Racing class. He competed in races with that aircraft until 1979. Winners of the Formula V National Championship are presented with the Steve Wittman Trophy.

Wittman remained active in aviation his entire life. For Wittman's 90th birthday celebration, he demonstrated aerobatic maneuvers in his V-Witt and Oldsmobile-powered Tailwind. He also used "Buttercup" to give Young Eagles flights. Letters of appreciation were given by US President Bill Clinton and Wisconsin Governor Tommy Thompson.

Steve married Dorothy Rady in 1941. He taught her to fly and she accompanied him to most of his races. Dorothy died in 1991 and Wittman married Paula Muir in 1992. On April 27, 1995, Wittman and Muir took off for a routine cross-country flight from their winter residence in Ocala, Florida, to their summer residence in Oshkosh, Wisconsin. The Wittman "O&O" N41SW (41 for 1941, year of his first marriage, plus SW, his initials) crashed five miles south of Stevenson, Alabama, killing both Wittman and Muir. The cause was improper installation of the wing fabric, causing it to debond, resulting in aileron/wing flutter.

Wittman was posthumously inducted into the Motorsports Hall of Fame of America in 1998 and the National Aviation Hall of Fame in 2014.

== Wittman-designed aircraft ==
- Wittman Hardley Ableson
- Wittman Chief Oshkosh
- Wittman D-12 Bonzo
- Wittman DFA "Little Bonzo"
- Wittman Buttercup
- Wittman Big X
- Wittman Tailwind
- Wittman V-Witt
