= Southern Aeronautical Scamp =

Scamp

General information
- Type: Homebuilt aircraft
- National origin: United States
- Manufacturer: Southern Aeronautical Corporation

The Southern Aeronautical Scamp is an American aircraft designed for homebuilt construction and Formula V Air Racing.

== Design and development ==
The Scamp is a single place, mid-wing aircraft with conventional landing gear. The fuselage is constructed with steel tubing and covered with fabric. The wings are of all wood construction.

== Specifications (Scamp) ==
Data from Air trails

General characteristics

- Crew: one
- Length: 14 ft (4.3 m)
- Wingspan: 17 ft (5.2 m)
- Height: 4 ft (1.2 m)
- Wing area: 75 sq ft (7.0 m^{2})
- Empty weight: 400 lb (181 kg)
- Gross weight: 700 lb (318 kg)
- Fuel capacity: 10 U.S. gallons (38 L; 8.3 imp gal)
- Powerplant: 1 × Volkswagen air-cooled engine , 65 hp (48 kW)
- Propellers: 2-bladed wooden

Performance

- Maximum speed: 130 kn (150 mph, 240 km/h)
- Cruise speed: 109 kn (125 mph, 201 km/h)
- Stall speed: 32 kn (37 mph, 60 km/h)
- Range: 175 nmi (201 mi, 324 km)
- Service ceiling: 10,000 ft (3,000 m)
- Rate of climb: 1,000 ft/min (5.1 m/s)

== See also ==
Aircraft of comparable role, configuration, and era

- Monnett Sonerai
