= Great Plains Aircraft Supply Company =

- Company type: Experimental Aircraft Parts and Plans
- Industry: Experimental Aviation
- Genre: Aircraft Manufacture
- Founded: 1982
- Founder: Steve and Linda Bennett
- Headquarters: Bennington, Nebraska, United States
- Products: VW Engine Conversions and aircraft plans
- Website: https://www.greatplainsas.com/

Great Plains Aircraft Supply Company is an American aircraft manufacturer of experimental plans based primarily on the Volkswagen air-cooled engine. Great Plains provides VW engine conversions for use in experimental aircraft.

Great Plains has been selling and manufacturing conversions of VW engines since circa 1982. Among their offerings is the Great Plains Type 1 Front Drive engine series.

Great Plains also helds the rights to the Sonerai series of aircraft designed by John Monnett until 2015, when they were acquired by Sonerai Works LLC, of Franksville, Wisconsin. Previous owners of the design were INAV Experimental in 1987.

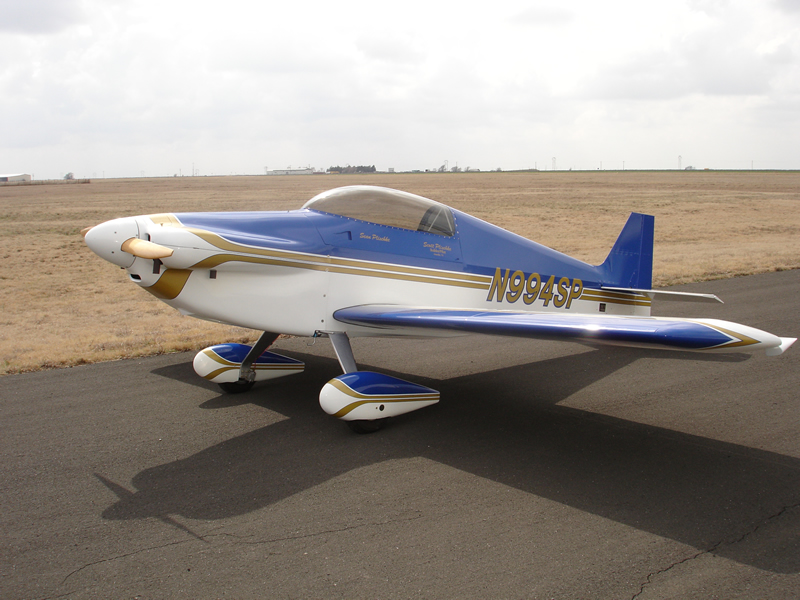
Sonerai IIL

== Aircraft ==
Summary of aircraft built by
| Model name | First flight | Number built | Type |
|---|---|---|---|
| Sonerai | 1974 | Number built 1400+ | 4130 Tube and fabric with aluminum wings |
| Easy Eagle 1 Biplane | 2010 | Number built 5+ | Tube fuselage and wood-and-fabric wings Biplane |
