= Scott Ol' Ironsides =

Early homebuilt aircraft

Ol' Ironsides

General information
- Type: Homebuilt aircraft
- National origin: United States
- Designer: Ron Scott

History
- First flight: 22 November 1969

The Scott Ol' Ironsides is an early homebuilt aircraft using wood construction with stressed fiberglass panel construction.

== Design ==
Ol' Ironsides is a strut-braced high-wing aircraft with conventional landing gear arrangement. The wooden fuselage is made of Sitka Spruce. Fiberglass composite skins were formed in 4 x 8 sheets using two layers of cloth with resin over a waxed Masonite table. The landing gear legs, fuel tank, wink tips, wheel pants, and cowling were also formed out of fibre-glass. Scott integrated elements of the Bowers Fly Baby and Champion J-1 Jupiter construction with the Wittman Tailwind airfoil and general layout into the design.

== Operational history ==
Construction of the aircraft was started in the mid-1960s starting with a model rather than a drawing. Ol' Ironsides first flew on 22 November 1969 with a Continental C-85 engine sourced from a Cessna 140. In 1985 the prototype aircraft was restored and re-engined with a Continental O-200 and Sterba wooden propeller.

== Specifications (Ol' Ironsides) ==
Data from Sport Aviation

General characteristics

- Crew: 1
- Length: 17 ft (5.2 m)
- Wingspan: 19 ft 6 in (5.94 m)
- Wing area: 79.2 sq ft (7.36 m^{2})
- Empty weight: 720 lb (327 kg)
- Gross weight: 1,125 lb (510 kg)
- Fuel capacity: 18 gal
- Powerplant: 1 × Continental C-85 4-cyl. horizontally opposed piston engine, 85 hp (63 kW)
- Powerplant: 1 × Continental O-200 4-cyl. horizontally opposed piston engine, 100 hp (75 kW)

Performance

- Cruise speed: 117 kn (135 mph, 217 km/h) , 145 mph (233 km/h) with O-200
- Stall speed: 48 kn (55 mph, 89 km/h)
- Rate of climb: 1,200 ft/min (6.1 m/s)

Avionics
Terra Radio, Flybuddy Loran

== See also ==
Aircraft of comparable role, configuration, and era

- Wittman Tailwind
- Hanson Woodwind
