= Eaves Cougar 1 =

American homebuilt aircraft

Cougar 1

General information
- Type: Homebuilt aircraft
- National origin: United States
- Designer: Leonard R. Eaves
- Status: Plans no longer available (2012)

History
- Introduction date: 1963
- Developed from: Nesmith Cougar

The Eaves Cougar 1 is an American homebuilt aircraft that was designed by Leonard R. Eaves of Oklahoma City, Oklahoma and made available in the form of plans for amateur construction.

== Design and development ==
The Eaves Cougar 1 was based upon the Nesmith Cougar and features a strut-braced high wing, a two-seats-in-side-by-side configuration enclosed cockpit, fixed conventional landing gear and a single engine in tractor configuration.

The aircraft is made from welded steel tubing and wood, covered in doped aircraft fabric. Its wing has a 23.25 ft (7.1 m) span and can be folded for storage or ground transportation. Engines used typically range from 85 to 125 hp (63 to 93 kW) but the airframe can accept engines as powerful as the 150 hp (112 kW) Lycoming O-320.

The aircraft has an empty weight of 700 lb (320 kg) and a gross weight of 1,400 lb (640 kg), giving a useful load of 700 lb (320 kg). With full fuel of 35 U.S. gallons (130 L; 29 imp gal) the payload is 490 lb (220 kg).

The construction of the prototype was commenced in January 1957 at Eaves' home in Oklahoma City. The design won third place in the 1963 Experimental Aircraft Association aircraft design competition. It was featured on the cover of Sport Aviation magazine in February 1963.

Eaves was killed in the crash of another homebuilt aircraft design on 3 March 2012 at age 92 and plans for the Cougar appear to be no longer available.

== Specifications (Cougar 1) ==
Data from Plane and Pilot

General characteristics

- Crew: one
- Capacity: one passenger
- Length: 18 ft 6 in (5.64 m)
- Wingspan: 23 ft 4 in (7.11 m)
- Empty weight: 700 lb (318 kg)
- Gross weight: 1,400 lb (635 kg)
- Fuel capacity: 35 U.S. gallons (130 L; 29 imp gal)
- Powerplant: 1 × Continental C85 four cylinder, air-cooled, four stroke aircraft engine, 85 hp (63 kW)
- Propellers: 2-bladed McCauley Propellers

Performance

- Maximum speed: 155 mph (249 km/h, 135 kn)
- Cruise speed: 135 mph (217 km/h, 117 kn)
- Stall speed: 60 mph (97 km/h, 52 kn)
- Range: 400 mi (640 km, 350 nmi)
- Rate of climb: 600 ft/min (3.0 m/s)
