= Wittman D-12 Bonzo =

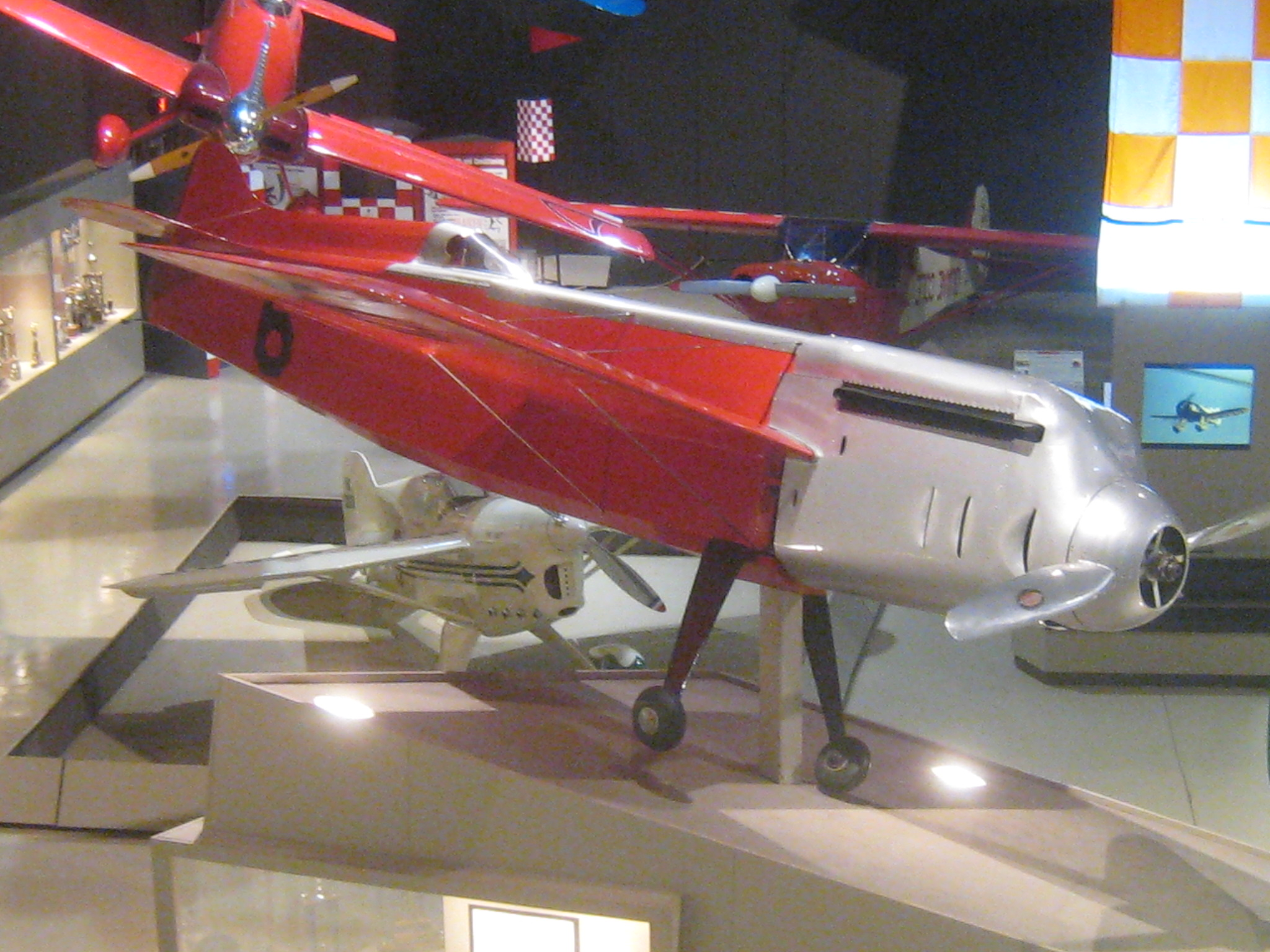

General information
- Type: Racing aircraft
- National origin: United States of America
- Designer: Steve Wittman
- Number built: 1

History
- First flight: 1935

The Wittman D-12 "Bonzo" was an air racer designed by Steve Wittman for the Thompson Trophy races. The aircraft's top speed of 325 mph (523 km/h) made it faster than any United States military aircraft of the era.

== Development ==
Wittman purchased a Curtiss D-12 engine in 1934, and designed "Bonzo" around it. In 1935, it took part in the Thompson Trophy Race. In 1936, a spring steel landing gear was installed. In 1937 a ducted fan was added to the spinner inlet, flaps were added and wingspan was reduced to 17 ft (5 m). Ram air was added for the carburetors, and modified several times to get even fuel pressure.

== Design ==
"Bonzo" featured a mid-winged taildragger design with a small squarish cross-section. The aircraft was finished in red and silver, like Wittman's smaller racer "Chief Oshkosh". The spinner featured a center cut-out to provide cooling air to a radiator. The wings were made of wood with aircraft fabric covering and closely spaced wing ribs.

== Operational history ==
"Bonzo" was not ready for the 1934 National Air Races in time.

1935 National Air Races
Bonzo places second behind "Mr.Mulligan" with a speed of 218.69 mph (351.95 km/h).
1936 National Air Races
Bonzo catches fire en route at Cheyenne, Wyoming.
1937 Thompson Trophy races
Engine trouble forces Wittman from lead to fifth at 250 mph (402 km/h).
1938 National Air Races
Third place with a leaking radiator.
1939 National Air Races
Fifth place.

The D-12 engine was sold to the Falin Propeller Co. for propeller testing throughout World War II.

== Variants ==
- Only one Wittman D-12 "Bonzo" was built, but Wittman used the name "Bonzo" again on his second midget racer patterned after the Wittman Buster.

== Aircraft on display ==
The D-12 "Bonzo" was donated by Wittman to anchor the EAA Airventure Museum in Oshkosh, Wisconsin in December 1959, it was later restored for display in 1982.

== Specifications (Wittman D-12 Bonzo) ==
Data from Sport Aviation

General characteristics

- Capacity: 1
- Length: 20 ft (6.1 m)
- Wingspan: 20 ft (6.1 m)
- Empty weight: 1,650 lb (748 kg)
- Gross weight: 2,470 lb (1,120 kg)
- Powerplant: 1 × Curtiss D-12 V-12 liquid-cooled piston engine, 485 hp (362 kW)

Performance

- Maximum speed: 282 kn (325 mph, 523 km/h)
- Cruise speed: 220 kn (250 mph, 400 km/h)
- Stall speed: 74 kn (85 mph, 137 km/h)
