= Wittman Tailwind =

Two-seat home-build light aircraft

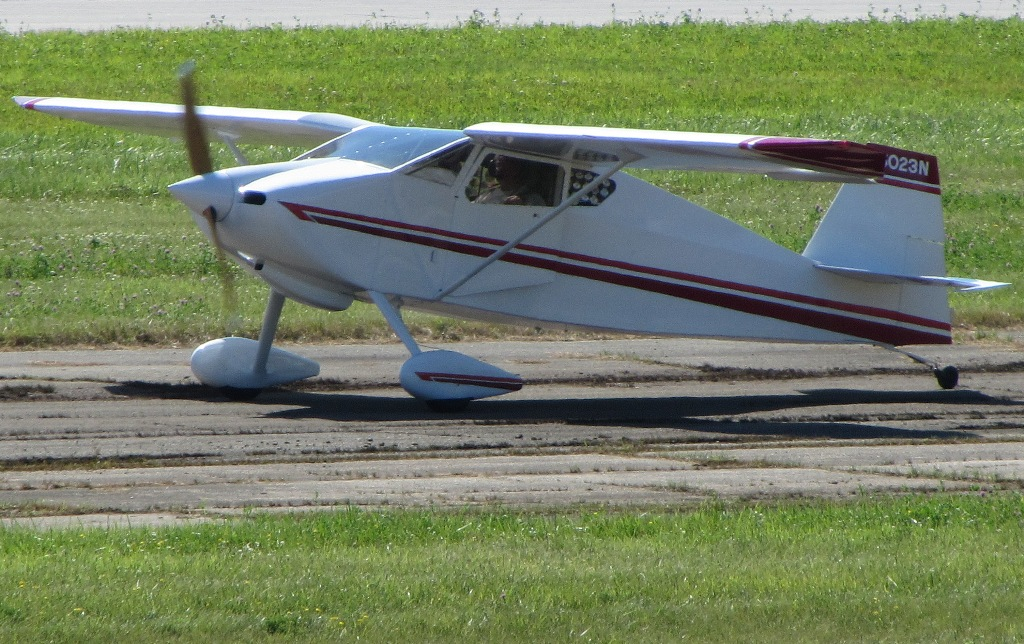
- Wittman W-10 Tailwind

General information
- Type: light aircraft
- Manufacturer: homebuilt
- Designer: Steve Wittman
- Number built: >350

The Wittman Tailwind is a popular two-seat light aircraft for homebuilding. It is a high-wing, braced cabin monoplane of taildragger configuration. It is constructed with a steel tubing fuselage, wood wings, and fabric covering. It offers exceptional cruising speeds and is economical to operate and maintain.

== Design and development ==
The Tailwind is the third in a series of high-wing aircraft designed by Sylvester J. "Steve" Wittman (1904–1995), a well-known air racing pilot and race plane designer, who also played an important role in the emergence of homebuilt aircraft with the Wittman Tailwind and other designs in the United States. The first, the Wittman Buttercup two-seater, and later the Wittman Big X four-seater, which was bought by Cessna to use its spring steel landing gear. The Tailwind also inspired the last iteration, the O and O Special. A model of the 1965 Wittman Tailwind may be found in the Sun 'n Fun Museum.

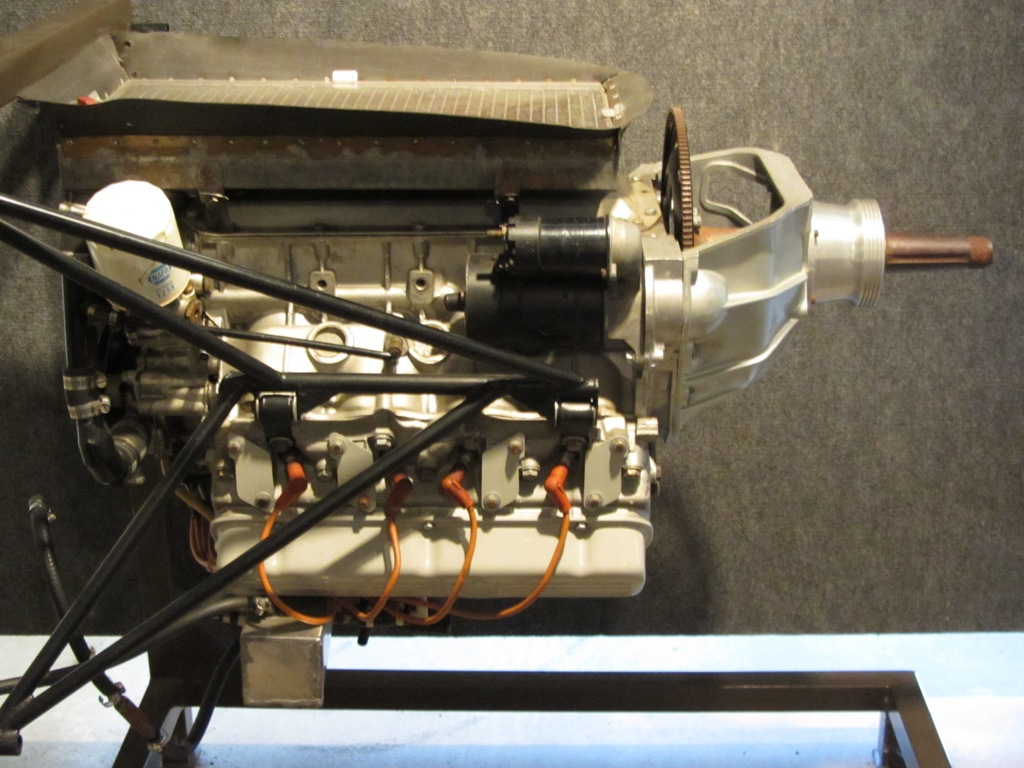
An inverted Oldsmobile engine used by Wittman in a Tailwind

Wittman developed the C-85 powered "Flying Carpet" in 1953, later renaming it to the "Tailwind". In 1953, the Tailwind became the first aircraft covered under the FAA's Experimental category to be certified to carry a passenger. While crude looking by modern standards, it outperformed many similar factory-built planes, and only with the advent of composite construction were new designs able to achieve similar speed per horsepower and range.

Steve Wittman and his wife were killed April 27, 1995 when their "O&O Special", a similar, larger and one-of-a-kind aircraft crashed. The propeller and some fabric covering from this "O&O Special" is on display in the Wittman hangar located on the Pioneer Airport, Oshkosh, Wisconsin.

Aircraft Spruce & Specialty Co of Corona, California acquired the rights to the Tailwind in January 1996 and became the exclusive distributor for plans and materials.

The design, has been advanced and standardised construction techniques have been established, a name synonymous with its advancement is Jim Clement. Jim, with the approval of Steve Wittman, created a series of modifications to standardise the design, this also created a lot more efficiency due to cleaner construction techniques. There are a variety of drawings available to tailor to the builders requirements. Jim, went on to build 12 Tailwinds in various configurations. One of the most famous (N6168X) was tested by the Comparative Aircraft Flight Efficiency Foundation, or CAFE' for short, in 1994.

See CAFE' Foundation test
https://cafe.foundation/v2/research_aprs.php
Mod drawings available-
-Rear spar carry through tube moved backwards, for better headroom.
-Door shape extended for easier ingress and egress.
-Extended first station (between firewall and front door post) by 2 inches for more leg room.
-Widening of the fuselage by 3 inches.
-Introduced using fine (1.45oz) fiberglass deck cloth and using epoxy to seal the wings.
-aluminium flaps and ailerons.
-Created a tricycle gear version set of drawings.
-With consultation with Brian Alley a set of composite cowlings were made, that has given the tailwind its current standardised look.

Brian Alley, to this day, still produces the cowlings and other composite parts needed to build a Tailwind.

== Variants ==
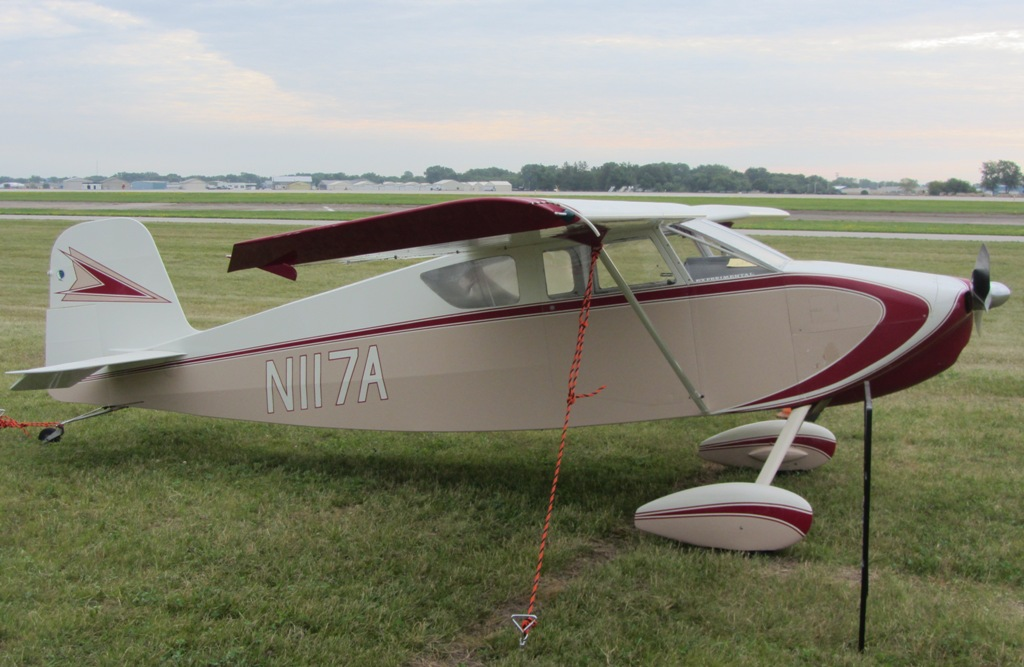
A 1965 Wittman W-8

W-8 Tailwind
The W-8 (initial version) updated to a new designation, the W-10 (see below).

W-9 Tailwind
Steve Wittman rebuilt his W8 with a constant-speed propeller, 35 gallon fuel tank, and a tricycle landing gear. he "dubbed" it a W9

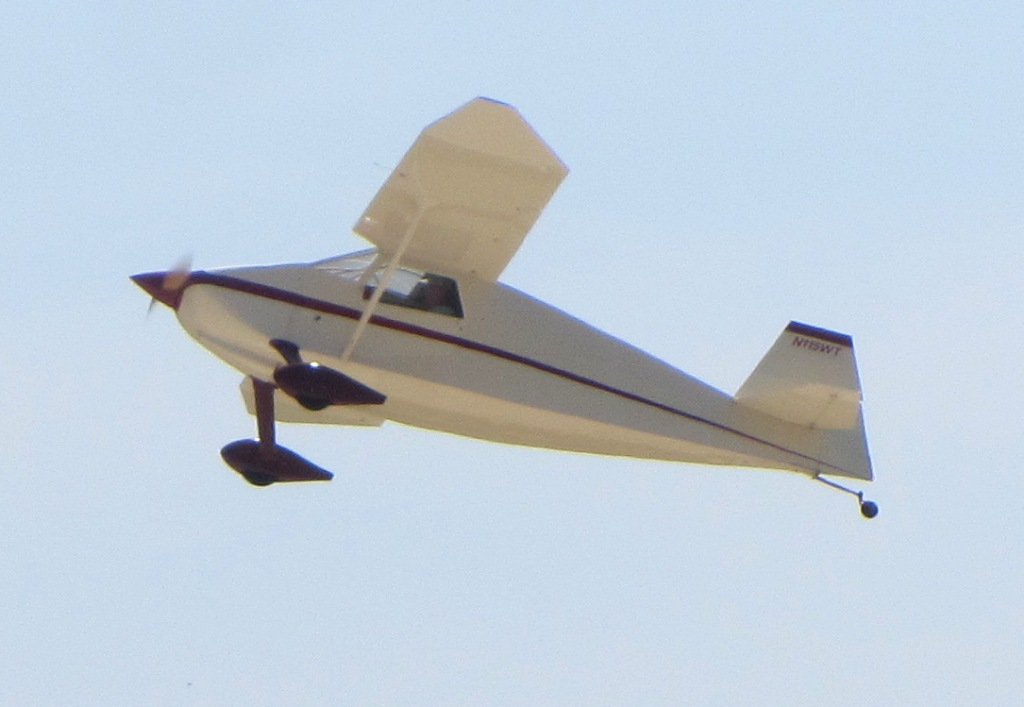
Wittman W-10 Tailwind

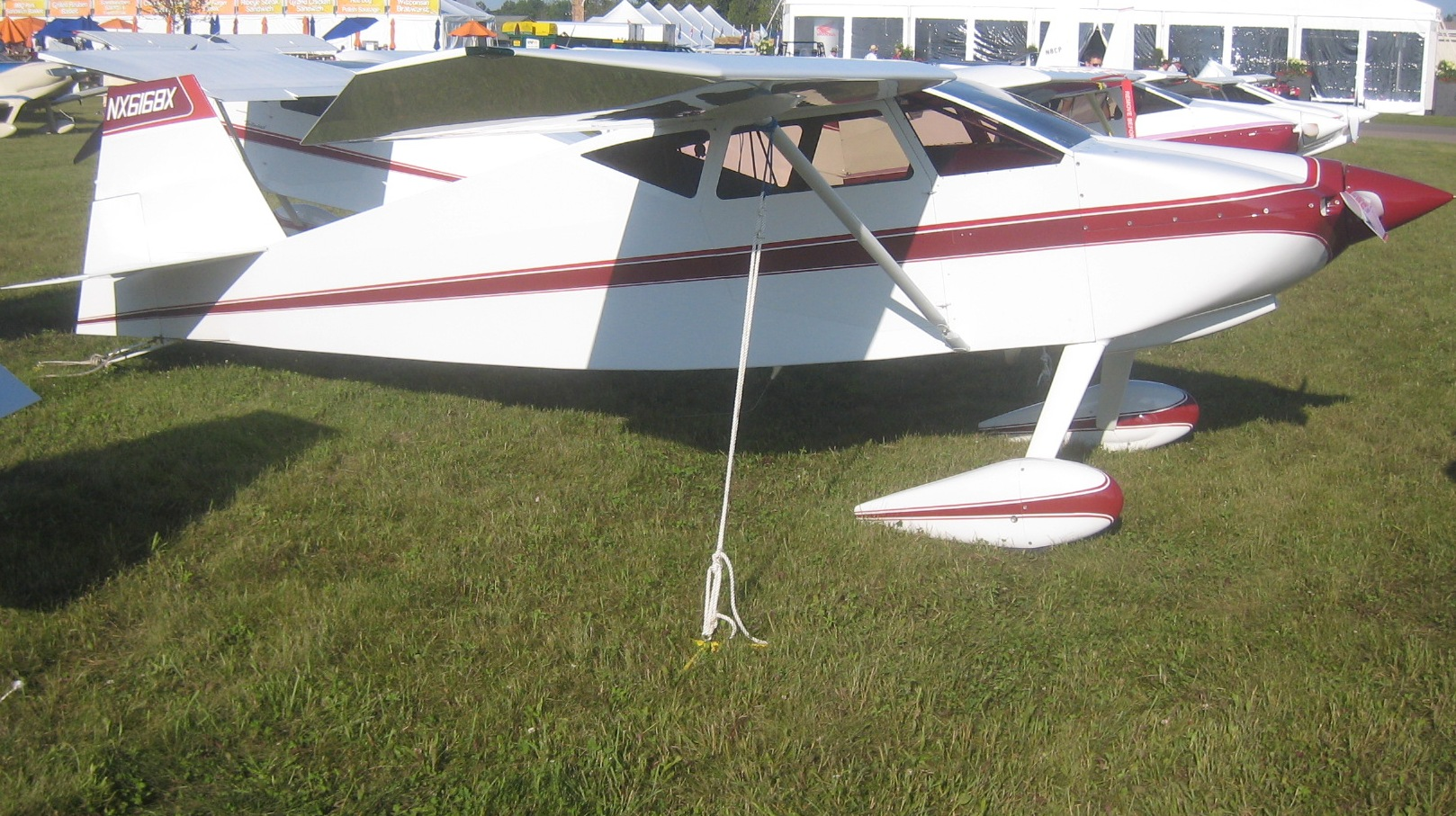
Wittman W-10 Tailwind

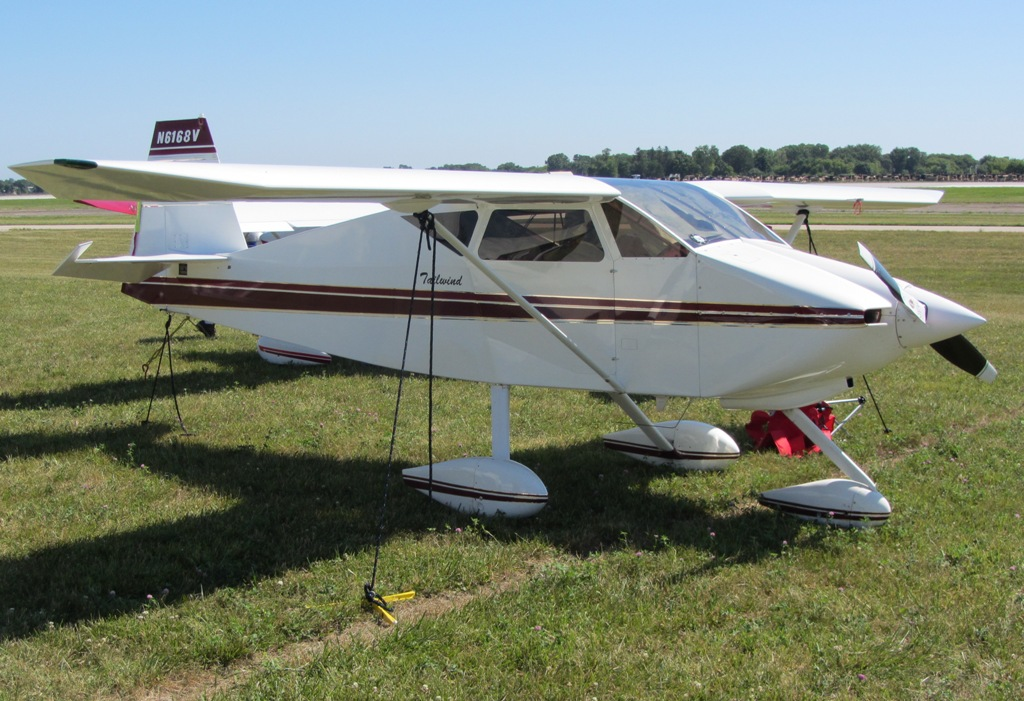
Tailwind with tricycle landing gear

W-10 Tailwind
Triangular tapered wingtips and longer fuselage. Steve Wittman used a variety of engines namely an inverted Oldsmobile alloy V8, Lycoming O-320 and Continental 0300.

AJEP Tailwind
Marketed in the UK by AJEP in the 1970s in both kit and ready-to-fly form.

== Accidents and incidents ==
- April 27, 1995 – 91-year-old aircraft designer and homebuilt aircraft proponent Steve Wittman and his wife Paula Muir were killed when their Wittman O&O Special broke up in flight due to delamination and separation of the wing fabric, resulting in wing aeroelastic flutter. The National Transportation Safety Board investigation determined that the layers and types of doping that had been used on the aircraft did not have "the best adhesive qualities" and referred to "the Poly-Fiber Covering and Painting Manual" for proper processes to use.
- May 22, 2001 – American astronaut Dr. Patricia Hilliard Robertson suffers fatal injuries when the Wittman W-8 Tailwind she is piloting cartwheels and crashes into trees while she is practicing takeoffs and landings at Manvel, Texas. She dies two days later.

== Specifications (1953 W.8) ==
General characteristics

- Crew: one pilot
- Capacity: 1 passenger
- Length: 19 ft 3 in (5.87 m)
- Wingspan: 22 ft 6 in (6.98 m)
- Height: 5 ft 5 in (1.7 m)
- Wing area: 90 sq ft (8.3 m^{2})
- Empty weight: 700 lb (317 kg)
- Gross weight: 1,300 lb (590 kg)
- Powerplant: 1 × Continental 85hp to 100hp Lycoming 100hp to 135hp , 85 to 135 hp (62 to 100 kW)

Performance

- Maximum speed: 185 mph (298 km/h, 161 kn)
- Range: 600 mi (970 km, 520 nmi)
- Service ceiling: 16,000 ft (4,900 m)
- Rate of climb: 900 ft/min (4.6 m/s)

== Specifications (W10) ==
General characteristics

- Crew: one pilot
- Capacity: 1 passenger
- Length: 19 ft 6 in (5.94 m)
- Wingspan: 24 ft 0 in (7.31 m)
- Height: 5 ft 5 in (1.7 m)
- Wing area: 90 sq ft (8.3 m^{2})
- Empty weight: 850 lb (385 kg)
- Gross weight: 1,425 lb (646 kg)
- Powerplant: 1 × Continental 85hp to 145hp Lycoming 108hp to 180hp , 85 to 180 hp (62 to 134 kW)

Performance

- Maximum speed: 210 mph (340 km/h, 180 kn)
- Range: 800 mi (1,287 km, 700 nmi)
- Service ceiling: 16,000 ft (4,900 m)
- Rate of climb: 1,200 to 2,000 ft/min (10.16 m/s)

== See also ==
Aircraft of comparable role, configuration, and era

- Wittman Buttercup
- Nesmith Cougar
- Szaraz SDS-1A Daphne
- Hanson Woodwind
- Scott Ol' Ironsides
- Bede BD-4 (two-seat versions)
