= Hanson Woodwind =

Woodwind

General information
- Type: Homebuilt aircraft
- National origin: United States
- Designer: Carl Hansen

History
- First flight: 20 June 1969
- Developed from: Wittman Tailwind

The Hanson Woodwind is an all-wooden homebuilt aircraft with a fiberglass wing.

== Design and development ==
The Woodwind was a homebuilt copy of the Wittman Tailwind using all-wood construction, rather than welded steel tube and aircraft fabric covering for the fuselage. Ironically, the Wittman design uses plywood covering for its wings, while the Woodwind uses fiberglass.

The Woodwind is a two-seat side-by-side configuration, strut-braced, high-wing aircraft with conventional landing gear and Plexiglas doors. Some construction elements were adapted from the all-wood Bowers Fly Baby. The fuselage sides and tail surfaces are built flat on a table at the same time and covered with aircraft grade plywood. The wings are covered in fiberglass with stainless steel torque tubes for aileron control. The fuel tanks and cowling are also made from fiberglass. The prototype used a moose-hide interior.

== Operational history ==
The prototype first flew on 20 June 1969. The aircraft was written off in a non-fatal accident on 5 June 1976 after hitting a large rock.

== Specifications (Hanson Woodwind) ==
Data from Sport Aviation

General characteristics

- Capacity: 2
- Empty weight: 851 lb (386 kg)
- Gross weight: 1,425 lb (646 kg)
- Fuel capacity: 32 U.S. gallons (120 L; 27 imp gal)
- Powerplant: 1 × Lycoming O-235-C , 100 hp (75 kW)
- Propellers: 2-bladed variable-pitch Sensenich "Skyblade"

Performance

- Maximum speed: 126 kn (145 mph, 233 km/h)
- Cruise speed: 120 kn (140 mph, 230 km/h)
- Stall speed: 52 kn (60 mph, 97 km/h)
- Range: 610 nmi (700 mi, 1,100 km)

== See also ==
- Wittman Tailwind
- Scott Ol' Ironsides
