= Wittman Chief Oshkosh =

Chief Oshkosh
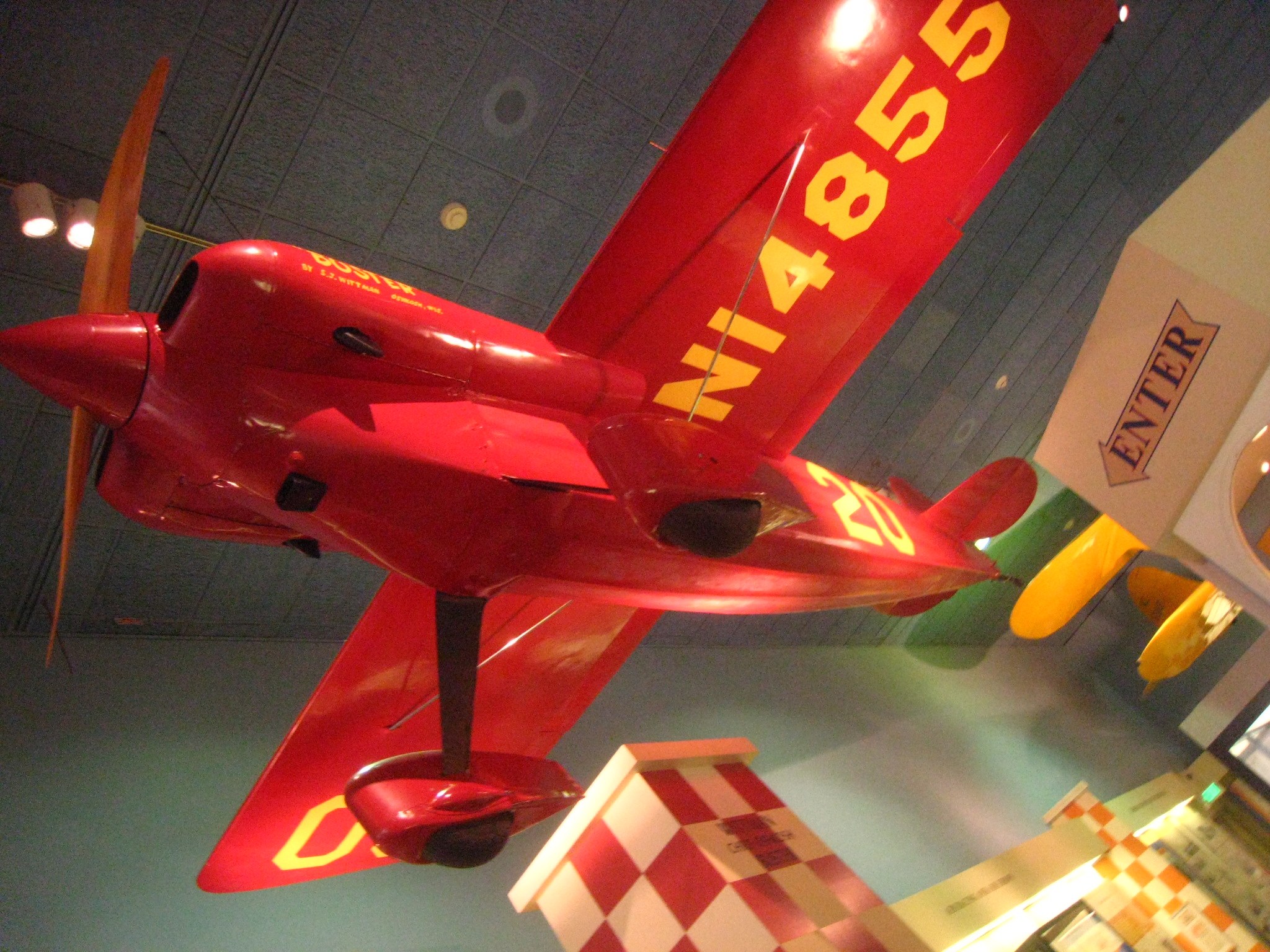
- Buster on display at the Air & Space Museum

General information
- Type: Racing aircraft
- National origin: United States of America
- Designer: Steve Wittman

History
- Introduction date: 1931
- First flight: 1931

Chief Oshkosh a.k.a. Buster is a homebuilt racing plane designed to compete in the 1931 American Cirrus Races.

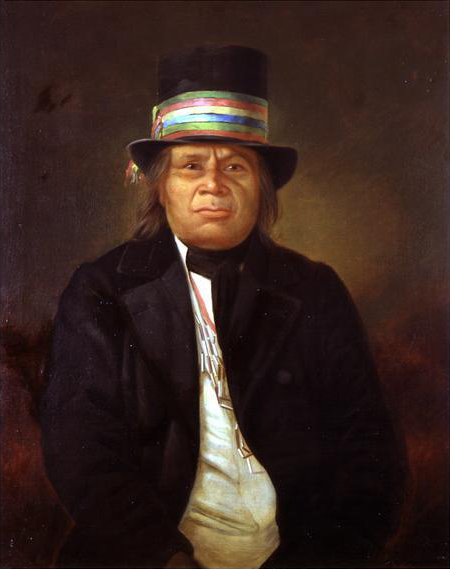
The aircraft was named after Chief Oshkosh

== Development ==
Steve Wittman started air racing in 1926 in various aircraft. In March 1931, he designed his own purpose built aircraft in Oshkosh, Wisconsin, "Chief Oshkosh". He was racing in Cleveland by August of the same year. His goal was to keep the plane light so that he could be the first to round a pylon and establish position.

== Design ==
The "Chief Oshkosh" racer was a mid-winged taildragger with undersized wheels and tires without brakes. The original was powered by an American Cirrus engine, the 1932 racer was outfitted with a 115 hp (86 kW) 349 Cubic inch Cirrus Hermes. In 1934, a smaller 16 ft (4.9 m) wing was fitted to the plane. In 1936 the plane was fitted with a Menasco CS-4 363 cubic inch engine and multiple leaf spring gear. The wing was also reduced again to 13 ft (4.0 m). In 1937, a single piece steel landing gear was used, becoming the standard on Cessna aircraft of the future.

In 1947 "Chief Oshkosh" was rebuilt with Wittman Flying Service pilot Bill Brennand to meet the new Professional Race Pilots Association midget racing standards. A Continental C-85 engine was installed and the cockpit was moved up one bay for balance. To meet rules, brakes were installed, but they were non-functional. The aircraft also had to be demonstrated in turns up to 9 gs. Brennand used Wittman's trick of tapping the accelerometer with his knuckles to get the desired reading. The first event was the Goodyear trophy races. "Chief Oshkosh" was renamed after a cartoon character "Buster".

== Operational history ==
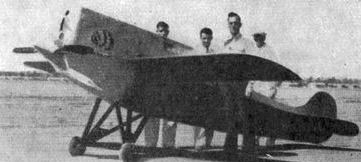
Wittman Chief Oshkosh photo from L'Aerophile September 1933

- 1931 National Air Races – aircraft developed wing flutter. Third place in 400 cubic inch class at 150.27 mph speed.
- 1931 New York Air Races – Five firsts in the 350 cubic inch class, one second in free for all.
- 1932 National Air Races – one first, one second, one fourth, one sixth and a seventh place.
- 1932 All American Air Races Miami – won the Glenn Curtiss Trophy with a 166 mph speed.
- 1933 International Air Races – Two second place, and two third-place victories.
- 1933 All American Air Races Miami – third place
- 1933 Chicago – two thirds, one fourth, and two fifth place wins. Wittman also raced in his Pobjoy Special at the same races.
- 1934 National Air Races – two thirds, two fourths and two fifths with a smaller wing and a top speed of 186 mph.
- 1935 National Air Races – two thirds and two fifths.
- 1935 All American Air Races Miami – two thirds and one second with a top speed of 202 mph
- 1936 National Air Races – dropped out after a shaft failure, causing a forced landing into a Northrop A-17.
- 1937 National Air Races – three firsts and one second.
- 1937 World record for class over 100 km course – 238.22 mph.
- 1938 Oakland Air Races – "Chief Oshkosh" blew an engine and flipped on landing in a marsh. The aircraft wreck was brought back and stored in Wittman's Oshkosh hangar.
- 1947 Goodyear Air Races – The newly rebuilt "Buster" was flown by Bill Brennand winning with a speed of 169.5 mph. The race was flown with a substitute propeller after the custom prop shredded in qualifications.
- 1948 Goodyear Air Races – fourth place at 167 mph
- 1949 Goodyear Air Races – Won the Goodyear trophy at 177 mph.
- 1949 Continental Motors Race – Second Place (Miami), fourth (San Diego), third (Newhall, California), and fourth (Ontario, California).
- 1950 Continental Motors Race – Fifth Place (Miami), first (White Plains, New York), first (Chattanooga), and second (Reading, Pennsylvania).
- 1951 Continental Motors Race – Now flown by Bob Porter – third and a fourth (Chattanooga), second in the Rebat Race.
- 1952 Continental Motors Race – Fourth place (Detroit).
- 1954 Continental Motors Race – Third place (Dansville, New York)

After the July 4 race, Buster was given to the Smithsonian.

== Variants ==
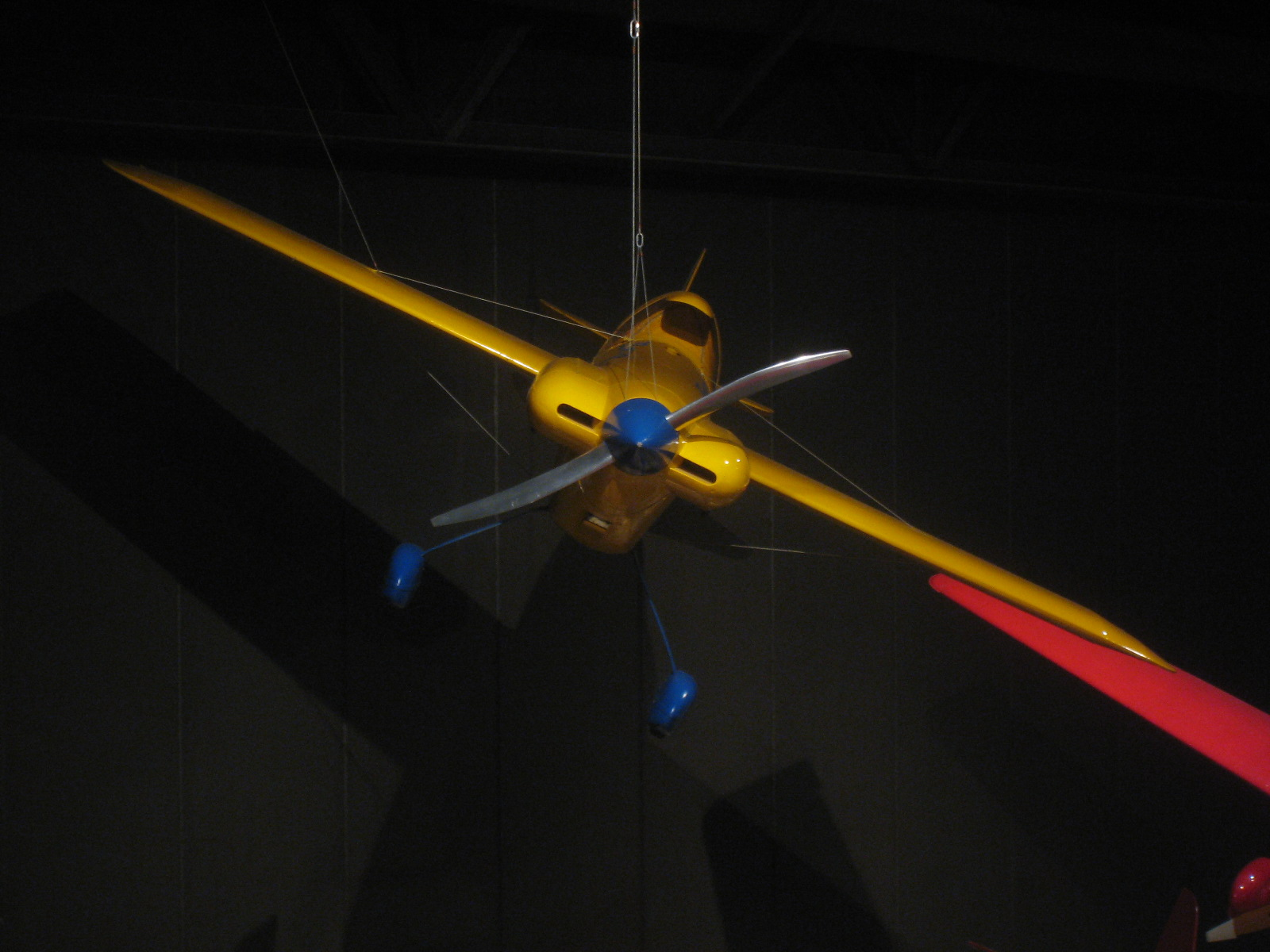
"Little Bonzo" Wittman DFA

- Wittman Bonzo was a second midget racer built new in 1948 patterned after "Buster"
- Cassutt Special was a Formula One racer patterned after "Buster".

== Aircraft on display ==
"Buster" a.k.a. "Chief Oshkosh" resides in the National Air and Space Museum in Washington, D.C.

- A replica of Chief Oshkosh was built using remaining wing parts of the original aircraft and displayed at the Florida Air Museum.

== Specifications (Wittman "Chief Oshkosh") ==
Data from Sport Aviation

General characteristics

- Capacity: 1
- Wingspan: 19 ft (5.8 m)
- Fuel capacity: 15 U.S. gallons (57 L; 12 imp gal)
- Powerplant: 1 × American Cirrus , 115 hp (86 kW)

Performance
