= Formula V Air Racing =

American air racing class

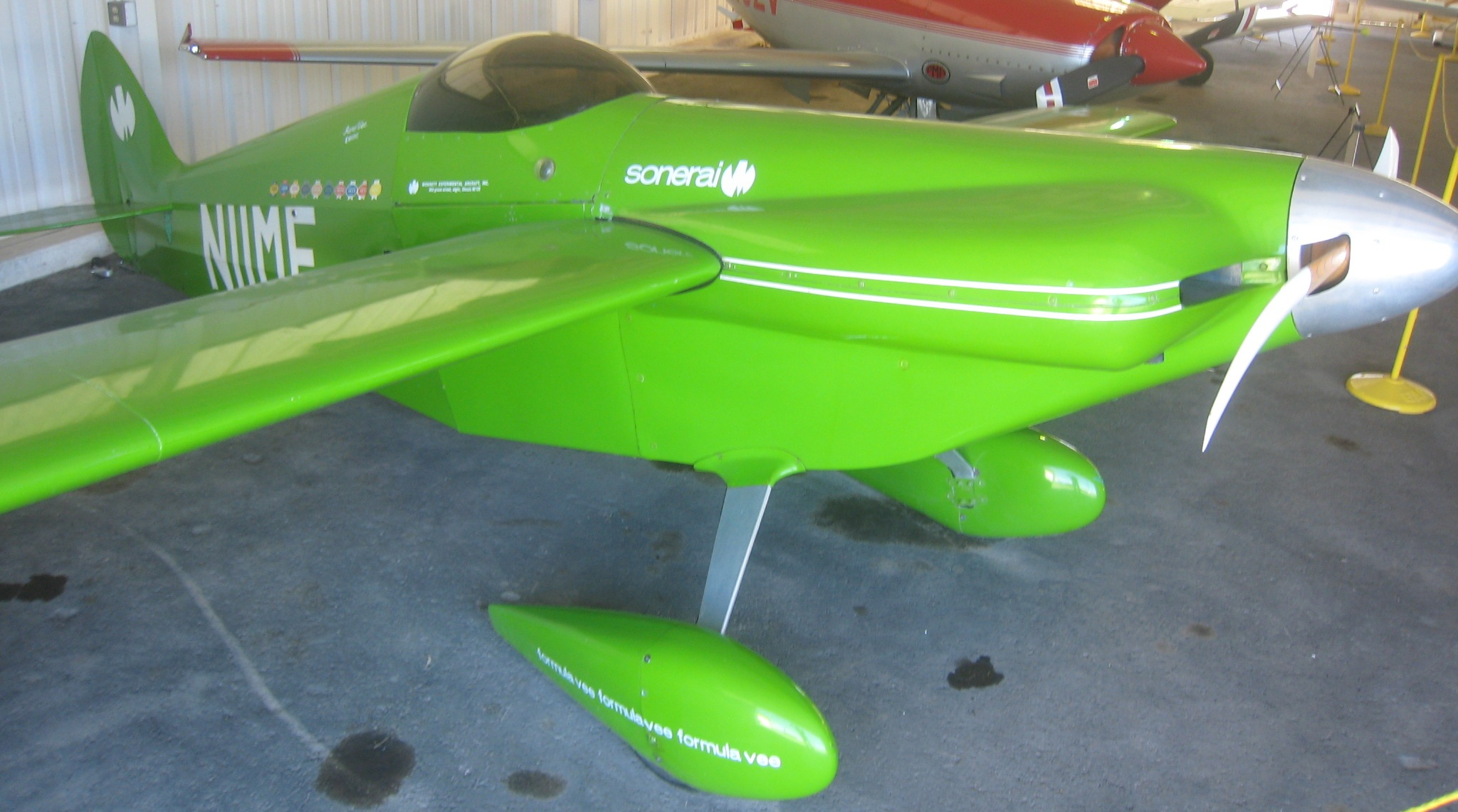
A Formula V Racer, the Monnett Sonerai I.

Formula V Air Racing is an American motorsport that involves small aircraft using engines up to 100 cubic inches (1.6 litres) in displacement.

== History ==
The proposal for Formula V has its roots in the 1964 Reno Air Races. In 1969, Air racer, Steve Wittman presented at the Rockford air convention of the Experimental Aircraft Association specifications for a racing event based around aircraft powered with a Volkswagen air-cooled engine.

Racers compete around a 2-mile oval course that subject the racers to up to 2.2g.

Several aircraft were capable of meeting the specifications for Formula V at its creation. Specific designs were introduced shortly after that maximized speed for the configuration.

Aircraft include:

- Monnett Sonerai
- Wittman V-Witt
- Southern Aeronautical Renegade
- Southern Aeronautical Scamp

== Champions ==
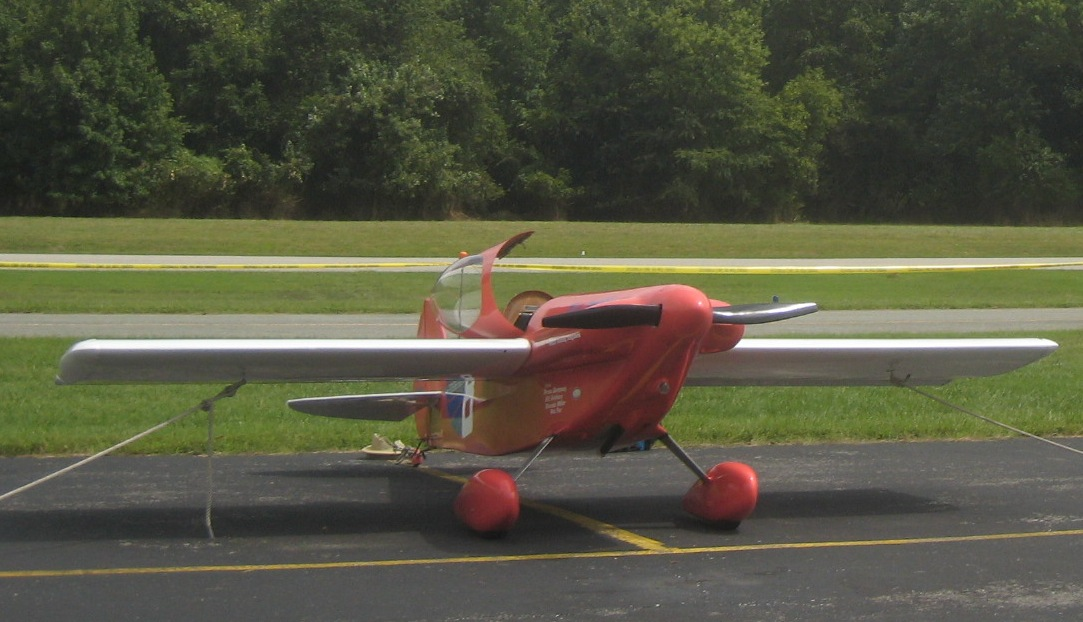
Brian Dempsey's Sonerai I "Miss Annapolis"

Winners of the Formula V National Championship are determined by points from the years events. Since 1995 the winner also holds The Wittman Trophy for a year.

- Steve Wittman 1977-81
- Charles Terry 1985
- Rick Leonard 1987-88
- Brian Dempsey 1989-95 Sonerai "Miss Annapolis"
- Dave Patterson 1996-97
