= Sterba =

Štěrba (Czech feminine: Štěrbová) or Sterba may refer to:

- Helena Štěrbová (born 1988), Czech handball player
- Jan Štěrba (born 1981), Czech sprint canoeist
- Lenka Štěrbová (born 1994), Czech swimmer
- Marta Štěrbová, Czech orienteering competitor
- Tatana Sterba (born 1976), dance and trance producer better known under her alias DJ Tatana

== See also ==
- Sterba's corydoras
