= Monnett Sonerai =

American homebuilt aircraft

Sonerai
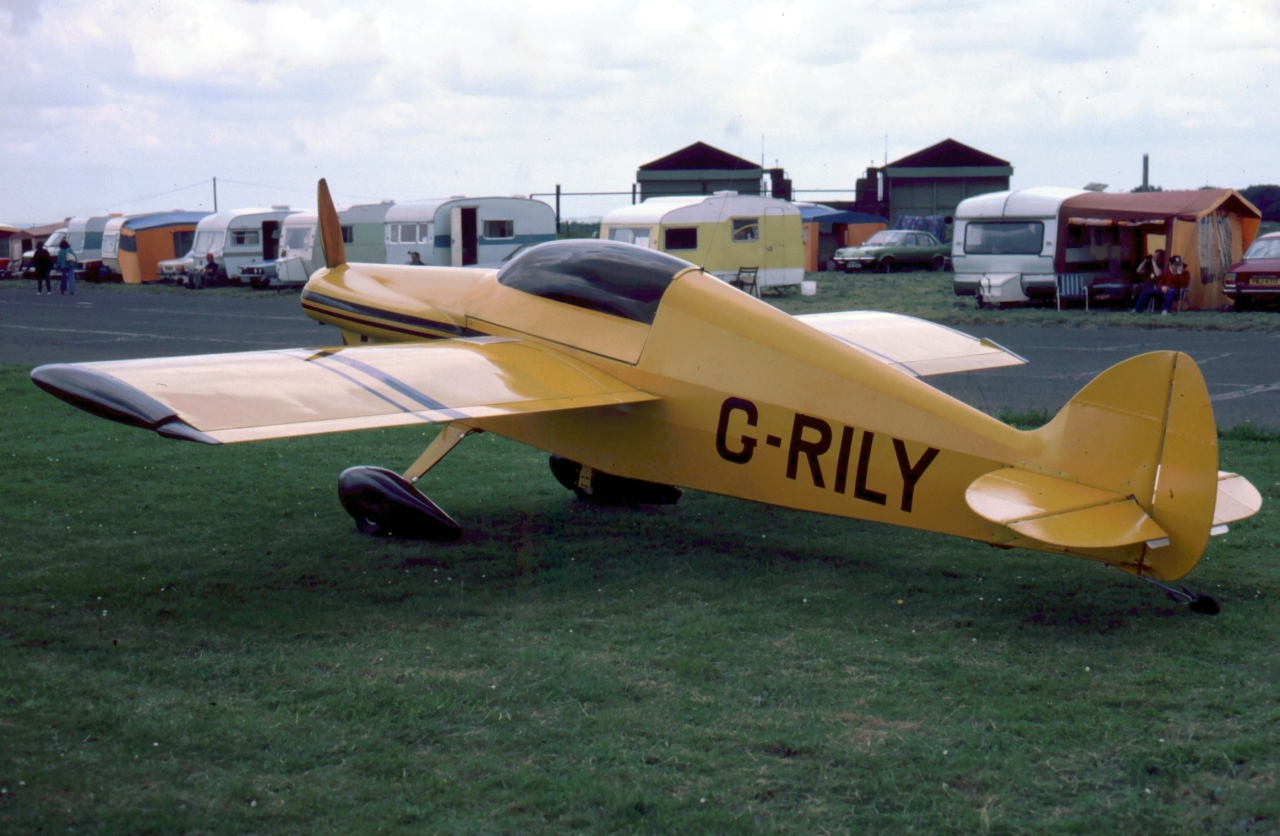
- Sonerai II

General information
- Type: Homebuilt aircraft
- Manufacturer: Monett Aircraft
- Designer: John Monnett

History
- Introduction date: 1971
- First flight: July 20, 1971

The Sonerai is a small, VW-powered homebuilt aircraft, designed by John Monnett. The Sonerai began to compete as a single-seat, mid-wing, tailwheel Formula-V racer class formed in 1972. The Sonerai soon evolved into a two-seat model called the Sonerai II.

Later versions included a low-wing Sonerai IIL, a tricycle-gear Sonerai IILT and finally the stretched Sonerai IILS and IILTS.

John Monnett came up with the name Sonerai from a combination of the words Sonic and Cosmic-Ray. Many Sonerais have been built and it remains a very popular design for people seeking a low-cost experimental aircraft with good speed and maneuverability. The airframe cost to build in 1974 was estimated at $2,500. The 2010 airframe cost is approximately $6,000 (US) and the total cost is approximately $15,000 (US) with the addition of hardware, instrumentation, engine and other required items. The time to build is between 800 and 1000 hours.

== Design and development ==
The Sonerai I design and construction started in 1970 with the goal of a flying aircraft to be demonstrated at the 1971 EAA airshow. The aircraft was to meet the new Formula V rules and those of the Professional Race Pilots Association (PRPA) for aircraft powered by 1600cc Volkswagen engines (it will accept VW engines from 1600 to 2800cc displacement).

Inspired by the Spitfire, an elliptical tail profile was incorporated. Elliptical wingtips and a low-wing configuration were dropped, but a low-wing Sonerai II variant was released later. The Sonerai I was designed to use a direct drive 1,600cc VW engine and the Sonerai II was designed to use the 1700cc VW engine.

The wings were designed to fold alongside the fuselage for towing without a trailer and compact storage. The Sonerai II was designed to be soloed from the rear seat. The aircraft is built around a fabric-covered steel-tube fuselage and tail, with all-aluminum wings and a fiberglass cowl. The plans cost $50 and $57 in 1974.

Great Plains Aircraft Supply Company held the rights to the Sonerai series of aircraft until 2015. Sonerai Works LLC, of Franksville, Wisconsin, purchased the rights to Sonerai plans and parts from Great Plains in 2015. Sonerai Works LLC was formed by Fred Keip. a Sonerai IIL builder, owner, and pilot, who was Sonerai Newsletter editor and publisher 1996 –2010, and had been a technical support provider for Sonerai builders over 28 years (an EAA Technical Counselor since 1987).

In December 2019 the design was acquired by Sonex Aircraft.

The aircraft is not available as a kit, and is built using plans, although some parts are available.

== Operational history ==
The prototype Sonerai 1 was displayed at the Experimental Aircraft Association Airshow in Oshkosh, Wisconsin where Monnett eventually relocated. The aircraft was painted a bright green that became the color of all the future prototypes and company marketing. The shade was from a 1971 Dodge Charger John Monnett saw painted Sassy Grass Green.

=== World records ===
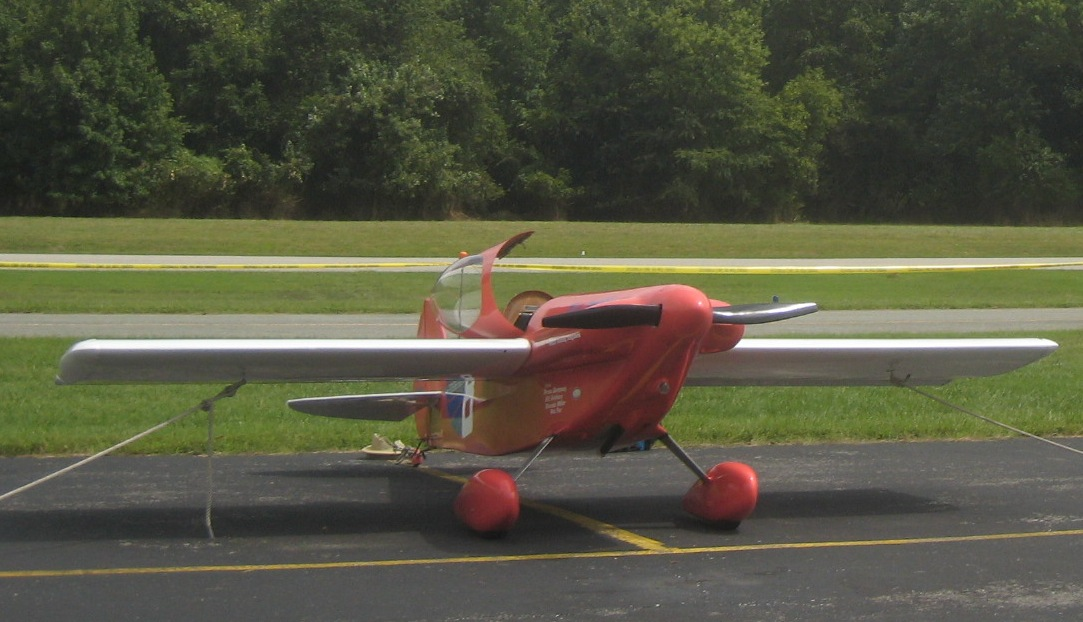
Dempsey Sonerai I

Brian Dempsey built a Sonerai I that set a world record. The C-1a/0 (Landplanes: takeoff weight less than 300 kg) Speed over a straight 15/25 km course of 292.15 km/h (181.53 mph / 157.74 kn) on February 19, 1989. Dempsey's record stood for 20 years.

Robin Austin of Australia built a Sonerai IIL with a 100 hp Rotax engine. The aircraft has set the following FAI records for C-1a/0 (Landplanes: takeoff weight less than 300 kg).

- May 17, 2008: Speed over a recognized course 404.3 km/h (251.2 mph / 218.3 kn) St. George, QLD (Australia) - Brisbane, QLD (Australia)
- June 5, 2008: Aeroplane Efficiency : 29.79 km/kg Jacobs Well, QLD (Australia)
- June 8, 2008: Aeroplane Efficiency 37.22 km/kg C1-b Class
- July 28, 2008: Speed over a recognized course 440.0 km/h (273.4 mph / 237.6 kn) Blackall, QLD (Australia) - Rockhampton, QLD (Australia)

== Variants ==
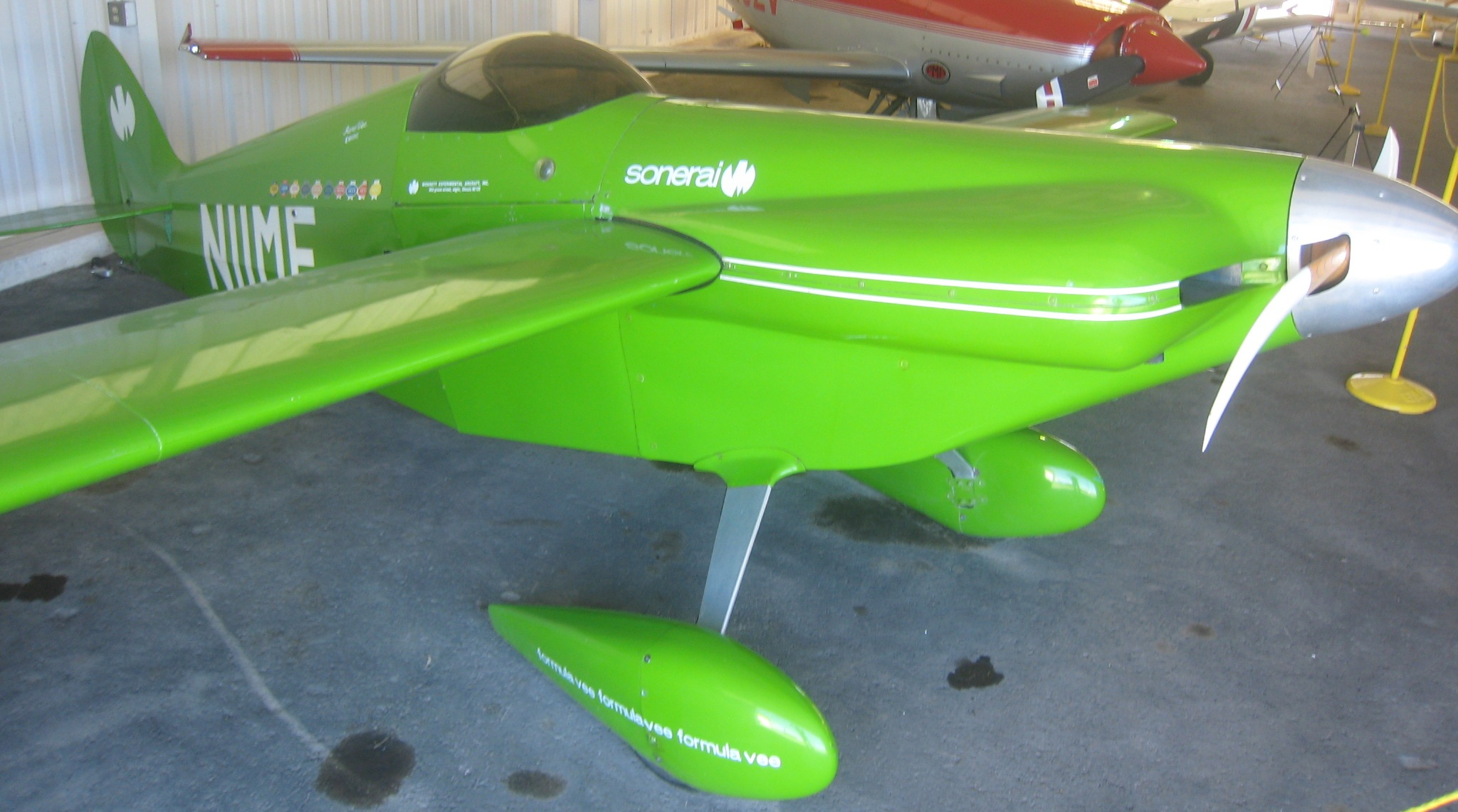
Sonerai I single seat racer

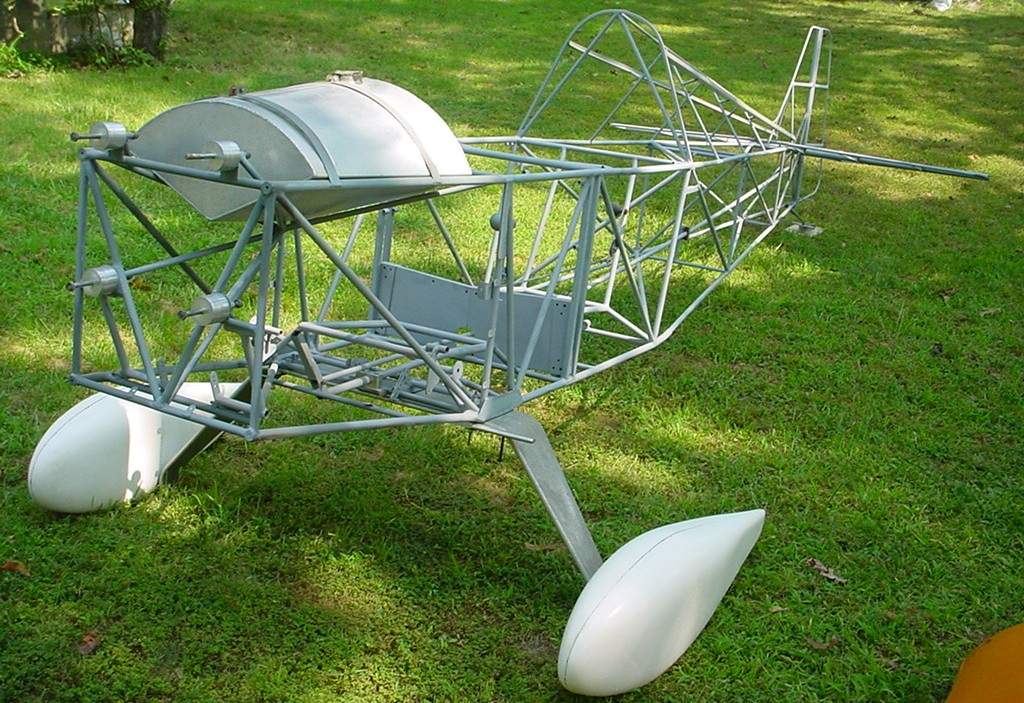
Sonerai II fuselage

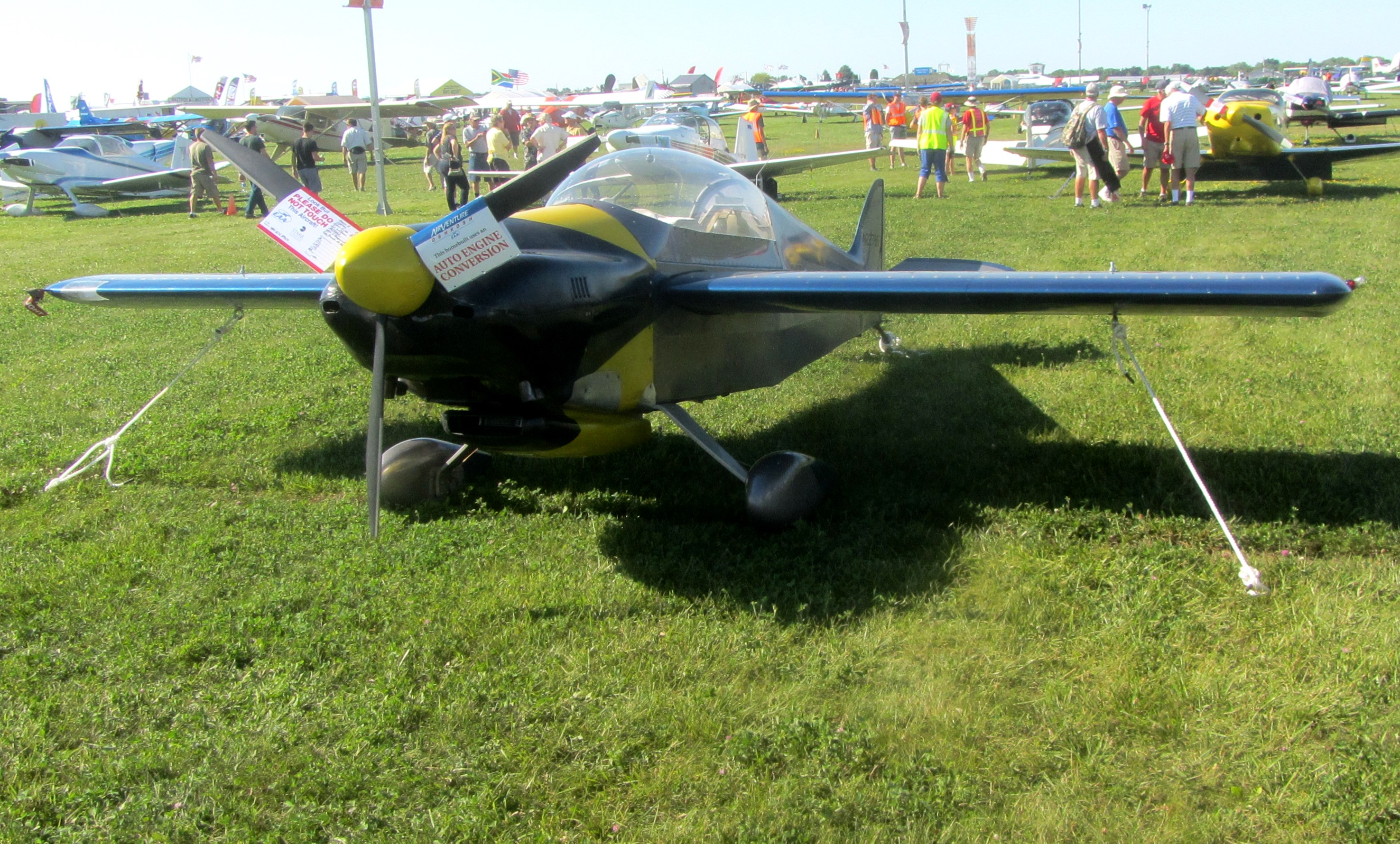
Sonerai II with a Subaru engine

Sonerai I
Single-seat Formula V Racer
Sonerai II
Two-seat, mid-wing, conventional gear
Sonerai II-L
Two-seat, low-wing, conventional gear
Sonerai II-LT
Two-seat, low-wing, conventional gear, tricycle gear developed in 1983
Sonerai II-LS
Two-seat, low-wing, stretched fuselage, conventional gear
Sonerai II-LTS
Two-seat, low-wing, stretched, tricycle gear

== Specifications (Sonerai II) ==
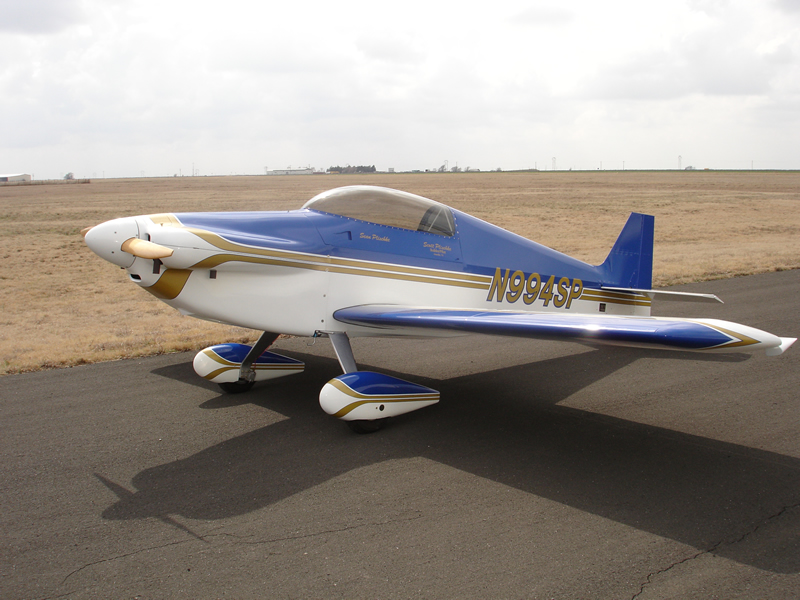
Sonerai II-L

Data from Jane's All the World's Aircraft 1982–83

General characteristics

- Crew: 1
- Capacity: 1 passenger
- Length: 18 ft 10 in (5.74 m)
- Wingspan: 18 ft 8 in (5.69 m)
- Height: 5 ft 0 in (1.52 m)
- Wing area: 84.0 sq ft (7.80 m^{2})
- Airfoil: NACA 64212
- Empty weight: 500 lb (227 kg)
- Max takeoff weight: 1,150 lb (522 kg)
- Fuel capacity: 10 US gal (8.3 imp gal; 38 L)
- Powerplant: 1 × 1700cc modified Volkswagen air-cooled engine air-cooled flat-four, 65–70 hp (48–52 kW)
- Propellers: 2-bladed

Performance

- Maximum speed: 140 kn (160 mph, 260 km/h)
- Cruise speed: 120 kn (140 mph, 230 km/h)
- Stall speed: 38 kn (44 mph, 71 km/h)
- Range: 300 nmi (350 mi, 560 km) at 75% power (with reserves)
- Rate of climb: 500 ft/min (2.5 m/s)

== See also ==
- Monnett Moni
- Monnett Monerai
- Sonex Aircraft
- Southern Aeronautical Scamp
