= Wittman Buttercup =

Buttercup
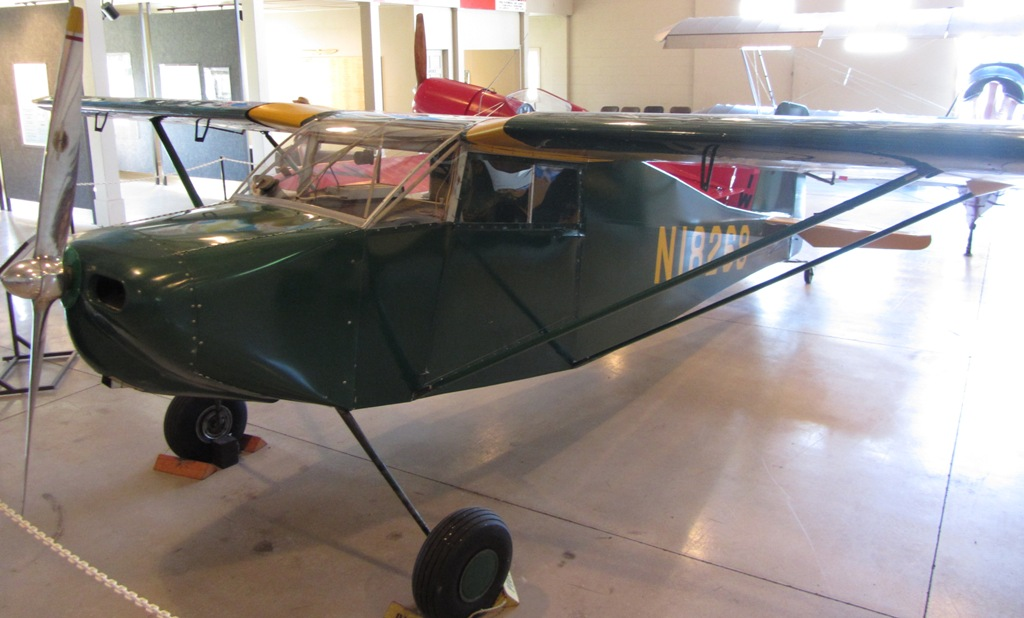
- Wittman Buttercup on display

General information
- Type: Homebuilt aircraft
- Designer: Steve Wittman

History
- Introduction date: Original - 1938, Replica - 2002
- First flight: Original - 1938, Replica - April 14, 2002
- Variant: Wittman Tailwind

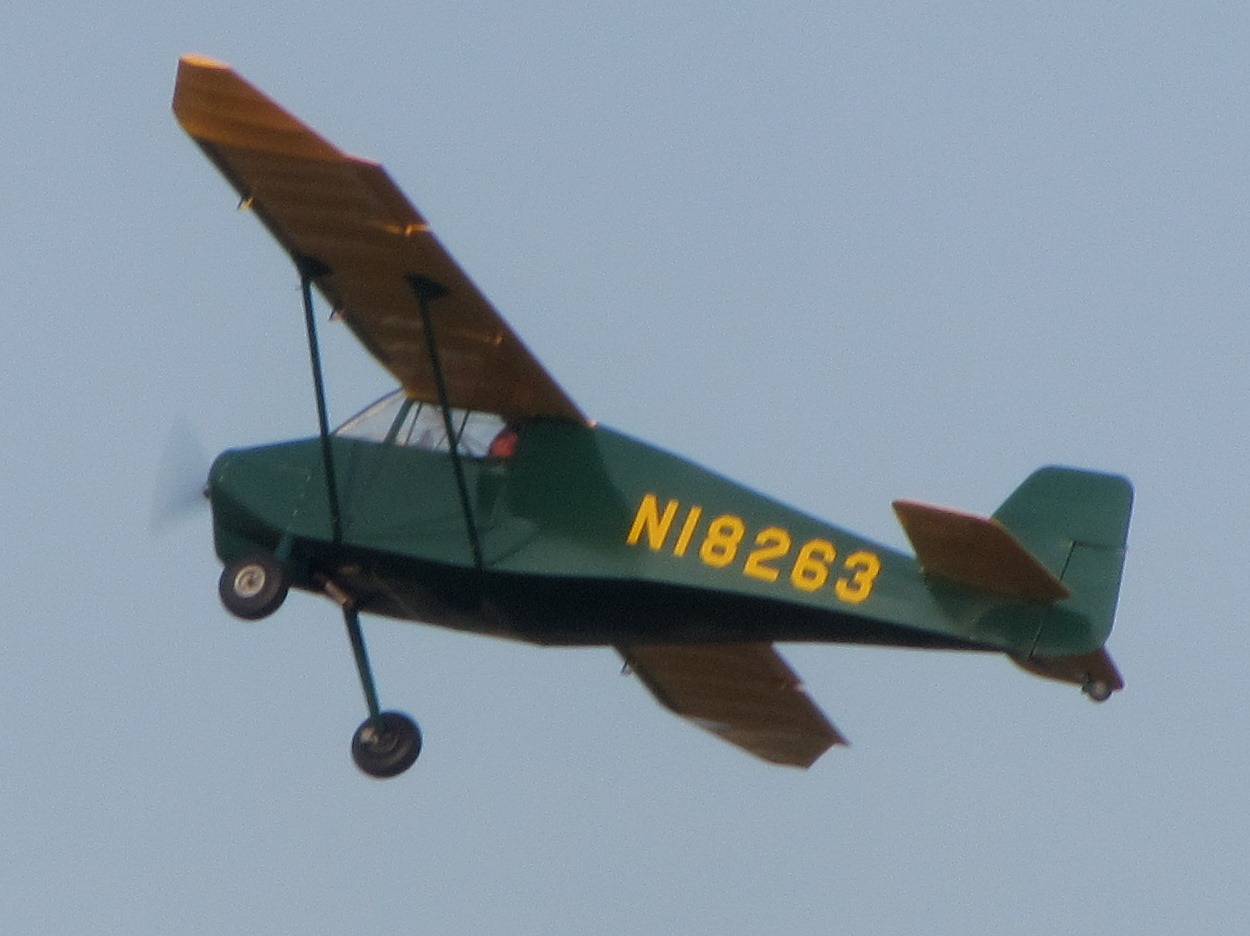
Wittman Buttercup

The Wittman W-5 Buttercup is a two place aircraft designed and built by Steve Wittman in 1938. Designated as the Buttercup Model W, the original aircraft is housed in the Experimental Aircraft Association, EAA AirVenture Museum in Oshkosh, WI.

The Buttercup was considered as the basis for a four place certified production model by Fairchild Aircraft. Fairchild executives were impressed with the aircraft that chance landed at their factory airport in Hagerstown, Maryland. Wittman sold production rights, but Fairchild did not pursue the effort due to wartime production obligations.

Experimental Aircraft Association member Earl Luce Jr. developed a replica Buttercup design, which first flew on April 14, 2002. He made a set of plans for his design, available for home builders. On 28 May 2023, 70-year-old Earl Luce Jr., said to be an excellent pilot, and his passenger were killed when the buttercup crashed as he was flying over Orleans County, New York, US.

== Specifications (1938 Wittman Buttercup - Model W - N18268) ==
Data from

General characteristics

- Crew: 1
- Capacity: 2
- Length: 20 ft 3 in (6.17 m)
- Wingspan: 30 ft 0 in (9.14 m)
- Height: 5 ft 9 in (1.75 m)
- Empty weight: 690 lb (313 kg)
- Max takeoff weight: 1,390 lb (630 kg)
- Powerplant: 1 × piston engine , 85 hp (63 kW)

Performance

- Maximum speed: 145 mph (233 km/h, 126 kn) (V_{ne})
- Cruise speed: 123 mph (198 km/h, 107 kn)
