= List of racing aircraft =

This list of racing aircraft covers aircraft which have been designed or significantly modified to take part in air races. It does not include minimally modified aircraft which were not built for racing, even if they have taken part in races.

== Racing aircraft ==
| Type | Country | Class | Date | Status | No. | Notes |
|---|---|---|---|---|---|---|
| Aero A.200 | Czechoslovakia | | 1934 | Operational | | 2 built for the Challenge International de Tourisme 1934 |
| Albatros L 69 | Germany | | 1925 | Operational | | 4 built, 2 as the L 69a. |
| Avro 539 | UK | | 1919 | Operational | | Schneider Trophy |
| Bäumer Sausewind | Germany | | 1925 | Operational | | Deutsche Rundflug 1925 |
| Bell P-39 Airacobra | US | | 1938 | | | Bendix Trophy |
| Bell P-63 Kingcobra | US | | 1942 | | | Bendix Trophy |
| Bellanca 28-70 | US | | 1934 | Operational | | Never raced. |
| Bellanca 28-92 | US | | 1937 | Operational | | 1939 Bendix Trophy |
| Bernard H.V.40 | France | | 1931 | Operational | | Never raced. |
| Bernard H.V.41 | France | | 1929 | | | Schneider Trophy |
| Bernard H.V.42 | France | | 1931 | | | Schneider Trophy |
| Bernard SIMB V.1 | France | | 1924 | | | Beaumont Cup |
| Bernard H.V.120 | France | | 1930 | | | Schneider Trophy |
| Bernard H.V.220 | France | | | Project | | |
| BFW M.23 | Germany | | 1928 | | | Ostpreussenflug |
| BFW M.29 | Germany | | 1932 | | | Challenge International de Tourisme 1932 |
| Blackburn Pellet | UK | | 1923 | | | Schneider Trophy |
| Blériot XI | France | | 1909 | | | Gordon Bennett Trophy |
| Blériot XXIII | France | | 1911 | | | Gordon Bennett Trophy |
| Blériot XXVII | France | | 1911 | | | |
| Blériot-SPAD S.26 | France | | 1919 | | | Schneider Trophy |
| Blériot-SPAD S.58 | France | | 1922 | | | Coupe Deutsch de la Meurthe |
| Blériot-SPAD S.61 | France | | 1923 | | | Coupe Michelin |
| Blériot-SPAD S.81bis | France | | 1923 | | | Coupe Michelin |
| Breese-Wilde Model 5 | US | | 1926 | | | Dole Air Race |
| Bristol Badminton | UK | | 1926 | | | King's Cup Race |
| Bristol Racer | UK | | 1922 | | | Coupe Deutsch de la Meurthe |
| Brown B-1 Racer | US | | 1933 | | | National Air Races |
| Brown B-2 Racer | US | | 1934 | | | National Air Races |
| Brown B-3 | US | | 1936 | | | Appeared in Flight for Freedom |
| Bugatti Model 100 | France | | 1939 | Project | | Eventually finished but never flown. |
| CAMS 36 | France | | 1922 | | | Built for Schneider Trophy but did not compete. |
| CAMS 38 | France | | 1923 | | | Schneider Trophy |
| Caproni Bergamaschi PL.3 | Italy | | 1934 | | | MacRobertson Trophy |
| Cassutt Special | US | | 1954 | | | Formula One Air Racing |
| Caudron C.190 | France | | 1929 | | | Challenge International de Tourisme 1929 |
| Caudron C.460 | France | | 1934 | | | Coupe Deutsch de la Meurthe |
| Cessna CR-2/GC-2 | US | | 1930 | | | Omaha Air Races |
| Cessna CR-3 | US | | 1932 | | | National Air Races |
| Cessna GC-1 | US | | 1930 | | | Cirrus Air Derby |
| Chester Jeep | US | | 1932 | | | National Air Races |
| Chester Goon | US | | 1938 | | | National Air Races |
| Christensen Zipper | US | | 1948 | | | Built for the Goodyear midget air races |
| Church Midwing JC-1 | US | | 1928 | | | National Air Races |
| Command-Aire Little Rocket | US | | 1930 | | | Cirrus Air Derby |
| Condor Shoestring | US | | 1949 | | | Formula One Air Racing |
| Curtiss CR-1 & 2 | US | | 1923 | | | Pulitzer Trophy |
| Curtiss CR-3 | US | | 1923 | | | Schneider Trophy |
| Curtiss CR-4 | US | | 1923 | | | Flight airspeed record |
| Curtiss F6C-6 | US | | 1930 | | | Variant modified for racing. Won the Curtiss Marine Trophy. |
| Curtiss No. 2 | US | | 1909 | | | Gordon Bennett Trophy |
| Curtiss R3C | US | | 1925 | | | Schneider Trophy |
| Curtiss XF6C-6 | US | | 1930 | | | F6C-6 converted to monoplane for Thompson Trophy. |
| Crosby CR-3 | US | | 1936 | | | Thompson Trophy |
| Crosby CR-4 | US | | 1938 | | | Greve Trophy |
| Darmstadt D-18 | Germany | | 1929 | | | Challenge International de Tourisme 1929 |
| Darmstadt D-22 | Germany | | 1931 | | | Challenge International de Tourisme 1932 |
| Dayton-Wright RB-1 Racer | US | | 1920 | Withdrawn | 1 | 1920 Gordon Bennett Trophy |
| de Havilland DH.71 Tiger Moth | UK | | 1927 | | | King's Cup Race |
| de Havilland DH.88 | UK | | 1934 | | | MacRobertson Air Race |
| de Havilland T.K.2 | UK | | 1935 | | | Heston-Cardiff race |
| de Havilland T.K.4 | UK | | 1937 | | | King's Cup Race |
| Denight | US | | 1949 | | | Goodyear Trophy |
| Deperdussin 1912 Racing Monoplane | France | | 1912 | | | Gordon Bennett Trophy |
| Deperdussin Coupe Schneider | France | | 1913 | | | Schneider Trophy |
| Deperdussin Monocoque | France | | 1912 | | | Gordon Bennett Trophy |
| Farman F.370 | France | | 1933 | | | Coupe Deutsch de la Meurthe |
| Farman F.380 | France | | 1933 | | | Coupe Deutsch de la Meurthe |
| Fiat BR.20 Cicogna | Italy | | 1936 | | | Istres-Damascus-Paris Air Race |
| Fiat C.29 | Italy | | 1929 | | | Schneider Trophy |
| Flagg F-15 San Diego Flaggship | US | | 1937 | | | National Air Races |
| Folkerts SK-1 | US | | 1930 | | | Cirrus Air Derby |
| Folkerts SK-2 | US | | 1936 | | | National Air Races |
| Folkerts SK-3 | US | | 1937 | | | Greve Trophy |
| Folkerts SK-4 | US | | 1938 | | | National Air Races |
| Gloster Bamel | UK | | 1921 | | | Flight airspeed record |
| Gloster II | UK | | 1924 | | | Schneider Trophy |
| Gloster III | UK | | 1925 | | | Schneider Trophy |
| Gloster IV | UK | | 1927 | | | Schneider Trophy |
| Goodyear F2G Corsair | US | | 1945 | | | Reno Air Races |
| Granville Gee Bee Sportster (X, B, C, D, E, F) | US | | 1930 | | | Cirrus Air Derby |
| Granville Gee Bee Model Y Senior Sportster | US | | 1931 | | | 1933 Chicago International Races |
| Granville Gee Bee Model Z Super Sportster | US | | 1931 | | | Thompson Trophy |
| Granville Gee Bee Model R Super Sportster | US | | 1932 | | | Thompson Trophy |
| Granville Gee Bee R-6 International Super Sportster | US | | 1934 | | | MacRobertson Air Race |
| Grumman F8F Bearcat | US | | 1944 | | | Reno Air Races |
| Hanriot H-131 | France | | 1933 | | | |
| Hawker Sea Fury | UK | | 1945 | | | Reno Air Races |
| Hawks Miller HM-1 | US | | 1936 | | | Thompson Trophy |
| Heath Baby Bullet | US | | 1928 | | | National Air Races |
| Heinkel He 64 | Germany | | 1932 | | | Challenge International de Tourisme 1932 |
| Howard DGA-3 | US | | 1930 | | | National Air Races |
| Howard DGA-4 | US | | 1932 | | | National Air Races |
| Howard DGA-6 | US | | 1934 | | | Bendix Trophy |
| Hughes H-1 Racer | US | | 1935 | | | Flight airspeed record |
| Israel Redhead | US | | 1932 | | | 1932 National Air Races |
| Kawanishi K-2 | Japan | | 1921 | | | Speed trials |
| Laird Solution | US | | 1930 | | | Thompson Trophy |
| Laird Speedwing | US | | | | | |
| Laird Speedwing Junior | US | | | | | |
| Laird Super Solution | US | | 1931 | | | Bendix Trophy |
| Laird-Turner Meteor LTR-14 | US | | 1936 | | | Thompson Trophy |
| Letov Š-8 | Czechoslovakia | | 1923 | | | Cenu prezidenta republiky |
| LeVier Cosmic Wind | US | | 1947 | | | Formula One Air Racing |
| Lockheed Vega | US | | 1927 | | | Dole Air Race |
| Lockheed Orion | US | | 1931 | | | Bendix Trophy |
| Lockheed P-38 Lightning | US | | 1946 | | | Bendix Trophy |
| Loose Special | US | | 1933 | | | Thompson Trophy |
| Martinsyde Semiquaver | UK | | 1920 | | | Gordon Bennett Trophy |
| Macchi M.7bis | Italy | | 1918 | | | Schneider Trophy |
| Macchi M.17 | Italy | | 1922 | | | Schneider Trophy |
| Macchi M.33 | Italy | | 1925 | | | Schneider Trophy |
| Macchi M.39 | Italy | | 1926 | | | Schneider Trophy |
| Macchi M.52 | Italy | | 1927 | | | Schneider Trophy |
| Macchi M.67 | Italy | | 1929 | | | Schneider Trophy |
| Macchi M.C.72 | Italy | | 1931 | | | Schneider Trophy |
| Mace-Trefethen R-2 | US | | 1970 | | | Reno Air Races |
| Messerschmitt Bf 109 | Germany | | 1935 | | | Zürich air races of 1937 |
| Messerschmitt Bf 209 | Germany | | 1938 | | | Flight airspeed record |
| Miles & Atwood special | US | | 1933 | | | 1934 Greve Trophy |
| Miller Little Gem | US | | 1949 | | | Midget Class racing |
| Monnett Sonerai | US | | 1971 | | | Formula V Air Racing |
| Monocoupe 110 Special | US | | 1931 | | | National Air Races |
| Morane-Saulnier G | France | | 1912 | | | Schneider Trophy |
| Morane-Saulnier H | France | | 1913 | | | Wiener Neustadt International Air Meet |
| Mustang Aeronautics Midget Mustang | US | | 1948 | | | Cleveland Air Race |
| Napier-Heston Racer | UK | | 1940 | | 1 | Flight airspeed record |
| Navy-Wright NW | US | | 1922 | | | Pulitzer Trophy |
| Nieuport II | France | | 1910 | | | Gordon Bennett Trophy |
| Nieuport IV.H | France | | 1912 | | | Saint-Malo race |
| Nieuport VI.H | France | | 1913 | | | Schneider Trophy |
| Nieuport-Delage NiD 29V & 29Vbis | France | | 1920 | | | Flight airspeed record |
| Nieuport-Delage NiD 29SHV | France | | 1919 | | | Schneider Trophy |
| Nieuport-Delage NiD 37 'Course' | France | | 1922 | | | Coupe Deutsch de la Meurthe |
| Nieuport-Delage Sesquiplan | France | | 1921 | | | Coupe Deutsch de la Meurthe |
| Nieuport-Delage NiD 42S | France | | 1924 | | | Coupe Beaumont |
| North American P-51 Mustang | US | | 1940 | | | Bendix Trophy |
| North American T-6 Texan | US | | 1935 | | | National Air Races |
| Northrop Gamma | US | | 1932 | | | Bendix Trophy |
| Owl Racer OR65-2 | US | | 1969 | | | Formula One Air Racing |
| Pearson Williams Mr. Smoothie | US | | 1938 | | | Thompson Trophy |
| Precious Metal | US | | 1988 | | | Reno Air Races |
| Percival Mew Gull | UK | | 1934 | | | King's Cup Race |
| Piaggio P.7 | Italy | | 1927 | Project | | |
| Potez 53 | France | | 1933 | | | Coupe Deutsch de la Meurthe |
| Rider R-1 | US | | 1931 | | | 1931 Los Angeles Air Fiesta |
| Rider R-2 | US | | 1931 | | | 1931 National Air Races |
| Rider R-3 Marcoux-Bromberg Special | US | | 1934 | On exhibit | 1 | 1935 and 1937Bendix Trophy, 1936-1939 Thompson Trophy Races |
| Rider R-5 | US | | 1936 | | | National Air Races |
| Rider R-6 | US | | 1938 | | | Greve Trophy |
| Rollason Beta | UK | | 1967 | | | Formula One Air Racing |
| RWD-6 | Poland | | 1930 | | | Challenge International de Tourisme 1930 |
| RWD-9 | Poland | | 1934 | | | Challenge International de Tourisme 1934 |
| Savoia S.12 | Italy | | 1920 | | | Schneider Trophy |
| Savoia-Marchetti S.65 | Italy | | 1929 | | | Schneider Trophy |
| Savoia-Marchetti S.79SC Corsa | Italy | | 1934 | | | Istres-Damascus-Paris Air Race |
| Scaled Composites Pond Racer | US | | 1991 | | | Reno Air Races |
| Seguin Wasabi Special | US | | 2013 | | | Reno Air Races |
| Seversky SEV-1S | US | | 1937 | | | Bendix Trophy |
| Sharp Nemesis | US | | 1991 | | | Reno Air Races |
| Sharp Nemesis NXT | US | | 2004 | | | Reno Air Races |
| Short Crusader | UK | | 1927 | | | Schneider Trophy |
| SIAI S.17 | Italy | | 1920 | | | Schneider Trophy |
| SIAI S.19 | Italy | | 1920 | | | Schneider Trophy |
| SIAI S.21 | Italy | | 1921 | | | Schneider Trophy |
| SIAI S.22 | Italy | | 1921 | | | Schneider Trophy |
| SIAI S.51 | Italy | | 1922 | | | Schneider Trophy |
| Sopwith 1919 Schneider Cup Seaplane | UK | | 1919 | | | Schneider Trophy |
| Sopwith Tabloid | UK | | 1914 | | | Schneider Trophy |
| SPAD S.20bis | France | | 1918 | | | Coupe Deutsch de la Meurthe |
| Springfield Bulldog | US | | 1932 | | | National Air Races |
| Springfield Cicada | US | | 1932 | | | Niagara Falls Manufacturer's Trophy Race |
| Supermarine Sea Lion I | UK | | 1919 | | | Schneider Trophy |
| Supermarine Sea Lion II | UK | | 1922 | | | Schneider Trophy |
| Supermarine S.4 | UK | | 1925 | | | Schneider Trophy |
| Supermarine S.5 | UK | | 1927 | | | Schneider Trophy |
| Supermarine S.6 | UK | | 1929 | | | Schneider Trophy |
| Supermarine S.6B | UK | | 1931 | | | Schneider Trophy |
| Supermarine Spitfire | UK | | 1936 | | | |
| Swallow Monoplane | US | | 1927 | | | Dole Air Race |
| Thomas-Morse R-5 | US | | 1922 | | | Pulitzer Trophy |
| Tilbury Flash Racer | US | | 1930 | | | National Air Races |
| Travel Air 5000 | US | | 1926 | | | Dole Air Race |
| Travel Air Type R Mystery Ship | US | | 1929 | | | Thompson Trophy |
| Tsunami Racer | US | | 1986 | | | Reno Air Races |
| Verville-Packard R-1 | US | | 1919 | | | Pulitzer Trophy |
| Verville-Sperry R-3 | US | | 1922 | | | Pulitzer Trophy |
| Vought F4U Corsair | US | | 1940 | | | Bendix Trophy |
| VSR SR-1 Snoshoo | US | | 1997 | | | Formula One Air Racing |
| Wedell-Williams Model 22 | US | | 1930 | | | Cirrus Air Derby |
| Wedell-Williams Model 44 | US | | 1930 | | | National Air Races |
| Wedell-Williams Model 45 | US | | 1933 | | | Bendix Trophy |
| Williams W-17 Stinger | US | | 1971 | | | Formula One Air Racing |
| Wittman Chief Oshkosh | US | | 1931 | | | National Air Races |
| Wittman D-12 Bonzo | US | | 1935 | | | National Air Races |
| Wittman Little Bonzo | US | | 1948 | | | Formula One Air Racing |
| Wittman V-Witt | US | | 1970 | | | Formula V Air Racing |
| Wright Model R | US | | 1910 | | | Gordon Bennett Trophy |
| Wright F2W | US | | 1923 | | | Pulitzer Trophy |
| Yakovlev Yak-11 | USSR | | 1945 | | | Reno Air Races |
