= Air Race E =

Air racing championship

Air Race E World Cup
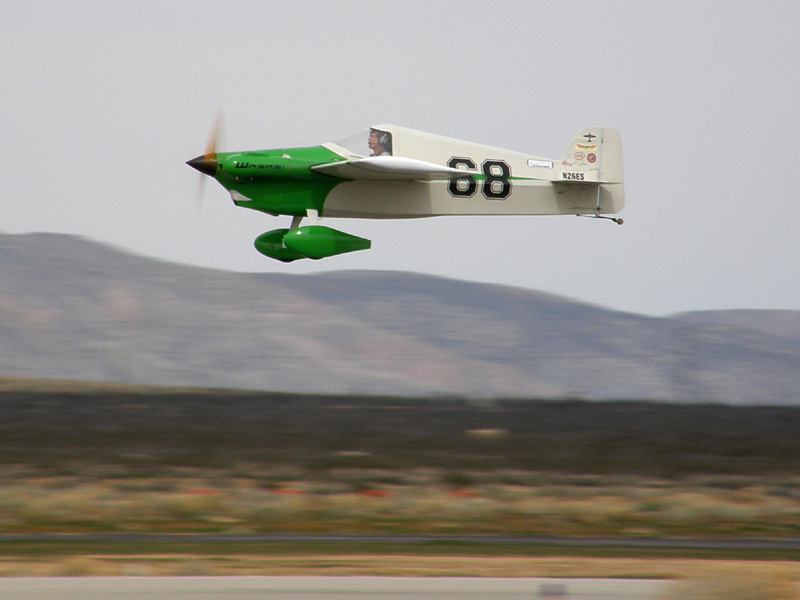
- A Cassutt Special, a piston engined racing aircraft similar to the type of aircraft that will be used in Air Race E
- Category: Air Racing
- Teams: 4 declared (16 max)

The Air Race E World Cup (also known as Air Race E) is a planned air racing championship run to Formula One rules and adapted for purely electric aircraft. Entrants will design and build electric aircraft to take part in races, flying in groups of 8 around a 5 km oval course marked by 'pylons' at speeds in excess of 250 mph. The series is backed by Airbus, who signed on as founding partner in February 2019. The inaugural series was initially announced for 2020 and but was delayed due to the global COVID-19 pandemic.

== History ==
Air Race E was announced in April 2018 by Jeff Zaltman, CEO of Air Race Events who also run the Air Race 1 Cup for Formula One Air Racing. It was announced that Air Race E would be a sister championship also run to Formula One Air Racing rules and sanctioned by the Formula Air Racing Association (FARA) and Association des Pilotes d’Avions de Formules (APAF). In November 2018, it was announced that the University of Nottingham, a UK university, would build the first Air Race E plane by converting a Cassutt III aircraft to electric propulsion. This aircraft would serve as an experimental test bed to help inform the organisers in the creation of the series.

February 2019 saw the European aerospace multinational, Airbus, announce a global partnership with Air Race E, becoming a founding partner for the series. Airbus's primary role will be to work with both Air Race E and other Air Race E partners to help shape the exact format and technical regulations for the inaugural season in 2020.

In June 2019, the first four teams to enter Air Race E were announced, originating from the countries of the USA, the Netherlands and the UK.

As of July 2019, Air Race E is officially seeking applications from potential cities to be hosts for the races.

On 28 January 2022, the first flight of a piloted electric race plane was achieved by the Nordic Air Racing Team.

== Classes ==
Air Race E has three classes:

- Open class: Air Race E's original race airplane formula has been renamed the Open Class. In this class, any and all manufacturers can produce their own unique powertrain configurations up to 150 kW power.
- Performance class: Based on a standardized electric powertrain for all racers, but it does allow for modifications of the powertrain. The rules are nearly identical as those for the open class.
- Vertical class: This class is for VTOL aircraft and will be the world's first VTOL air race. The rules still need to be clarified by Air Race E.

== Format ==
The races will be held in host cities around the world, with races at each city forming one round of an Air Race E season. The team with the most points over the season will win the Air Race E World Cup. In the inaugural season, at least one race event will score points towards the World Cup, with the remaining races forming stand-alone events.

Air Race E say that it will follow the race format of Formula One pylon air racing. This means that eight race planes will race on an oval course marked out by 'Pylons' which the aircraft must fly around. The oval course will be approximately 5 km in length and racers will have to complete 5 laps from a standing start. The first of the 8 race planes to cross the finish line will be declared the winner.

It is expected that a comparable level of performance to Formula One Air Racing will be achievable using a similar ruleset adapted for electric propulsion. As such, Air Race E aircraft are expected to have a power output in the 100-150 kW range (130-200 HP) and weigh approximately 300–350 kg. Speeds in excess of 400 km/h (250 mph) are predicted by Air Race E.

Parallels have been drawn between Air Race E and the automotive racing series Formula E (also a relatively recent player in its field having started holding races in 2014), particularly in regards to their intention: to spur on the development of high performance electric powertrains. Air Race E states that its core 'mission' is to:

- Develop electric propulsion technology for aircraft
- Promote green aviation
- Entertain audiences with high speed air racing

== Teams ==
Teams currently signed up to compete in the Air Race E World Cup are:

Team	Team captain	Country of origin
AllWays Air Racing	Casey Erickson	United States
Condor	Martyn Wiseman	United Kingdom
Team NL	Rick Boerma	Netherlands
Blue-BETA Racing	Kyle Clark	United States
Team Hanger-1	Adrian Schmer	Germany
Team Möbius	Carl Copeland	United States
Team Outlaw	Scott Holmes	Canada
Team Scramasaxe	Eric de Barberin-Barberini	France
Team Pie Aeronefs	Marc Umbricht	Switzerland
Nordic Air Racing Team	Øystein Solheim-Aune	Norway
Team Bandit Racing		United Kingdom

== See also ==
- Formula One Air Racing
- Reno Air Races
- Red Bull Air Race World Championship
