= Williams Aircraft Design Company =

American aircraft manufacturer

- Company type: Privately held company
- Industry: Aerospace
- Headquarters: Northridge, California, United States
- Key people: Art Williams
- Products: aircraft plans

The Williams Aircraft Design Company was an American aircraft manufacturer based in Northridge, California and run by Art Williams. The company specialized in the design of racing aircraft.

Several of Williams products were the result of collaboration with other designers. For instance the Williams-Cangie WC-1 Sundancer was designed with Carl Cangie and won first place at the 1973 Reno Air Races Formula One Class.

The Williams W-17 Stinger design captured second place at the 1973 Reno Air Races in the biplane class.

== Aircraft ==
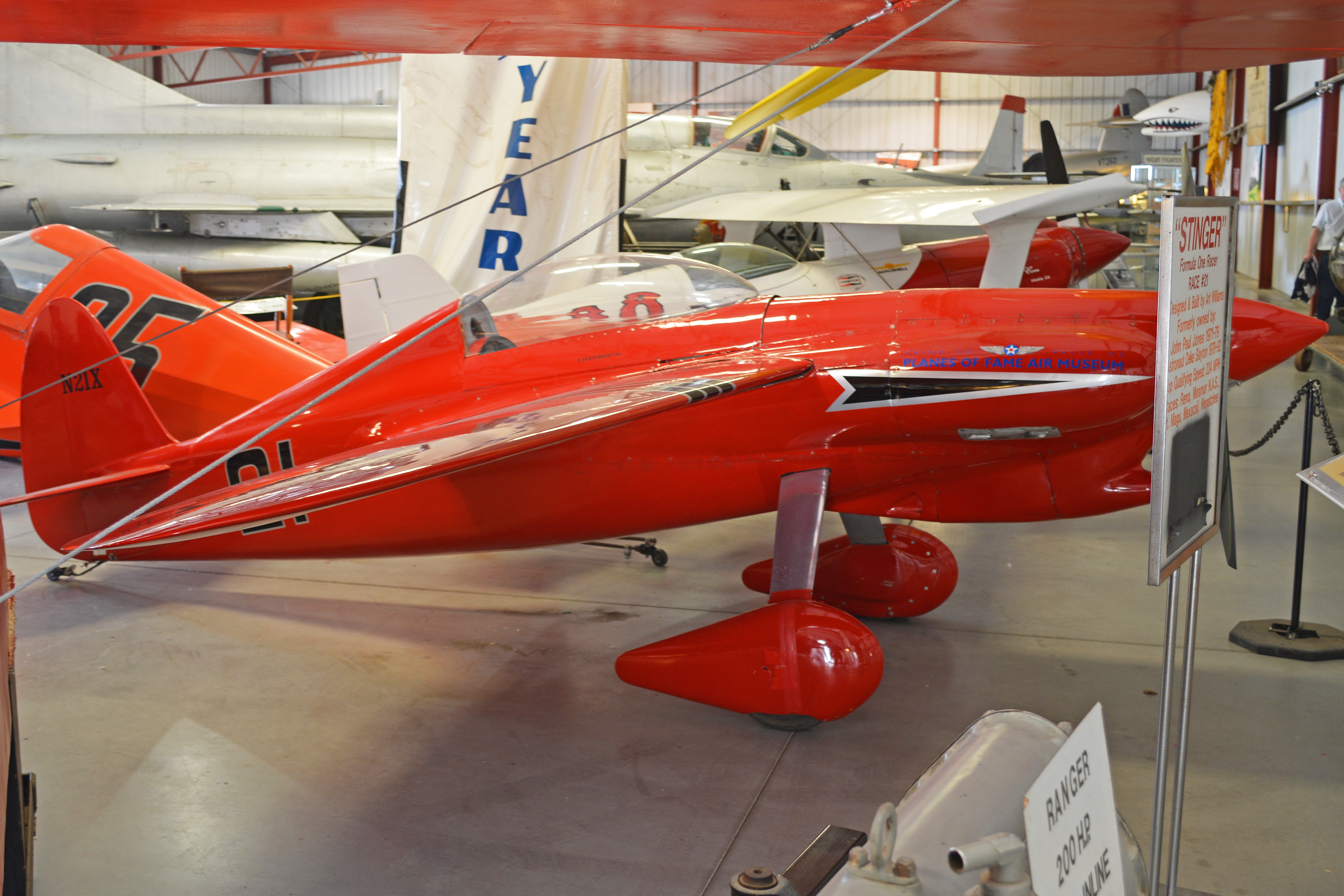
Williams W-17 Stinger

Summary of aircraft designed by the Williams Aircraft Design Company
Model name	First flight	Number built	Type
Williams W-17 Stinger	1970s	one	Formula One air racer
Williams-Cangie WC-1 Sundancer	1970s	one	Biplane air racer
Williams-Gully Special			
Williams Special			
