= Bellanca 28-92 =

28-92
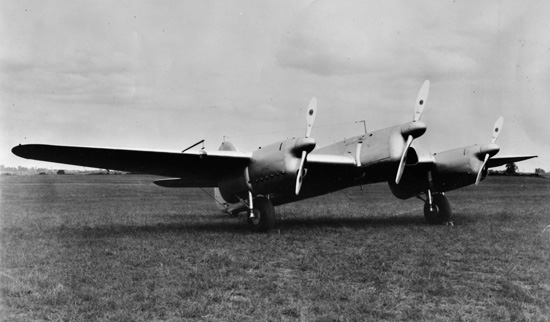

General information
- Type: Racing aircraft
- Manufacturer: Bellanca
- Number built: 1

History
- First flight: 1937

The Bellanca 28-92 Trimotor was a racing aircraft built to compete in the Istres-Damascus-Paris Air Race of 1937, and was paid for by popular subscription in Romania. Christened Alba Iulia ("White Julia", registration YR-AHA) it was piloted by Captain Alexander Papana of the Romanian Air Force .

== Design and development ==
The aircraft was a low-wing cantilever monoplane with a similar fuselage to the Bellanca 28-70 and 28-90, but was fitted with three engines, one in the nose, and one in each of two underwing nacelles. The nacelles also housed the main undercarriage units when retracted.

The fuselage was of tubular steel construction and covered by aluminum back to the cockpit. Aft of the cockpit, the fuselage was covered with fabric. The wings and tail were plywood-covered, and the control surfaces were covered by fabric. The main undercarriage partially retracted into the rear of the wing engine nacelles, but the tailwheel did not retract.

Installed in each wing of the aircraft was a 250-HP (186 kW) Menasco C6S4 Super Buccaneer engine. The C6S4 was a direct drive, air-cooled, inverted, straight-six aircraft engine. The C6S4 was supercharged and displaced 544 cu. in. (8.9 L). Each C6S4 engine drove a 6-ft. 6 in (0.15 m) diameter, two-blade, adjustable-pitch propeller.

A 420-HP (313 kW) Ranger SGV-770 engine was in the nose of the 28–92. The SGV-770 was an air-cooled, inverted, V-12 engine. The engine was supercharged, displaced 773 cu. in. (12.7 L), and had gear reduction for the 8-ft. 3 in (0.076 m) diameter, two-blade, adjustable-pitch propeller.

All of the trimotor's engines were hand cranked to start. The 28-92 had a fuel capacity of around 715 gallons (2,707 L). The aircraft had a span of 46-ft. 4 in (0.10 m), a length of 28 ft 4 in (8.64 m), and weighed 4,700 pounds (2,100 kg) empty. The 28-92 had a top speed of 285 mph (459 km/h) and a 3,000 miles (4,800 km) range at 250 mph (400 km/h) or a 4,160 miles (6,690 km) range at 200 mph (320 km/h). Landing speed was 75 mph (121 km/h).

== Operational history ==
In 1938, Bellanca re-registered the aircraft in the United States as NX2433 and entered it in the Bendix Trophy cross-country race. Frank Cordova was the pilot for the race, and the trimotor flew as race number 99. Unfortunately, because of engine trouble, the aircraft did not finish the cross-country race.

The aircraft competed in the 1939 Bendix Trophy race, placing second, piloted by Arthur Bussy. After being sold in South America, the 28-92 ended its days rotting in a small field in Ecuador.

== Specifications ==
Data from Jane's Encyclopedia of Aviation, Aerofiles

General characteristics

- Crew: 1
- Length: 27 ft 8 in (8.43 m)
- Wingspan: 46 ft 4 in (14.13 m)
- Powerplant: 1 × Ranger V-770 V-12 inverted air-cooled piston engine, 420 hp (313 kW)
- Powerplant: 2 × Menasco Buccaneer 6-cyl inverted in-line air-cooled piston engine, 251 hp (187 kW) each

Performance

- Maximum speed: 250 mph (400 km/h, 220 kn)
- Cruise speed: 225 mph (362 km/h, 196 kn)
- Ferry range: 3,000 mi (4,800 km, 2,600 nmi)

== See also ==
Aircraft of comparable role, configuration, and era

- Pander S.IV Postjager
- de Havilland DH.88 Comet
