= Art Chester =

American air racer

- Born: Art Chester; 1899
- Died: April 1949 (aged 49–50); San Diego, California
- Cause of death: Air Race Crash
- Occupation: Air racer
- Known for: Air racing

Art Chester (1899–1949) was an American barnstormer and air racer of the 1930s and 1940s. Chester was instrumental in the development of the Menasco Pirate and Buccaneer inverted inline engines. He was also the designer of the propeller spinner and engine front cowling for the North American North American P-51 fighter.

== Early life ==
In September 1930, Chester bought a Davis D-1-85 parasol, and flew it to victory in the National Air Races. He later developed a series of successful air racers named after Popeye cartoon and comic strip characters. His designs were the Chester Jeep, Chester Goon, and Chester Swee Pea. Chester's "Jeep" became a formidable racer.

Chester would tow his aircraft from race site to race site, driving a matching colored Auburn boat tailed Jeepster Chester's "Jeepster" and "Goon" were powered by Menasco Motors Company engines, which he tuned for maximum performance and reliability. Al Menasco took note of Chester's engine building and tuning skills. In 1939 Chester was hired by Menasco as an engine designer to help develop the Menasco Pirate and Buccaneer inverted inline aircraft engines.

During World War II, Chester went to work for North American Aviation as an engineer employing his racing experience on new designs.

Chester was the president of the Professional Race Pilots Association and early promoter of midget air racing, the forerunner to Formula One Air Racing. Chester died when his V-tailed racer Swee Pea II crashed in the slipstream of other racers at a San Diego meet. Chester had entered every National air race held since 1929 until his death.

Chester was inducted into the Motorsports Hall of Fame of America in 2023.
