= Chester Swee' Pea =

General information
- Type: Racing aircraft
- National origin: United States of America
- Designer: Art Chester
- Number built: 3

History
- First flight: 20 July 1947

The Swee' Pea was a series of three midget aircraft racers designed by Art Chester.

== Design and development ==
The Swee' Pea was a racing aircraft to compete in the new midget racing class championed by race pilot Art Chester. The aircraft was the third design from Chester with a Popeye comic name.

The midget racer was required to have an engine less than 190 cubic inches in displacement at the time. The Swee' Pea shared a similar short, mid-wing taildragger configuration with other midget racers. The aircraft was unique in that it used a V tail configuration and a single cooling air intake through a large hole in the center of the spinner. The Fuselage is welded tube steel with plywood covered wings.

== Operational history ==
The Swee' Pea was introduced at the 1947 National Air Races, but the V-Tail performed poorly at takeoff speed, and was replaced by a conventional tail for the 1948 Miami races. The top speed was reduced with a conventional tail, so the V-Tail was re-installed.

The Swee' Pea (now Sky Baby) was acquired by the Spirit of Flight Foundation museum in Nampa, ID and is currently on display with other Art Chester artifacts and photos.

== Variants ==
Swee' Pea
Later Renamed "Sky Baby" - one built
Swee' Pea II
Modified with a Y-tail (similar to the Sonex Waiex). Art Chester died in a crash in this plane at the San Diego Air Races on 24 April 1949. - one built
Wimpy
The Swee' Pea modified with the main gear farther back. This aircraft crashed on 25 July 1948 at Rosemead airfield, due to blanking of the v-tail during a slow manoeuvre. - one built

== Specifications (Chester Swee' Pea) ==
Data from Sport Aviation

General characteristics

- Length: 15 ft 9 in (4.80 m)
- Wingspan: 16 ft 9 in (5.11 m)
- Wing area: 71.3 sq ft (6.62 m^{2})
- Empty weight: 590 lb (268 kg)
- Powerplant: 1 × Continental C85 , 85 hp (63 kW)

Performance

- Maximum speed: 160 kn (180 mph, 290 km/h)

== See also ==
- National Air Races

Related development

- Chester Goon
- Chester Jeep
