= Snowshoe (disambiguation) =

Snowshoe can refer to:

- Snowshoe, a type of footwear.
- Snowshoe, Michigan, an unincorporated community
- Snow Shoe, Pennsylvania, a borough in Pennsylvania, United States.
- Snow Shoe Township, Pennsylvania, which surrounds the borough
- Snowshoe, West Virginia, a town in West Virginia, United States.
  - Snowshoe Mountain, a ski resort near this town.
- Snowshoe (cat), a breed of cat.
- Snowshoe hare, a type of hare.
- Snowshoe Lava Field in British Columbia, Canada
- Snowshoe Thompson, the father of California skiing.
- VSR SR-1 Snoshoo, an American Formula One racing aircraft
