= Sharp Nemesis =

Racing aircraft

Sharp DR90 Nemesis
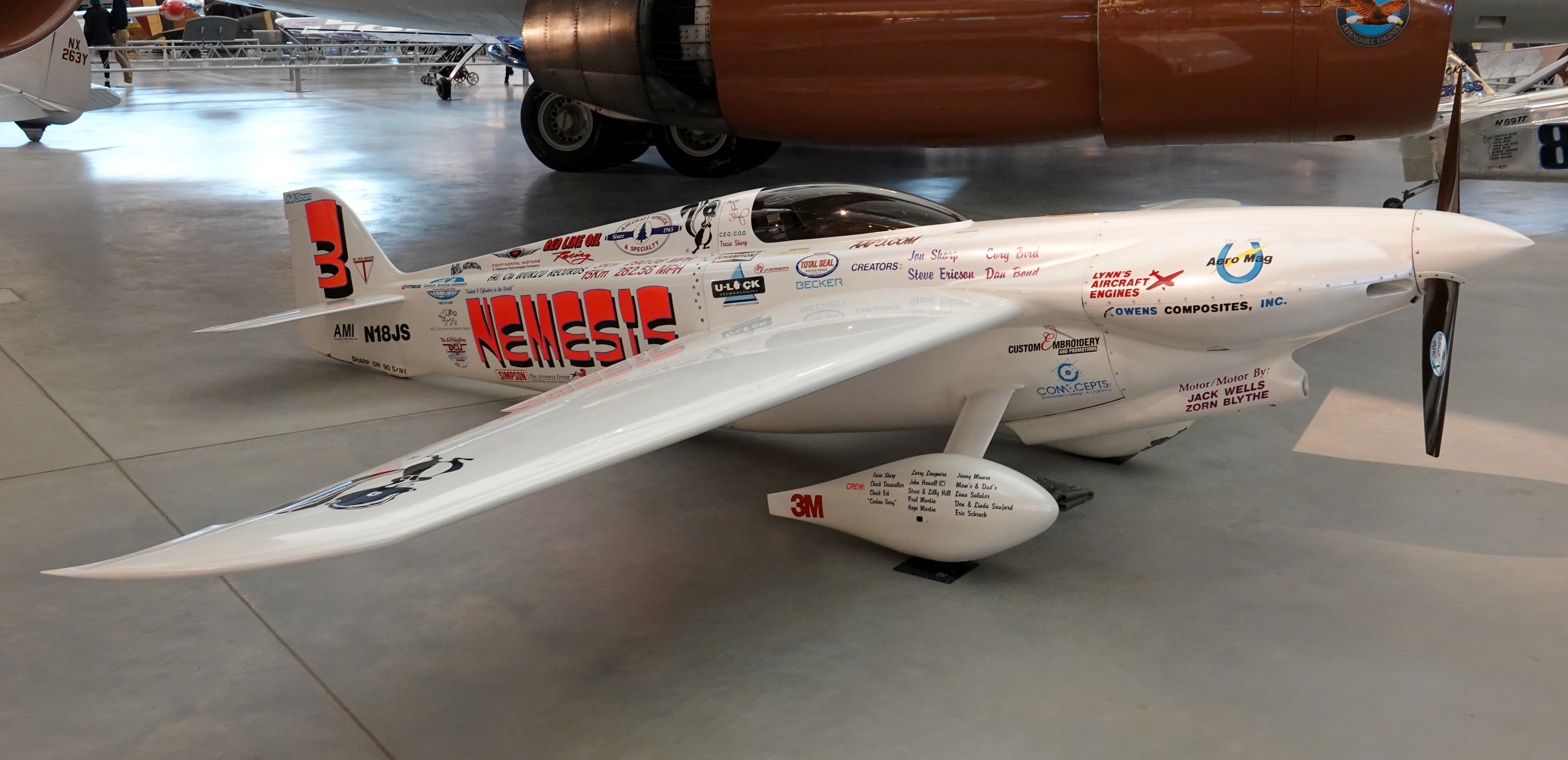
- Steven F. Udvar-Hazy Center

General information
- Type: Racing aircraft
- Manufacturer: Sharp Air Racing
- Designer: Jon Sharp
- Status: On display at the Steven F. Udvar-Hazy Center

History
- First flight: 1991
- Variant: Sharp Nemesis NXT

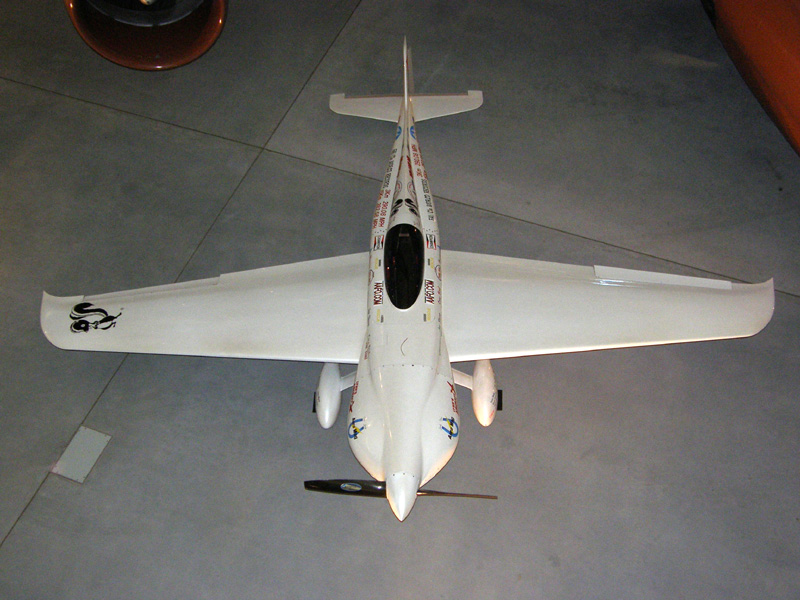
Nemesis seen from above

The Sharp DR 90 Nemesis is a Formula One racing aircraft designed by Jon Sharp and built at the Mojave Airport by the Nemesis Air Racing Team. The aircraft is powered by a modified Continental O-200 piston engine.

The Nemesis originated as an attempt by Jon Sharp to build a Shoestring racer, with composite skins over a steel frame. Along the way, Dan Bond convinced him to use an airfoil with extensive laminar flow and finally, Steve Ericson helped Jon design a sleeker, all composite airframe. All that remains of the original “plastic Shoestring” is the horizontal tail. The steel space frame was sold to Dan Gilbert, who built on it his Shadow Formula One air racer. Although Shadow looks much like Nemesis it is fabricated differently and has a completely different wing.

The success of the Nemesis aircraft led Jon Sharp to design a follow-on type, the Nemesis NXT.

== Racing career ==
Between 1991 and 1999, the plane won 45 of the 48 race events in which it was entered, including nine consecutive Reno Gold National Championships. During each of the race seasons from 1994 through 1999, Nemesis finished as the International Formula One points champion. Nemesis was awarded the George Owl Trophy for its design in 1991, three Louis Blèriot Medals from the Fédération Aéronautique Internationale (1993, 1996 and 1998), and four Pulitzer Trophies (1993, 1994, 1995 and 1999). The aircraft set 16 world speed records, and in one of those records, Nemesis flew at over 290 mph (467 km/h). Because of its successes, the National Air and Space Museum has described the plane as "the most successful aircraft in air racing history". To put the Nemesis performance in perspective, most production O-200 equipped aircraft are more commonly found flying at 100mph, and few can reach even half its maximum speed.

== Display ==
After the end of the 1999 racing season, Jon Sharp donated the aircraft to the National Air and Space Museum, and it was put on display at the NASM's Steven F. Udvar-Hazy Center in Chantilly, Virginia. Since 2022 it has been on display at the National Air and Space Museum in central Washington, DC.

== Specifications ==
General characteristics

- Crew: 1
- Capacity: 1
- Length: 18 ft 6 in (5.64 m)
- Wingspan: 21 ft 3.2 in (6.482 m)
- Height: 3 ft 4 in (1.02 m)
- Wing area: 66.6 sq ft (6.187 m^{2})
- Aspect ratio: 6.79
- Airfoil: NLF-0414F mod
- Empty weight: 520 lb (236 kg)
- Gross weight: 770 lb (350 kg)
- Powerplant: × Continental O-200 piston engine, 100 hp (75 kW) Est. 135hp+ in race trim

Performance

- Maximum speed: 290.074 mph (466.83 km/h, 252.067 kn)
- Power/mass: 0.201
- Fuel capacity: 5 US gal (18.9 liters)
- Stall speed: 90 Kias (167 km/h)
- G-Loading limits: +6, -4
- Cabin height: 35 in (89 cm)
