= Williams-Cangie WC-1 Sundancer =

American homebuilt biplane racing aircraft

WC-1 Sundancer
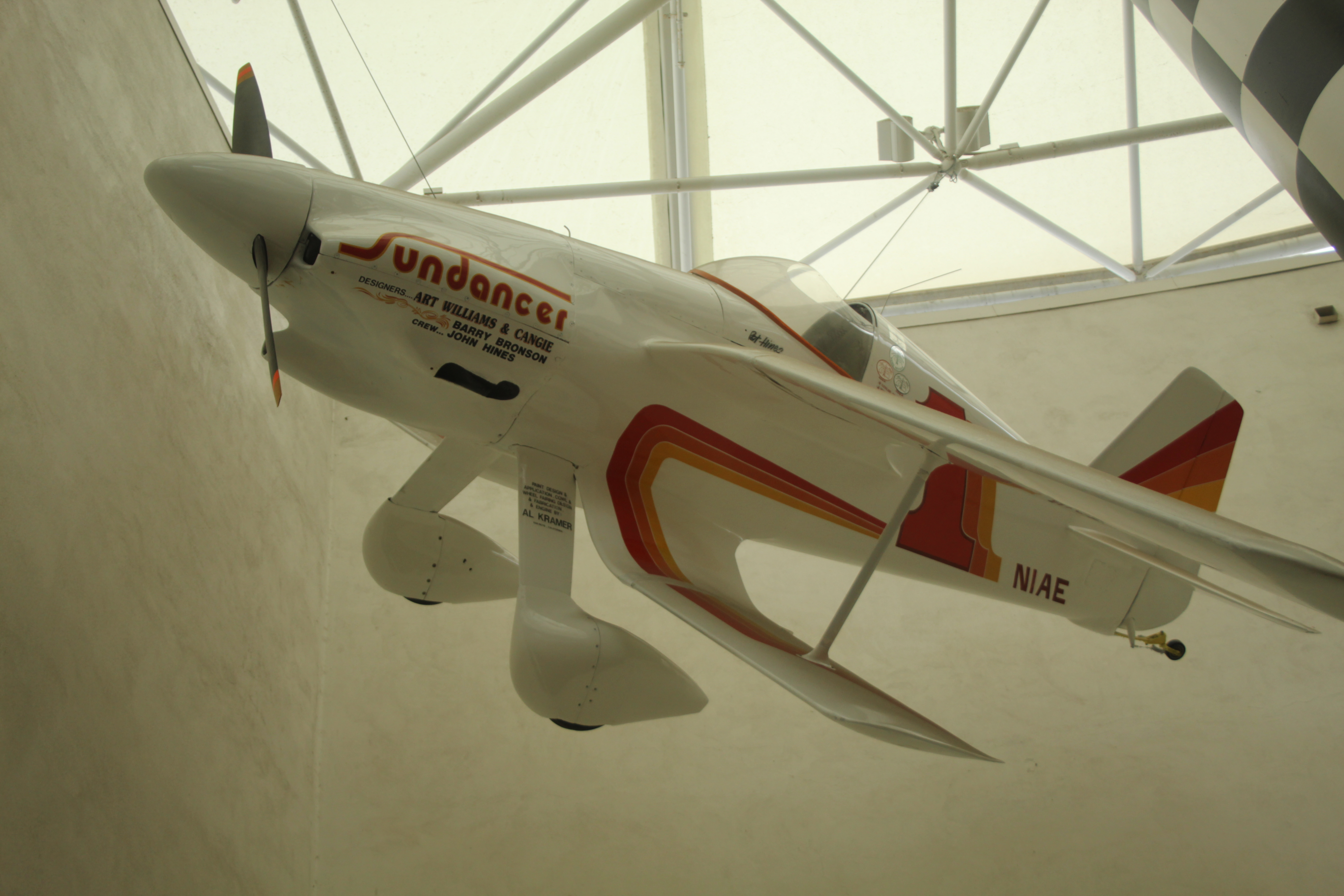
- The sole WC-1 Sundancer on display at the San Diego Air & Space Museum, 2021

General information
- Type: Racing aircraft
- National origin: United States
- Manufacturer: Ralph Thenhaus
- Designer: Art Williams and Carl Cangie
- Status: Production completed (1974)
- Number built: One

History
- First flight: 1974

The Williams-Cangie WC-1 Sundancer is an American homebuilt biplane racing aircraft that was designed by Art Williams and Carl Cangie and built by Ralph Thenhaus in 1974. Plans were at one time available from Williams' company, the Williams Aircraft Design Company of Northridge, California. Only one was built.

== Design and development ==
The WC-1 Sundancer features an unusual biplane layout, with the upper wing just below the cockpit canopy and the lower gull wing mounted at the bottom of the fuselage. The wings are joined by a single interplane strut. It has a single-seat enclosed cockpit under a bubble canopy, fixed conventional landing gear and a single engine in tractor configuration. The fuselage was derived from the Bushby Midget Mustang.

The aircraft is made from aluminum sheet, with the fuselage flush riveted stressed skin. Its 19.75 ft (6.0 m) span wing has no flaps. The engine used was the 135 hp (101 kW) Lycoming O-290-D2 powerplant.

The aircraft has an empty weight of 835 lb (379 kg) and a gross weight of 1,115 lb (506 kg), giving a useful load of 280 lb (130 kg). With full fuel of 16 U.S. gallons (61 L; 13 imp gal) the payload is 184 lb (83 kg).

On its first flight the WC-1 set a national class record of 194 mph (312 km/h).

== Operational history ==
Only one example was built. It was registered in the United States with the Federal Aviation Administration in 1974.

The WC-1 was raced by pilot Sidney White and won the biplane class at the Reno Air Races. It also won five more class races in 1974.

== Aircraft on display ==
- San Diego Air & Space Museum – sole example

== Specifications (WC-1 Sundancer) ==
Data from Plane and Pilot, Aerofiles

General characteristics

- Crew: one
- Length: 16 ft 1 in (4.90 m)
- Upper wingspan: 19 ft 9 in (6.02 m)
- Lower wingspan: 12 ft 9 in (3.89 m)
- Empty weight: 835 lb (379 kg)
- Gross weight: 1,115 lb (506 kg)
- Fuel capacity: 16 U.S. gallons (61 L; 13 imp gal)
- Powerplant: 1 × Lycoming O-290-D2 four cylinder, air-cooled, four stroke aircraft engine, 135 hp (101 kW)
- Propellers: 2-bladed metal

Performance

- Maximum speed: 235 mph (378 km/h, 204 kn)
- Stall speed: 65 mph (105 km/h, 56 kn)
