= Christensen Zipper =

Zipper

General information
- Type: Air racer
- National origin: United States
- Designer: Harvey Christensen

History
- Introduction date: 1948

The Christensen Zipper is an air racer that was built to compete in the Goodyear midget air races.

== Design and development ==
The Christensen Zipper was developed by Harvey Christensen and was patterned after Steve Wittman's Bonzo and Buster midget racers.

The Zipper is a single-place, mid-winged aircraft with conventional landing gear. The fuselage was constructed from welded steel tubing with fabric covering. The wing used two wooden spars with strut wire bracing and fabric covering.

== Operational history ==
During the 1948 National Air Races the aircraft was disqualified due to a spar structure inspection.

In the 1949 National Air Races the Zipper flew with the race number 59, sponsored by Rich-O-Root Beer with a qualifying run of 156.245 mph (251 km/h). Christensen flew to third place, but landed one lap early after seeing the checkered flag for a competitor who had lapped him. The Zipper fell to tenth place for landing early.

== Specifications (Zipper) ==
Data from AAHS Journal

General characteristics

- Crew: 1
- Powerplant: 1 × Continental C-85
- Propellers: 2-bladed aluminum propeller

Performance

- Maximum speed: 156.245 mph (251.452 km/h, 135.773 kn)

== See also ==
Aircraft of comparable role, configuration, and era

- Wittman Buster
