= Keleher Lark =

JK-1 Lark

General information
- Type: Sport aircraft
- National origin: United States
- Manufacturer: Homebuilt
- Designer: James J. Keleher

The Keleher JK-1 Lark is a single-seat aerobatic sport aircraft that was designed in the United States in the early 1960s and later marketed for homebuilding. It is a conventional, mid-wing, strut-braced monoplane with fixed tailwheel undercarriage. The fuselage and empennage are of welded steel tube construction, skinned in fabric. The wings are wooden and also covered in fabric. The design was revised in 1963, with the new version designated Lark 1B. Plans for this version were offered for sale from 1968 and were still on sale into the 1980s. An example of the 1B won the "Outstanding Workmanship" award for L. C. Koetkemeyer at the 1968 EAA Fly-in.

As of 2008, six remained registered in the United States.

== Specifications ==
General characteristics

- Crew: One pilot
- Length: 17 ft 0 in (5.18 m)
- Wingspan: 23 ft 0 in (7.01 m)
- Height: 5 ft 5 in (1.65 m)
- Wing area: 81 sq ft (7.5 m^{2})
- Empty weight: 550 lb (249 kg)
- Gross weight: 855 lb (387 kg)
- Powerplant: 1 × Various flat-4 engines , 65 hp (49 kW)

Performance

- Maximum speed: 132 mph (212 km/h, 115 kn)
- Service ceiling: 19,500 ft (5,950 m)
- Rate of climb: 900 ft/min (4.6 m/s)

Aircraft of comparable role, configuration, and era

- Cassutt Special
