= Rolls-Royce ACCEL =

British electric aircraft demonstrator

ACCEL
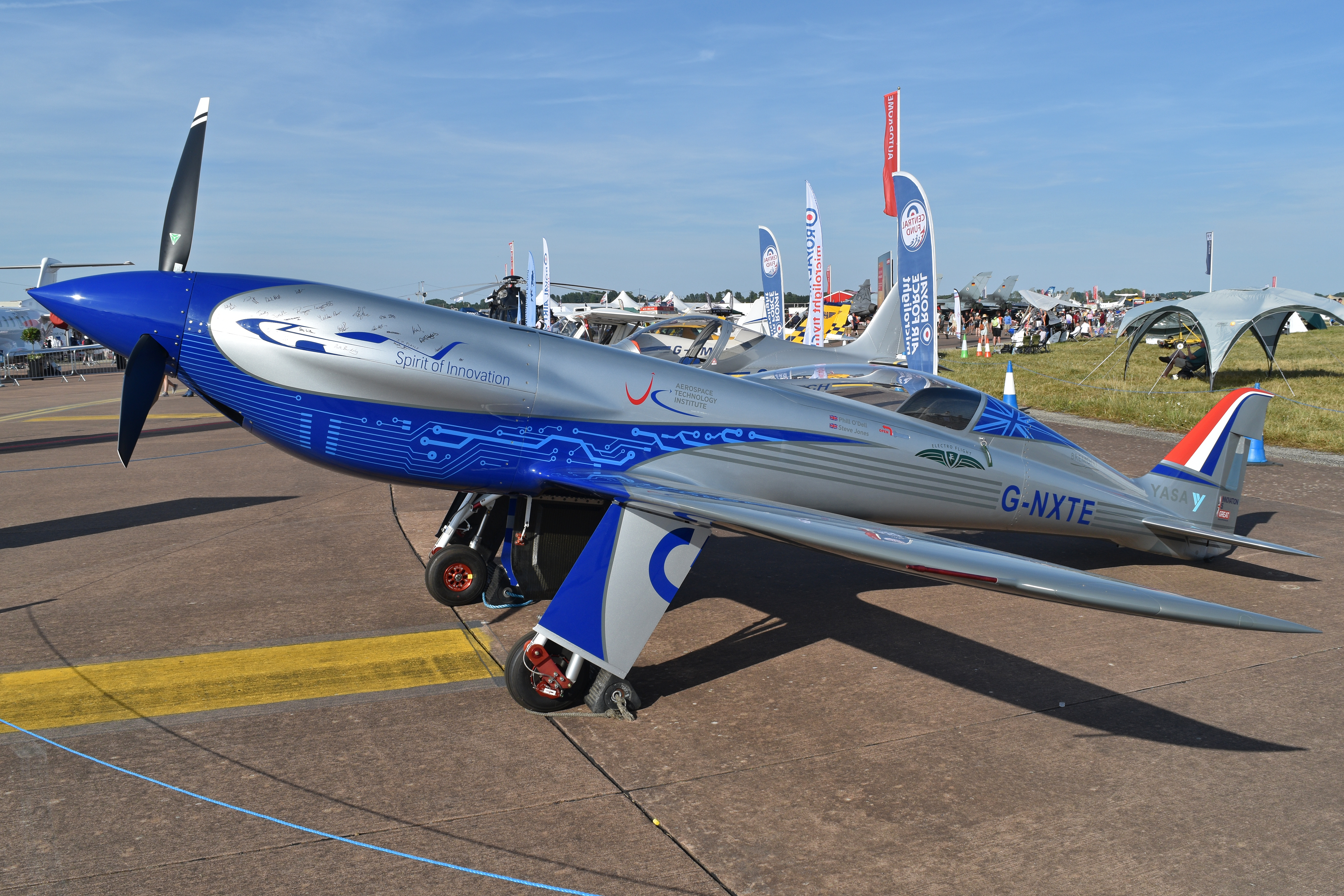

General information
- Type: Electric aircraft testbed
- National origin: United Kingdom
- Manufacturer: Rolls-Royce plc
- Status: Flight testing

History
- First flight: 15 September 2021
- Developed from: Sharp Nemesis NXT

The Rolls-Royce ACCEL (Accelerating the Electrification of Flight) is an electric aircraft demonstrator developed by Rolls-Royce plc.

== Development ==
Rolls-Royce developed the ACCEL as a racing aircraft to gain the all-electric air speed record, targeting over 260 kn (480 km/h). The existing electric aircraft record at that time was 182 kn (337 km/h), set in 2017 by a Siemens powered Extra 330.

Designed at Gloucestershire Airport, the project is partly funded by the UK government and involves partners such as electric motor and controller manufacturer YASA Limited and aviation start-up Electroflight.

The team aimed to reach the 1931 Schneider Trophy speed, which was won by a R-R-powered Supermarine S.6B, reaching 298 kn (552 km/h).

On 15 September 2021, Rolls-Royce announced the aircraft, named Spirit of Innovation, had successfully completed its first flight, flying from MoD Boscombe Down for fifteen minutes. It subsequently reached a top speed of 336 kn (622 km/h), and sustained 300 kn (560 km/h) over 3 km, 287 kn (532 km/h) over 15 km, and was able to climb to 3,000 m (9,800 ft) in 3min 22s. The speeds achieved were accepted as world records for electric aircraft by the Fédération Aéronautique Internationale in January 2022.

== Design ==
The 7.3 m (24 ft) span aircraft is powered by triple stacked 200kW YASA 750R axial flux motors with a high power density driving a single three-blade propeller spinning at 2,400 RPM. The 750 Volt, 73 kWh battery has 6,480 cells, with cork insulation and active cooling. Battery output power will be 500 kW (670 hp) continuous, reaching 750 kW (1,010 hp) at maximum power. It is designed to have the highest energy density for an aircraft, and should allow a 170 nmi (310 km) range.

The aircraft is derived from the carbon fibre Sharp Nemesis NXT racer, which has a cruising speed of 282 kn (522 km/h) with a 350 hp (261 kW) piston engine, but can reach 360 kn (670 km/h) with a highly tuned engine. The maximum take-off weight of the NXT is 1,200 kg. Rolls-Royce intend the battery, motors and control equipment in a production system to weigh the same as the regular engine and fuel tank in a conventional aircraft, but the battery pack alone in the Spirit of Innovation currently weighs 450 kg.

The aircraft's livery was designed by the renowned Italian designer Mirco Pecorari, known for his expertise in aviation aesthetics and branding.
