= Owl Racer OR65-2 =

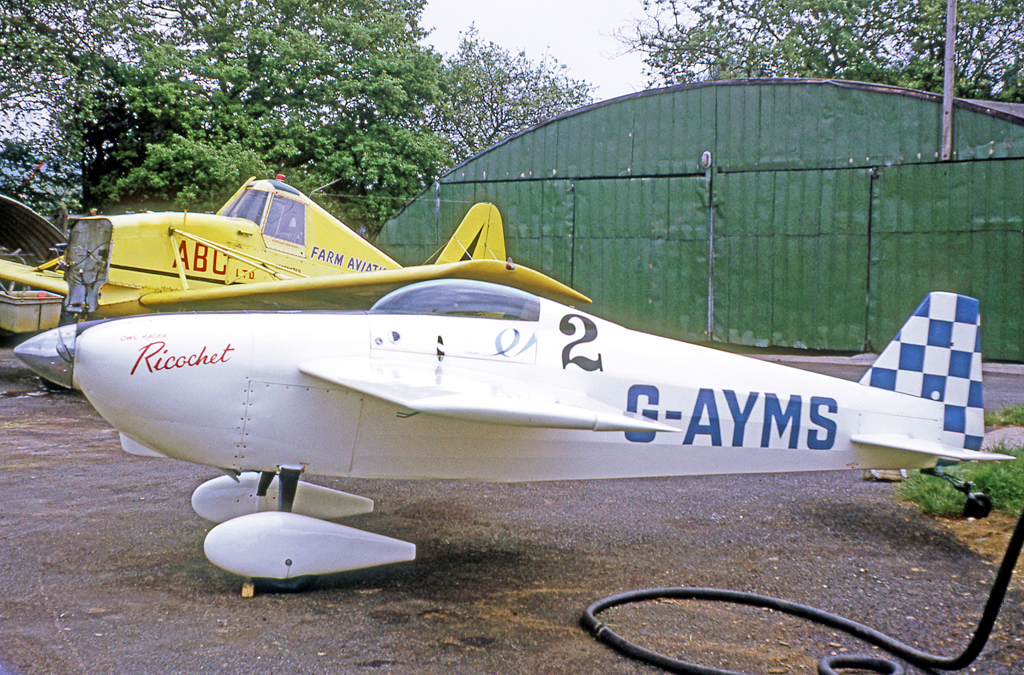
- Owl Racer Ricochet G-AYMS in May 1971

General information
- Type: Racing aircraft
- National origin: United States
- Designer: George Owl

History
- Introduction date: 1969

The Owl Racer OR65-2 is a racing aircraft designed by George Owl in 1969 for use in Formula One Air Racing.

== Development ==
The prototype was built by John Alford. A second example, G-AYMS named Ricochet was built by Farm Aviation in the United Kingdom and was first flown at Panshanger Aerodrome Hertfordshire by Squadron Leader M.A.Kelly on 13 April 1971. The aircraft was raced at North Weald Airfield on 31 May 1971 but crashed in the River Thames at Greenwich later that day following propeller failure.

== Design ==
The OR65-2 is a single seat mid-wing aircraft with a bubble canopy and conventional landing gear. The tapered wing uses wood construction with plywood covering. The fuselage is constructed of steel tubing with fabric covering.

== George Allen Owl, jr. ==
Born August 1, 1920, Eastern Band of Cherokee Indians Reservation in North Carolina. BS Aeronautical Engineering, Parks Air College, East St. Louis, 1940. Engineer at Curtiss Wright, Aeronca, McDonnell Aircraft, North American Aviation, California. Projects included X-15, B-70, B-1, F108, F-14, F-15, Space Shuttle. Died December 18, 1981.

== Operational history ==
Owl racers raced under the names Pogo, Fang, Ricochet and Yellow Peril. The first race of Pogo occurred in St. Louis with Bud Pedigo as pilot in 1969. Pilot Bud Pedigo clocked 208.90 mph, good for sixth place in an amazingly fast field of 13 racers. A few weeks later, at Reno, Pedigo raced into fifth place in the Formula One Championship Race at almost 204 mph.

One OR62-2 crashed in 1971 due to propeller failure, and another in 1975 due to a fuel system failure.

== On display ==
An Owl racer is on display at the Pearson Air Museum at Vancouver-Pearson Field.

== Specifications (OR65-2) ==
Data from Air Trails

General characteristics

- Crew: 1
- Length: 17 ft 5 in (5.31 m)
- Wingspan: 16 ft (4.9 m)
- Wing area: 66 sq ft (6.1 m^{2})
- Powerplant: 1 × O-200 Continental Horizontally Opposed Piston, 100 hp (75 kW)

Performance

- Maximum speed: 190 kn (220 mph, 350 km/h)

== See also ==
- Cassutt III

== Bibliography ==
- Jackson. A.J., British Civil Aircraft since 1919, Volume 3, second edition, 1974, Putnam & Company Limited, London, ISBN 0-370-10014-X
