= Sharp Nemesis NXT =

Kit-built sportplane

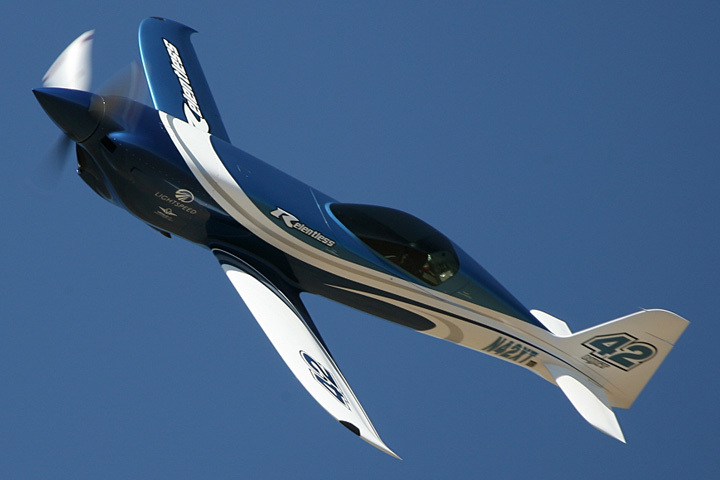

General information
- Type: Racing aircraft
- Manufacturer: Air-C-Race
- Designer: Jon Sharp

History
- First flight: 10 July 2004
- Developed from: Sharp Nemesis
- Developed into: Rolls-Royce ACCEL

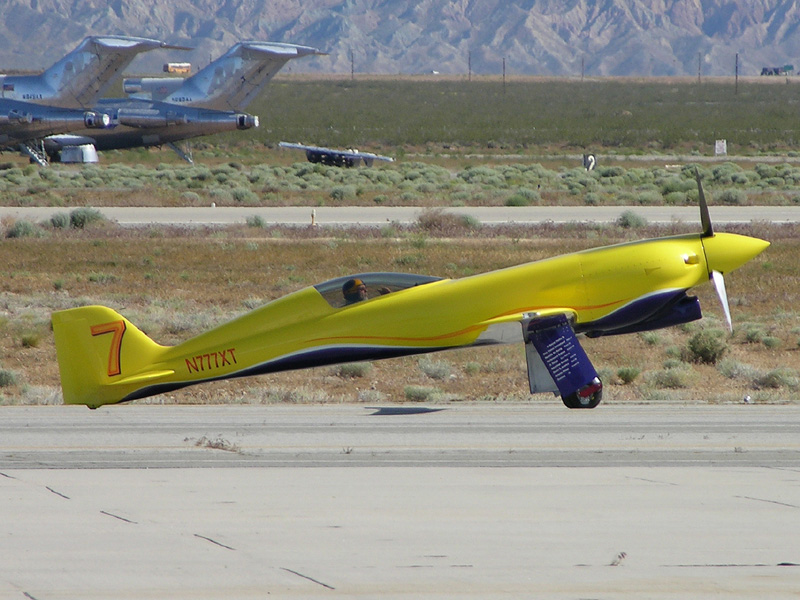
A Dan Wright build taxis at Mojave

The Sharp Nemesis NXT with "NXT" standing for "Neoteric experimental Technology," is a kit-built sport-class aircraft designed specifically for air racing. It serves as a successor to the previous model, the Sharp Nemesis, and was created by Jon Sharp, the president of Nemesis Air Racing. The Nemesis NXT is a single-engine, low-wing aircraft with retractable gear and seating for two individuals. The original design of the aircraft incorporates a Lycoming TIO-540-NXT Thunderbolt six-cylinder engine for propulsion.

In 2011, the German company Air-C-Race assumed the role of the official builder for remote control (RC) models of the Nemesis NXT, expanding its presence beyond the full-scale version of the aircraft.

== Racing history ==
The prototype Nemesis NXT, bearing the race number 3X (N333XT) and piloted by Jon Sharp, achieved a significant victory by winning the 2008 Reno Air Races Sport Class championship. During this competition, the aircraft established a new record speed for the race, reaching an impressive 392 mph (631 km/h). Throughout the ten-day event, Sharp set a heat record of 393 mph (632 km/h) and, during the qualification stage, achieved a record-breaking speed of 409.297 mph (658.700 km/h). This marked the first time a racer in this particular class had surpassed the 400 mph (640 km/h) speed barrier, a feat typically associated with Unlimited Class racing aircraft. Additionally, a second Nemesis NXT, designated as race number 42 and fielded by Relentless Racing, secured a respectable fifth-place finish, achieving an average speed of 336.526 mph (541.586 km/h) during the gold race.

Jon Sharp, having accumulated the highest number of wins in the history of racing, announced his retirement from Pylon Racing in August 2011. In 2015, he received an invitation to donate his prototype Nemesis NXT to the National Air and Space Museum. The aircraft was subsequently delivered in 2018 by Crew Chief Steve Hill and race pilot Justin Phillipson. Initially, museum directors intended to exhibit the aircraft in the Nation of Speed gallery at the museum's central location. However, due to its size, it was determined that the aircraft could not fit through the access door of that particular building. Consequently, the Nemesis NXT was relocated to the Steven F. Udvar-Hazy Center in Fairfax County, Virginia. It is currently on permanent display (as of 2022) in the Boeing Aviation Hangar, where it stands alongside its older counterpart, the Nemesis. The livery of the aircraft on display at the Smithsonian National Air and Space Museum in Washington, which won the Super Sport category in 2009, was designed by Italian designer Mirco Pecorari.

== Records ==
On 30 July 2008, Sharp set an FAI class C1b world record for speed over a straight 3 km (1.9 mi) course at 573.46 km/h (356.33 mph).

On 20 September 2009, Sharp won the Super Sport Gold race at Reno with a speed of 407.061 mph (655.101 km/h).

On 16 September 2009, Sharp qualified first with a speed of 412.554 mph (663.941 km/h) for the top spot in the Super Sport class at Reno.

On 17 September 2009, Sharp set a Super Sport race record of 383.292 mph (616.849 km/h).

On 18 September 2009, Sharp beat the previous day's record with a speed of 399.336 mph (642.669 km/h).

On 19 September 2009, the aircraft reached 406.051 mph (653.476 km/h), the first homebuilt aircraft to exceed 400 mph (640 km/h) average race speed on the Reno course.

On 20 September 2009, Sharp won the Super Sport Gold race at a record speed of 407.061 mph (655.101 km/h). He earned his 15th National Championship (another record) completing the "Record a Day and Two on Sunday" Reno campaign of 2009.

In September–October 2015 Sharp set five FAI records for piston aircraft at Moriarty, New Mexico; all are current in 2022:

- In the under-1000 kg weight class C1b, average 393 miles/hour for four 3-km runs at low altitude; and 406 miles/hour for two 15 km runs at unrestricted altitude
- In the under-1750 kg weight class C1c, average 415 miles/hr on the 3-km course, 407 miles/hr on the 15 km, and 397 miles/hr for a 100 km circuit.

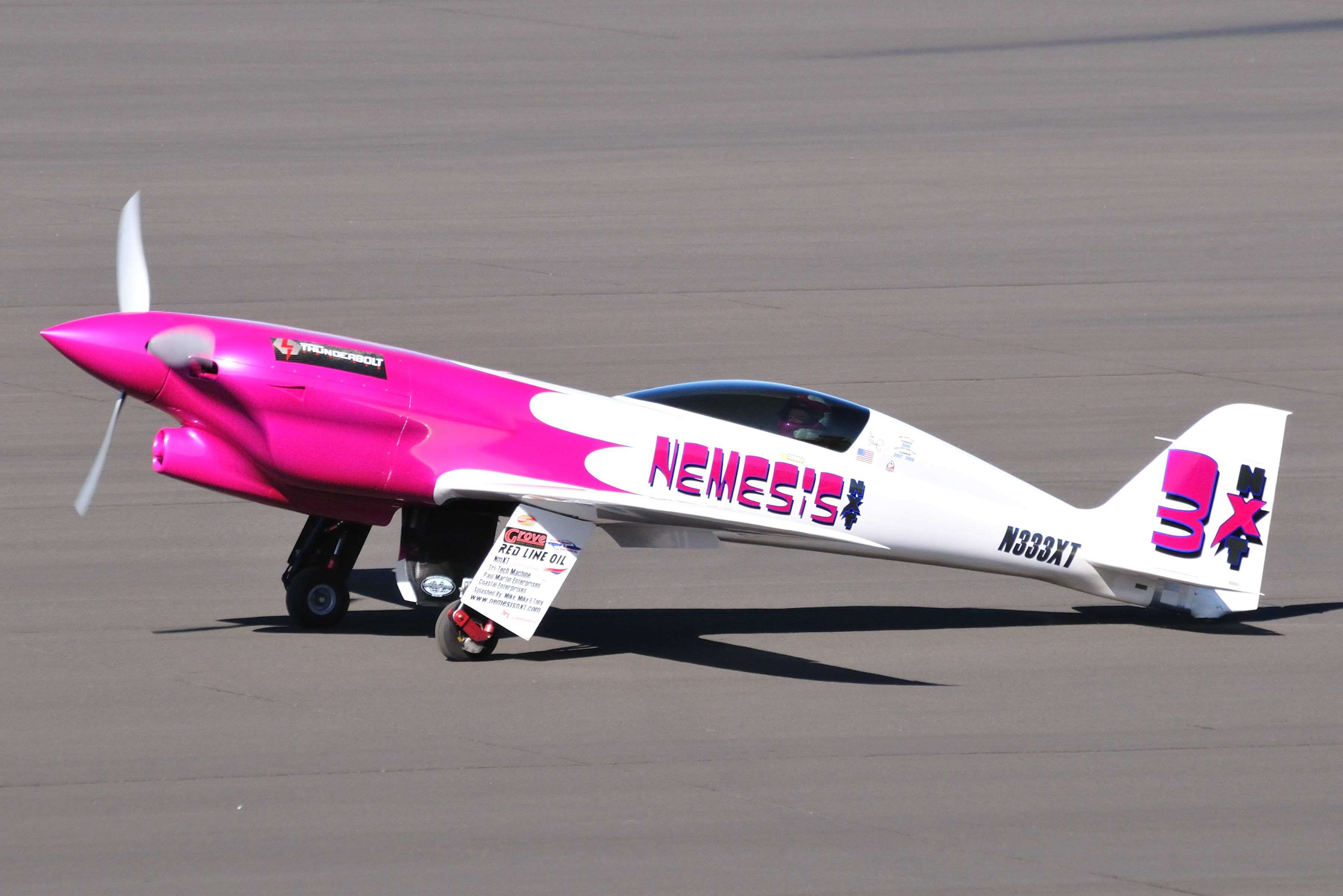
Jon Sharp's N333XT at Reno, 2009

== Specifications ==
Data from Nemesis NXT

General characteristics

- Crew: 1
- Capacity: 2
- Length: 23 ft (7.0 m)
- Wingspan: 24 ft (7.3 m)
- Wing area: 70 sq ft (6.5 m^{2})
- Airfoil: Modified NASA NLF (Natural Laminar Flow)
- Empty weight: 1,600 lb (726 kg)
- Max takeoff weight: 2,600 lb (1,179 kg)
- Fuel capacity: 90 US gal (340 L; 75 imp gal)
- Powerplant: 1 × Lycoming TIO-540-NXT piston engine, 350 hp (260 kW)

Performance

- Cruise speed: 325 mph (523 km/h, 282 kn) IAS
- Stall speed: 90 mph (140 km/h, 78 kn) IAS
- Rate of climb: 3,000 ft/min (15 m/s)
- Fuel consumption: 0.369 lb/mi (0.104 kg/km)
- Fuel consumption: 20 US gal (76 L)/h in cruise, 35 US gal (130 L)/h at full power
- Take Off: 2,500 ft (760 m) @ sea level
- Landing: 3,500 ft (1,100 m) @ sea level
