= Chester Jeep =

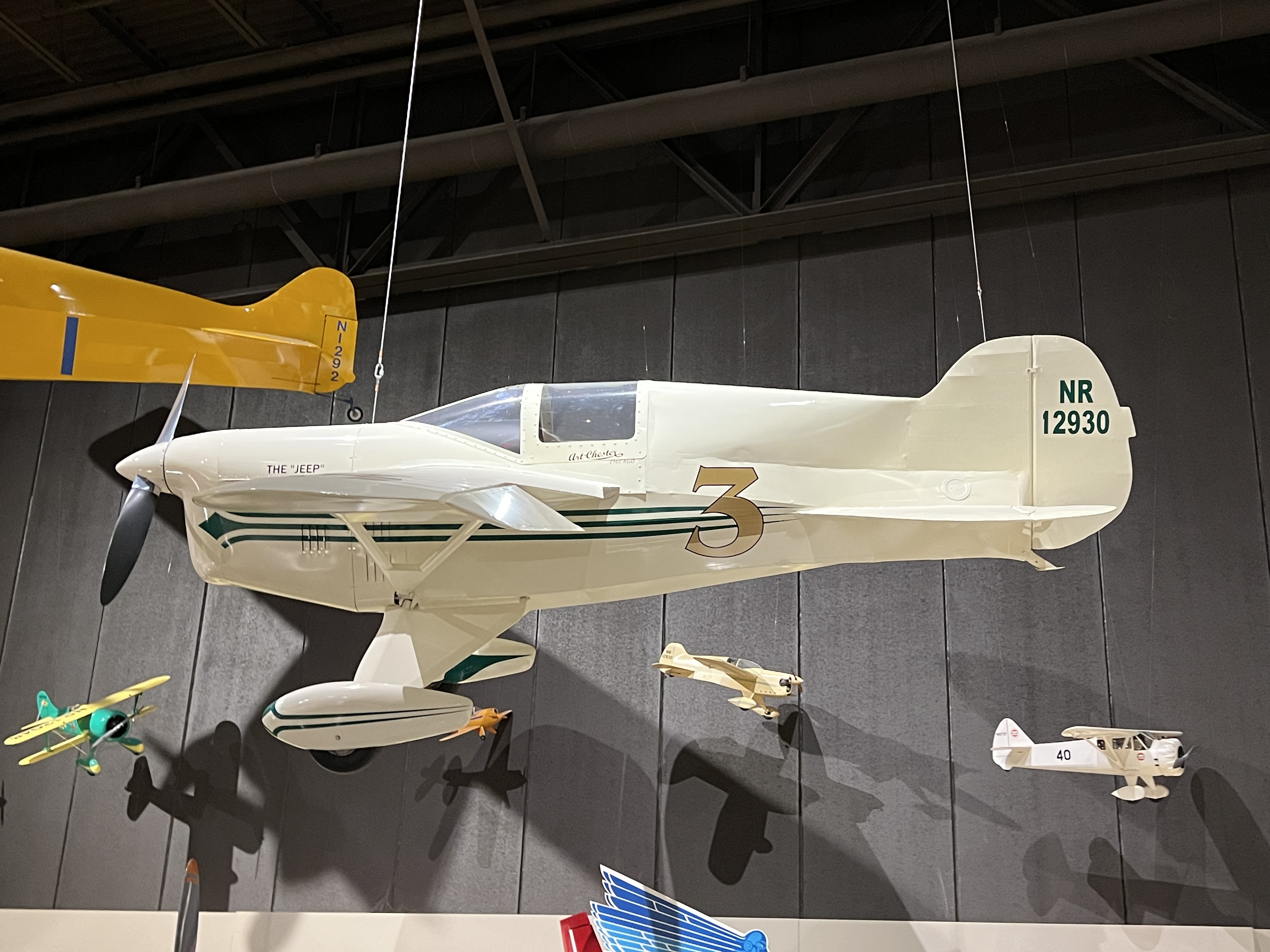
- The Chester Jeep on display

General information
- Type: Air racer
- National origin: United States of America
- Designer: Art Chester
- Number built: 1

History
- Introduction date: 1932

The Chester Jeep aka the Chester Special #1 is an air racer built by Art Chester for the 1932 National Air Races. The aircraft once held the world's speed record for aircraft at 237 mph (381 km/h).

== Design and development ==
The Chester Jeep was named after "Eugene the Jeep" from the Popeye comics of the time. Chester created a compact airframe in order to maximize speed from a small engine. Art Chester later designed the nose and cowling of the P-51 fighter for North American Aviation.

The Jeep was a mid-wing taildragger racer using a Menasco engine. The wings were supported with small struts. The Jeep was modified with a new prop, spinner and less sharp angles for the 1934 National Air Races. The aircraft's wings were removed and reinstalled for trailering to air events. In 1947 the aircraft was retrofitted ("butchered" by some) with an 85 hp (63 kW) engine to meet the power requirement for the Goodyear races.

== Operational history ==
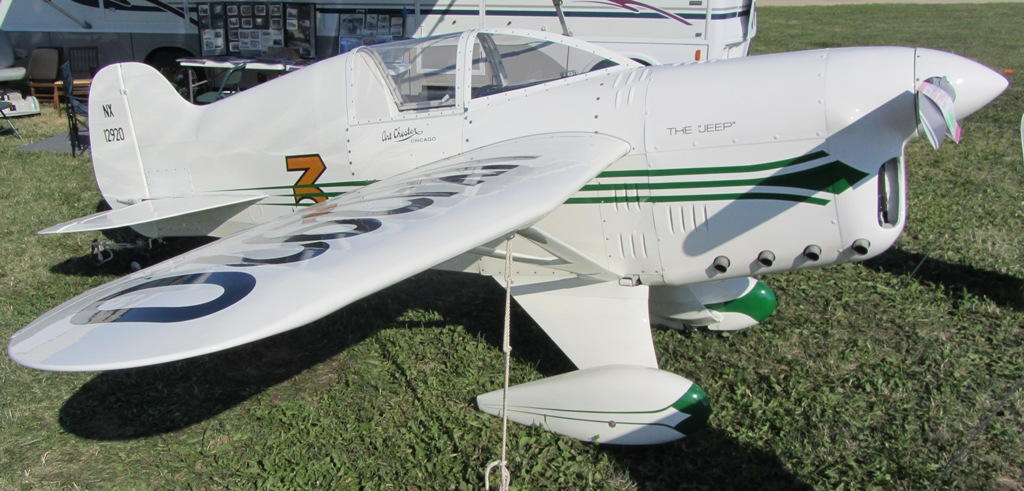
A Replica of the Chester Jeep

The green and cream colored aircraft was intended to compete in the 1932 National Air Races, but was finished too late. It saw its first race in 1933.

- 1933 National Air Races - 375 Cubic inch class - placed first once, and fourth four other times with a top speed of 154.365 mph (248 km/h)
- 1933 Chicago - 375 Cubic inch class placed first four times, 1000 Cubic inch class placed second, 550 Cubic inch class placed third twice with a top speed of 190.95 mph (307 km/h)
- 1934 Shell speed dash - top speed of 229.72 mph (370 km/h).
- 1934 National Air Races - Cleveland, Ohio 375 Cubic inch class - placed second four times, in the 550 Cubic inch class placed Third twice, and fourth and fifth once.
- 1935 National Air Races - 375 Cubic inch class - placed first twice, in the 550 Cubic inch class placed third once and fourth once.
- 1935 Miami Air Races - Placed first once, and second once.
- 1936 National Air Races - First time racing under the name "Jeep". 375 Cubic inch class - placed second three times. Placed third in one 550 Cubic inch race.
- 1938 Golden Gate International Exhibition race - placed last against aircraft with over 1000 hp in the field. Chester sells the Jeep to start on a new design, the "Goon".
- 1939 National Air Races - New owner Tom Stauch did not file correct paperwork to fly.
- 1947 Goodyear Races re-engined for Formula One Air Racing. Piloted by Bill Falck.
- 1948 Cleveland Air Races

In 1977 the aircraft was donated to the EAA Airventure Museum in Oshkosh, Wisconsin where it is now restored.

== Specifications (Chester Jeep) ==
Data from EAA

General characteristics

- Capacity: 1
- Length: 15 ft (4.6 m)
- Wingspan: 16 ft 8 in (5.08 m)
- Height: 4 ft 10 in (1.47 m)
- Wing area: 48 sq ft (4.5 m^{2})
- Empty weight: 765 lb (347 kg)
- Gross weight: 1,150 lb (522 kg)
- Fuel capacity: 30 US gallons (114 litres)
- Powerplant: 1 × Menasco C4-S air-cooled inverted in-line piston engine, 185 hp (138 kW)

Performance

- Maximum speed: 222 kn (255 mph, 410 km/h)
- Cruise speed: 190 kn (219 mph, 352 km/h)

== See also ==
Related development

- Chester Goon
- Chester Swee Pea
