= Seguin Wasabi Special =

Wasabi Special
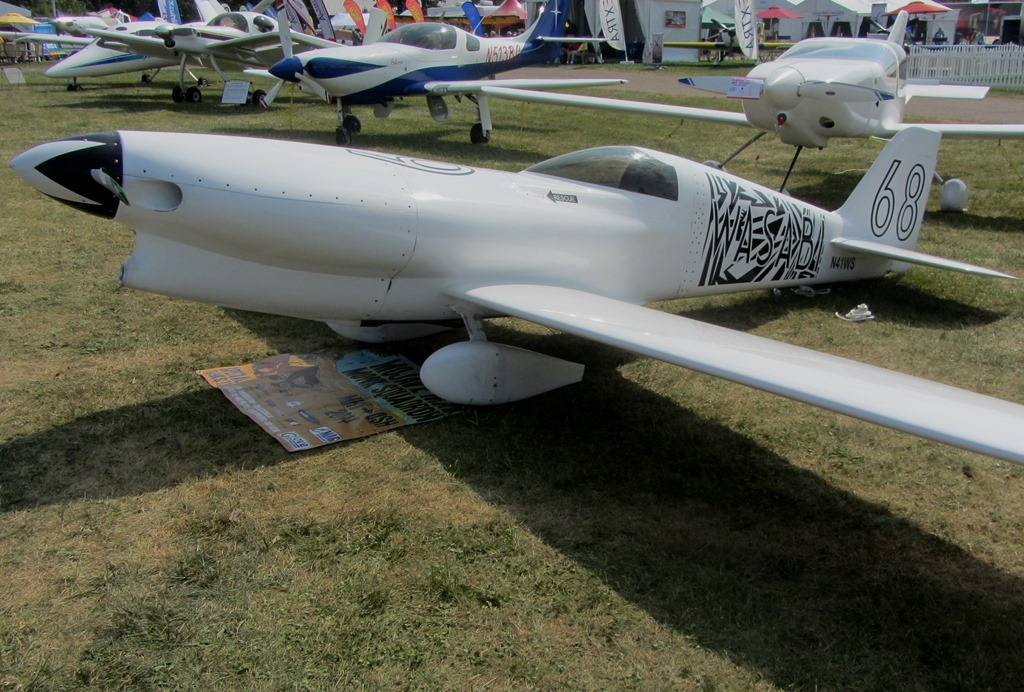
- Wasabi Special at EAA AirVenture

General information
- Type: Racing aircraft
- Designer: Elliot Seguin
- Number built: 1

The Wasabi Special is a Formula One racing aircraft.

== Development ==
The Wasabi Special is a single place, low-wing, conventional landing gear-equipped racing aircraft.

The airplane was designed and built at the Mojave Air and Spaceport by Elliot Seguin for racing and record setting.

== Operational history ==
Reno Air Races 2013-229 mph EAA Airventure Set C1-a record for MHV to OSH flying non-stop with 5 other experimental aircraft from Mojave. Reno Air Races 2014-235 mph

== Specifications (Wasabi Special) ==
Data from Wasabi Racing

General characteristics

- Crew: 1
- Powerplant: 1 × Continental O-200 horizontally opposed piston aircraft engine
- Propellers: 2-bladed

Performance
