= Williams W-17 Stinger =

American homebuilt aircraft

W-17 Stinger
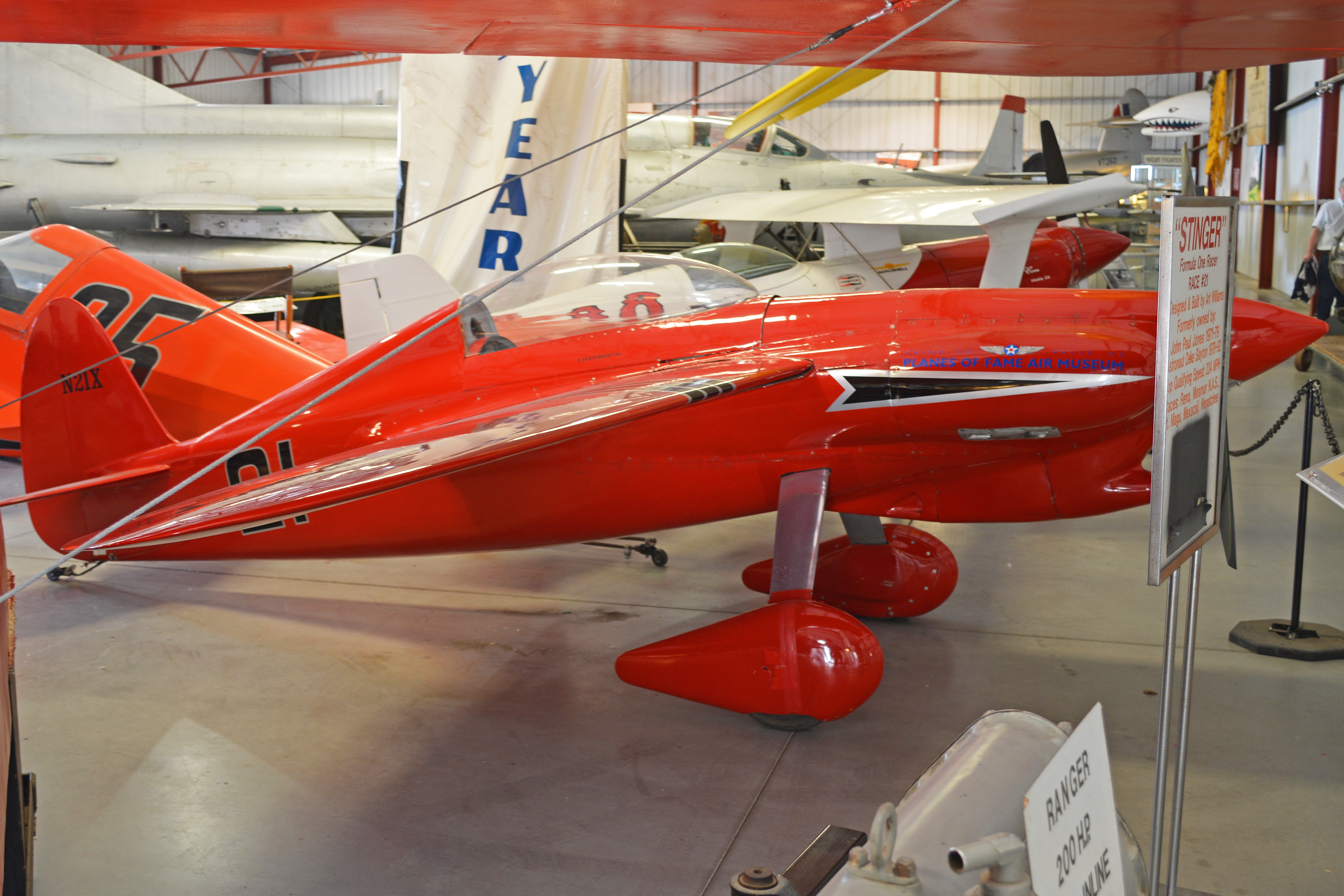
- The Williams W-17 Stinger on display at the Planes of Fame Museum, Chino, California, United States

General information
- Type: Formula One Air Racing aircraft
- National origin: United States
- Manufacturer: Williams Aircraft Design Co
- Designer: Art Williams
- Status: Production completed (1971)
- Number built: One

History
- Introduction date: 1971

The Williams W-17 Stinger is an American homebuilt racing aircraft that was designed for Formula One Air Racing by Art Williams and produced by his company, Williams Aircraft Design of Northridge, California, introduced in 1971. The aircraft was at one time available in the form of plans for amateur construction, but only one was ever constructed.

== Design and development ==
The W-17 Stinger features a cantilever mid-wing, a single-seat enclosed cockpit under a bubble canopy, fixed conventional landing gear and a single engine in tractor configuration.

The aircraft fuselage is made from sheet aluminum in a monocoque structure. The wings are all-wood, with laminated spruce spars. Its 19.0 ft (5.8 m) span wing employs a NACA 64008 airfoil at the wing root, transitioning to a NACA 64010 at the wing tip. As the Formula One rules require, the engine is a 100 hp (75 kW) Continental O-200A powerplant.

The W-17 has an empty weight of 585 lb (265 kg) and a gross weight of 835 lb (379 kg), giving a useful load of 250 lb (110 kg). With full fuel of 8 U.S. gallons (30 L; 6.7 imp gal) the payload is 202 lb (92 kg).

== Operational history ==
Only one example of the W-17 Stinger was registered in the United States with the Federal Aviation Administration in 1971.

The sole example was raced at the Reno Air Races by pilot John P. Jones in 1973 and captured second place.

== Aircraft on display ==
- Planes of Fame Air Museum - sole example built

== Specifications (W-17 Stinger) ==
Data from Plane and Pilot

General characteristics

- Crew: one
- Length: 15 ft 10 in (4.83 m)
- Wingspan: 19 ft 0 in (5.79 m)
- Airfoil: Root: NACA 64008, wing tip: NACA 64010
- Empty weight: 585 lb (265 kg)
- Gross weight: 835 lb (379 kg)
- Fuel capacity: 8 U.S. gallons (30 L; 6.7 imp gal)
- Powerplant: 1 × Continental O-200A four cylinder, air-cooled, four stroke aircraft engine, 100 hp (75 kW)
- Propellers: 2-bladed metal

Performance

- Maximum speed: 260 mph (420 km/h, 230 kn)
- Stall speed: 65 mph (105 km/h, 56 kn)
