= Loose Special =

General information
- Type: Racing aircraft
- National origin: America
- Designer: Chet Loose
- Number built: 1

History
- Introduction date: 1933

The Loose Special, also called the Townsend A-1 Special, the Loose-Siem Special and the Townsend Special is a small air racer developed for the Thompson Trophy races.

== Design ==
The Loose Special is a small single seat racer with conventional landing gear and a cable-braced mid-wing. The engine was replaced with an 85 hp (63 kW) Continental to compete in the Formula One air races.

== Operational history ==
The Loose Special participated in 1933, 1935 and 1938 air races. In the 1948 Goodyear Formula One Air Races pilot Earl Ortman placed fourth at a speed of 127.339 mph (205 km/h).

== Specifications (Loose Siem Special) ==
Data from Skyways, Flying

General characteristics

- Crew: 1
- Length: 13 ft (4.0 m)
- Wingspan: 19 ft (5.8 m)
- Empty weight: 530 lb (240 kg)
- Gross weight: 800 lb (363 kg)
- Propellers: 2-bladed McCaulley

Performance

- Maximum speed: 134 kn (154 mph, 248 km/h)
- Stall speed: 70 kn (80 mph, 130 km/h)
- Endurance: 3 hr
- Rate of climb: 2,000 ft/min (10 m/s)
- Wing loading: 11 lb/sq ft (54 kg/m^{2})
