= Bellanca 28-70 =

Long range air racer

28-70 Irish Swoop
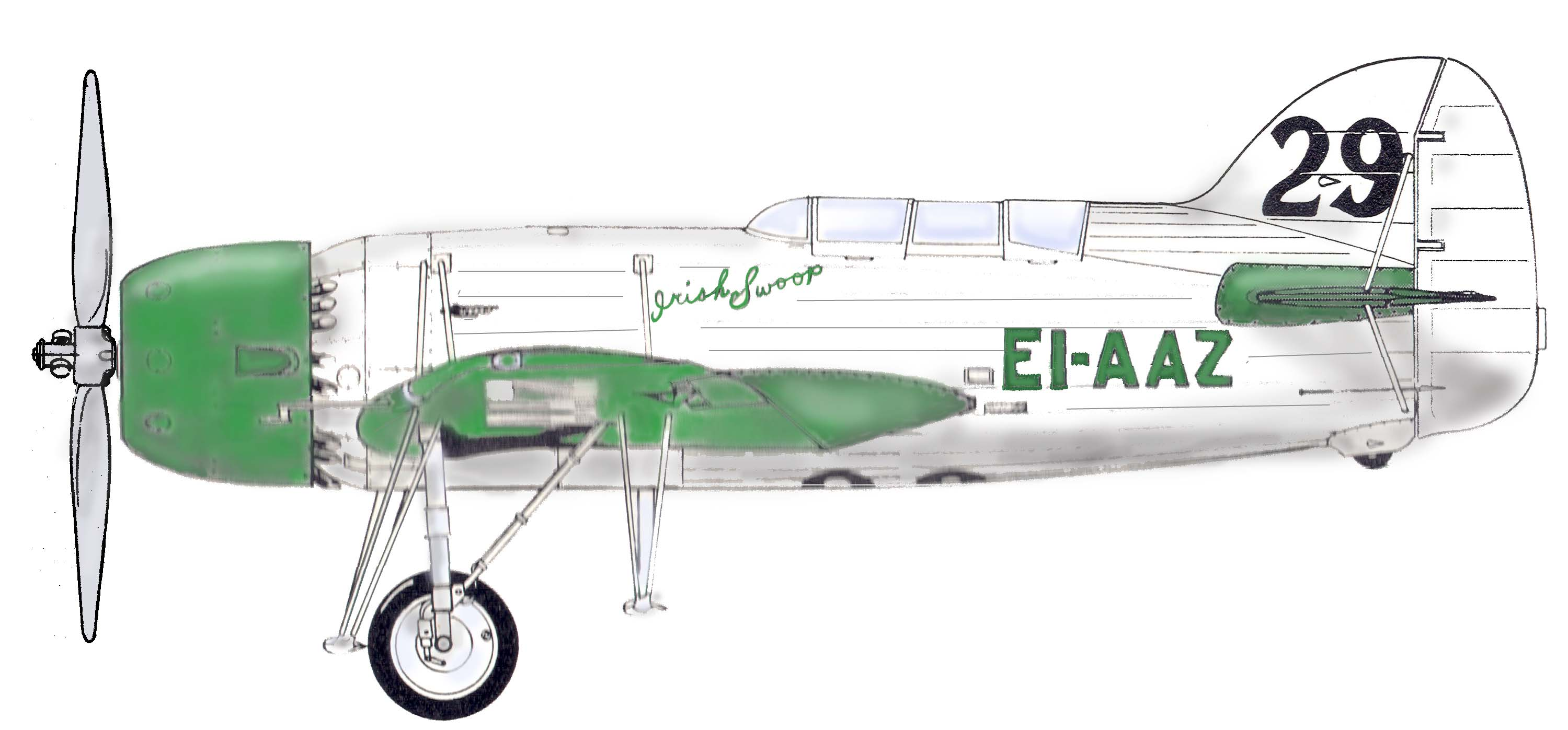
- Bellanca 28-70 as "Irish Swoop"

General information
- Type: Air racing aircraft
- Manufacturer: Bellanca
- Designer: Albert W. Mooney
- Primary user: Irish Hospitals' Trust
- Number built: 1

History
- First flight: 1 September 1934
- Variant: Bellanca 28-90 Flash

The Bellanca 28-70 was a long-range air racer designed for James Fitzmaurice, Irish pioneer aviator, who christened it Irish Swoop. Although it was built in time for the 1934 MacRobertson Race from England to Australia, it was never destined to be a competitive long-distance racer but it was ultimately reborn as a high-speed bomber.

== Design and development ==
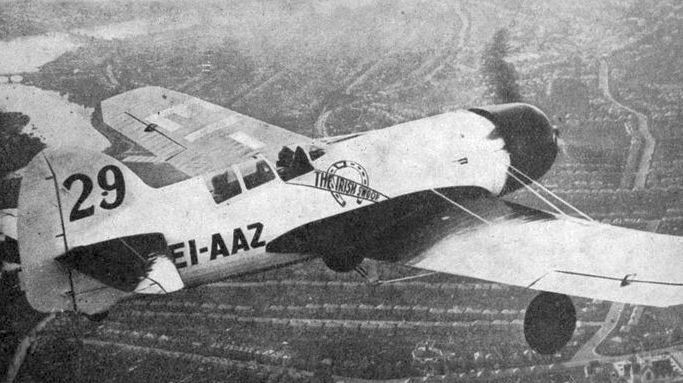
Bellanca 28-70 photo from L'Aerophile November 1934

In preparation for the upcoming 1934 MacRobertson Race from England to Australia, Col. James "Fitz" Fitzmaurice, former commanding officer of the Irish Free State Air Force travelled to the United States in spring 1934 to commission a long-distance air racing aircraft. After approaching the Lockheed Aircraft and Northrop Aircraft companies, he sought out Giuseppe Mario Bellanca. Although he did not have a product to sell, Bellanca made a proposal to Fitzmaurice to build a "one-off" specialty aircraft for $30,000.00.

In May 1934, Fitzmaurice signed an agreement for a new aircraft called the Bellanca 28-70. Bellanca turned to a conventional wooden frame with fabric covering but the purposeful profile did not look like any of the previous company designs. Powered by a Pratt & Whitney 700 hp double-row "Wasp Jr.", the long streamlined fuselage merged a tandem cockpit area topped by an extended canopy into a low-wing monoplane configuration with retractable main landing gear. An unusual set of top and bottom wing braces were utilized. Designed for a fuel capacity of 400 gallons, in order to have long "legs," a total of 600 gallons of fuel were aboard, raising the gross weight to 8,350 lbs.

== Operational history ==
After receiving the aircraft, Fitzmaurice and his co-pilot, Eric "Jock" Bonar conducted a rapid series of preflight tests in New York before carrying out the first flight on 1 September 1934. The initial flight showed problems in aileron controls that necessitated a modification. Following a successful second test flight, the aircraft painted as "race 29" was crated and shipped by sea on the liner SS Bremen with a final destination at Bremerhaven, after the aircraft was unable to be offloaded at its first stop in Southampton, when the small ship that was to transport the Bellanca broke its towline.

Christened the Irish Swoop, Fitzmaurice and Bonar took off in the racer on 9 October, arriving in Great Britain barely in time for the start of the MacRobertson Race. The ferry flight was problematic with a cracked cowling forcing a landing at Amsterdam.

The MacRobertson race rules committee considered the Fitzmaurice and Bonar entry not "race-ready". A more serious problem involved the Bellanca exceeding its design specifications wherein it had been certified for a 400-gallon fuel capacity and now was carrying much more fuel and weight without being recertified. Assigned a penalty that limited its fuel to 120 gallons, Fitzmaurice withdrew the Irish Swoop hours before the race, unwilling to sacrifice his fuel load.

After being recertified for its new configuration, Fitzmaurice and Bonar undertook a long-distance record flight on 29 October 1934 intending to set a new London-Baghdad mark (4,100 km / 2546 mi). Over Belgium, however, problems with a fairing and the cowling caused an end to the attempt. The Bellanca was shipped back to the US to finish its tests, but was badly damaged in a landing accident on 15 April 1935 when a gust of wind flipped the aircraft on its back during a proving flight undertaken by Bonar and Bellanca mechanic Eddie Griscome. In 1936, the aircraft was rebuilt with a 900 hp P&W Twin Wasp and redesignated the 28-90.

Purchased by British long-distance air racer Jim Mollison for $28,000, he renamed the aircraft Dorothy and used the Bellanca for a new transatlantic speed record, but in 1937 sold the aircraft to the Republican government in Spain.

The Bellanca 28-90 Flash was developed into a bomber in the 1930s for export to Spain to take part in the Spanish Civil War. Although none reached Spain, the order was diverted to China where the aircraft briefly saw service. Later, an additional batch destined for Spain ended up in Mexico. A total of 43 aircraft were produced.

== Operators ==
Ireland

- Irish Hospitals' Trust

Spain

- Spanish Republican Air Force

== Specifications ==
General characteristics

- Crew: two, pilot and co-pilot
- Length: 26 ft 6 in (8.08 m)
- Wingspan: 46 ft 2 in (14.08 m)
- Wing area: 279 sq ft (25.9 m^{2})
- Gross weight: 8,350 lb (3,787 kg)
- Powerplant: 1 × Pratt & Whitney R-1535 , 700 hp (521 kW)

Performance

- Maximum speed: 275 mph (442 km/h, 239 kn)
- Range: 2,500 mi (4,023 km, 2,200 nmi)
- Service ceiling: 30,500 ft (9,300 m)
- Rate of climb: 2,800 ft/min (14.2 m/s)

== See also ==
- Giuseppe Mario Bellanca

=== Aircraft of comparable role, configuration and era ===
- Granville Gee Bee R-6 Q.E.D.
- Lockheed Model 8 Sirius
- Northrop Gamma

=== Related lists ===
- List of racing aircraft
