= Bellanca 28-90 =

28-90 Flash
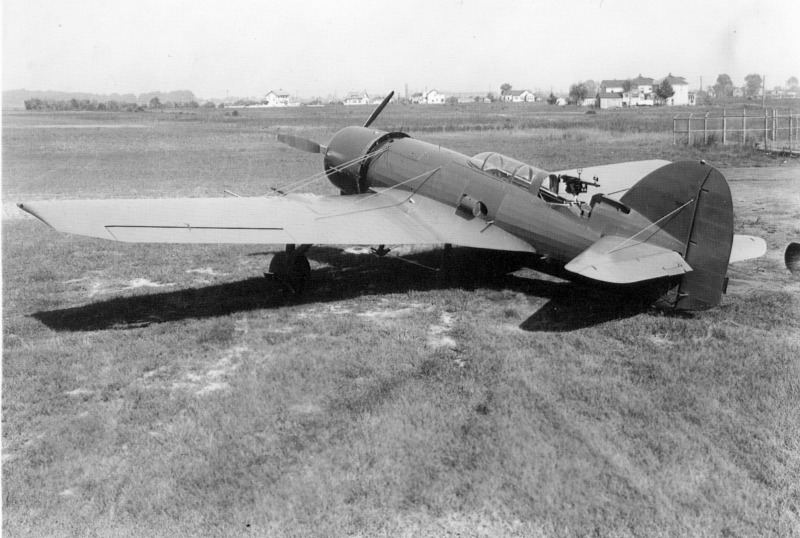
- Bellanca 28-90.

General information
- Type: Military utility aircraft
- Manufacturer: Bellanca
- Designer: Albert W. Mooney
- Primary users: Chinese Nationalist Air Force, Mexican Air Force Spanish Republican Air Force
- Number built: 43

History
- First flight: 1937
- Developed from: Bellanca 28-70

The Bellanca 28-90 Flash was an American military aircraft derived from an earlier air racer developed in the 1930s for export to Spain to take part in the Spanish Civil War. Although it never reached Spain, the order was diverted to China where the aircraft briefly saw service. Later, a new batch destined for Spain ended up in Mexico.

== Design and development ==
The Bellanca 28-70 air racer built by Giuseppe Mario Bellanca for the 1934 MacRobertson Race was shipped to Great Britain but was unable to participate in the race due to a lack of time to adequately prepare the aircraft. It went back to the US to finish its tests, but was badly damaged in a landing accident. In 1936 the aircraft was rebuilt with a 900 hp P&W "Twin Wasp" and redesignated the 28–90. After being purchased by British long-distance air racer James Mollison, he renamed the aircraft Dorothy after actress friend Dorothy Ward. Mollison used the Bellanca 28-90 for a new transatlantic speed record on 29–30 October 1936 and later in the year made an attempt to set a long-distance London-Cape Town record that was aborted. In 1937 Mollison flew to Madrid and sold the aircraft to the Republican government in Spain.

== Operational history ==
The Spanish Republican government, in desperate need of modern military aircraft, placed an order for 20 aircraft in 1936 through an "arms length" deal with Air France. In order to circumvent US government export restrictions in the Neutrality Acts aimed at stopping exports to combatants in Europe, the Bellanca 28-90s were marked with spurious Air France livery and declared by Bellanca to be mailplanes. The truth was discovered, however, and export permission was denied. Nevertheless, the Chinese government managed to secure permission to buy the aircraft and they were shipped there instead. Fitted with bomb racks and machine guns mounted in the fuselage at Hangkow, this first batch of machines saw brief service, although seven of them were destroyed on the ground in Japanese raids without having seen combat. The remainder were destroyed in testing.

Undaunted, the Spanish government tried again, ordering 22 examples as "trainers" with full payment in advance, with the aircraft this time being exported to a Greek civil reservist flying school. Once again, however, the truth was found out and export permission denied. They were eventually successfully purchased for export to Mexico, but with their true destination again Spain. However, before the aircraft could be supplied, the Spanish Civil War was over. After languishing for over a year in a warehouse in Veracruz, they were indeed purchased by the Mexican Air Force, with which they served from 1939 to 1940 until grounded due to safety concerns.

In 1946, the surviving 19 airframes were acquired by the Charles E. Babb Company and shipped to Glendale, California. A final sale of the Bellancas still in packing crates was made to the US Navy where the aircraft were distributed to US Navy Technical Centers as training aids.

== Operators ==
China

- Chinese Nationalist Air Force

Mexico

- Mexican Air Force

Spain

- Spanish Republican Air Force

== Specifications ==
Data from Flying Equipment: Bellanca Mailplane

General characteristics

- Crew: Two
- Capacity: 1,060 lb (480 kg) payload
- Length: 25 ft 11 in (7.90 m)
- Wingspan: 46 ft 1 3/4 in (14.065 m)
- Height: 8 ft 8 in (2.64 m)
- Wing area: 279 sq ft (25.9 m^{2})
- Empty weight: 4,330 lb (1,964 kg)
- Gross weight: 6,755 lb (3,064 kg)
- Powerplant: 1 × Pratt & Whitney Twin Wasp , 900 hp (670 kW) at 6,200 ft (1,900 m)

Performance

- Maximum speed: 280 mph (450 km/h, 240 kn) at 6,200 ft (1,900 m)
- Cruise speed: 250 mph (400 km/h, 220 kn) (75% power)
- Range: 800 mi (1,300 km, 700 nmi)
- Service ceiling: 30,500 ft (9,300 m)
- Rate of climb: 3,760 ft/min (19.1 m/s)
