= Condor Shoestring =

Shoestring
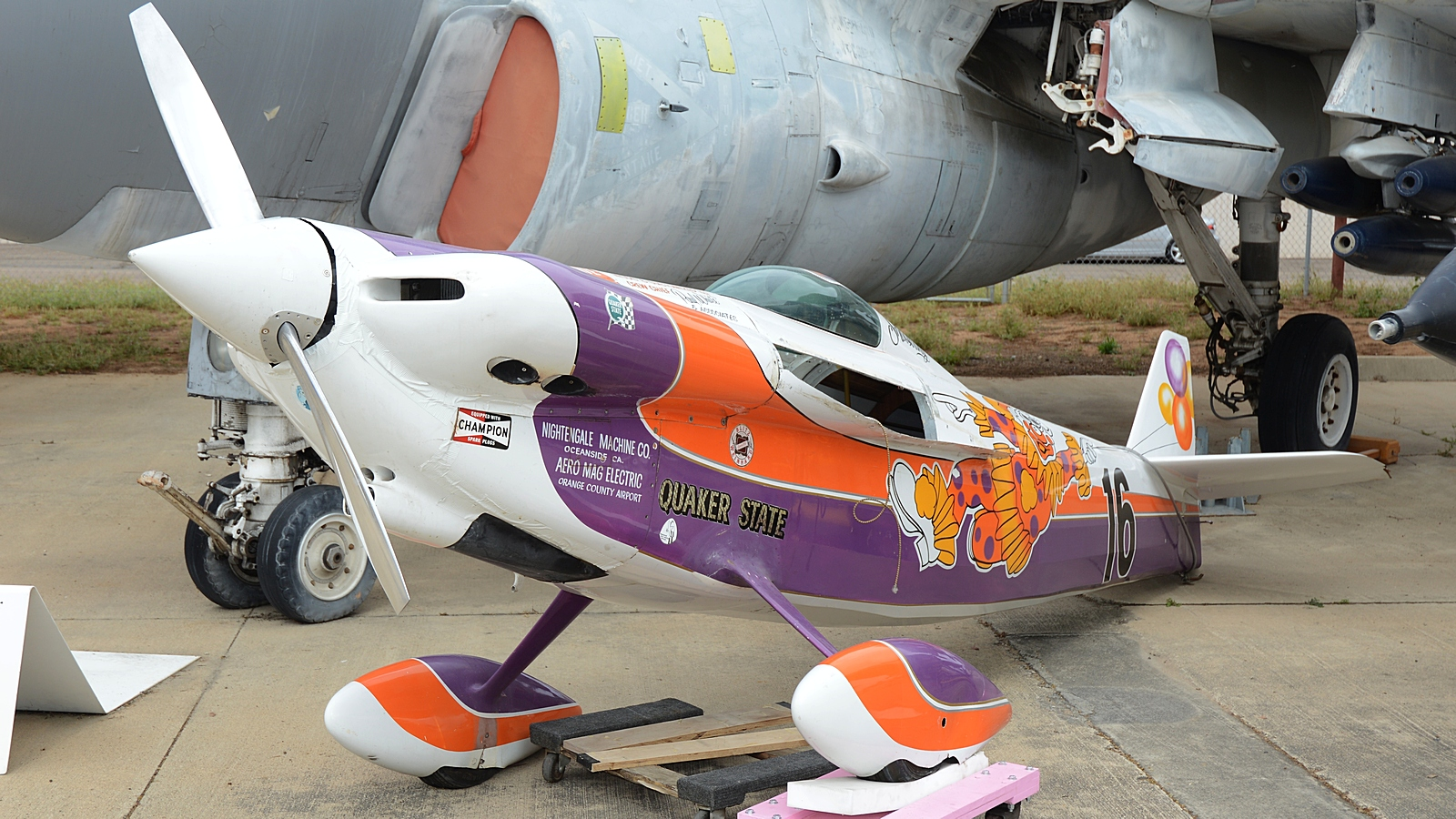
- Shoestring N16V awaiting restoration

General information
- Type: Formula One Air Racing aircraft
- Manufacturer: Mercury Air, Condor Aero for homebuilding
- Designer: Rodney Kreimendahl

History
- First flight: 1949

The Condor K-10 Shoestring (originally known as the Ast Special and the Mercury Air Shoestring) was a Formula One Air Racing aircraft built by Carl and Vincent Ast to compete in the Cleveland National Air Races in 1949. It was a highly streamlined mid-wing cantilever monoplane with fixed tailwheel undercarriage. The mainwheels were covered with spats. The shoestring differed in approach to the 66 sq ft wing limitation, choosing a longer high aspect ratio tapered wing compared to the stubby wings of others. The original aircraft (registered N16V) was extensively rebuilt in 1965 and 1974, and by that time had won fourteen first places, three second places and four third places.

== Design and development ==
Although the original design drawings appear to have been lost or destroyed, one of the aircraft's owners, John Anderson, had Piper engineer Landis Ketner make a completely new set from examination of the aircraft itself. These plans were used by Jim Strode to build a second aircraft, incorporating changes of his own including a completely new cowling design. This machine first flew on 15 July 1970 as Yellow Jacket (registration N88JS). Under the name Condor Aero, Ketner soon made the plans available to homebuilders.

== Variants ==
K-10 Shoestring
1949 Original
Condor Aero
"Yellow Jacket"

== Specifications (typical) ==
Data from Air Trails Summer 1971

General characteristics

- Crew: One pilot
- Length: 17 ft 8 in (5.38 m)
- Wingspan: 19 ft 0 in (5.79 m)
- Height: 4 ft 8 in (1.42 m)
- Empty weight: 565 lb (256 kg)
- Gross weight: 800 lb (362 kg)
- Powerplant: 1 × Continental C85 , 85 hp (64 kW)

Performance

- Maximum speed: 240 mph (386 km/h, 210 kn)
- Rate of climb: 3,000 ft/min (15.2 m/s)
