= Chester Goon =

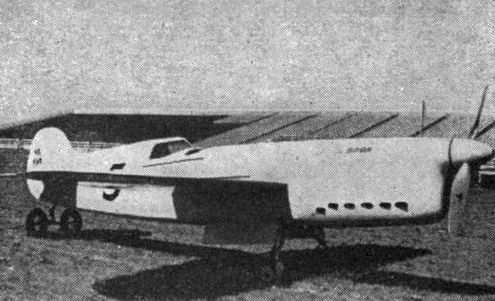

General information
- Type: Air racer
- National origin: United States of America
- Designer: Art Chester

History
- Introduction date: 1938

The Chester Goon a.k.a. The Chester Special #2 was a single-engine taildragger-configuration monoplane racer built for the 1938 National Air Races.

== Design and development ==
Art Chester followed on his successful air racer the "Jeep"" with the Goon. "Goon", like "Jeep" was named after characters in Popeye cartoons and comic strips.

The Goon was built with a conventional welded steel tube frame and fabric covering. The wings used spruce spars and plywood covering. The mid-wing taildragger aircraft featured short-legged retractable landing gear. The engine was prepared to turn clockwise (as normal for some British inlines of the era) in anticipation of mounting a custom French propeller, but the propeller was also customized for American engines, and the engine needed to be modified again to rotate normally.

During the 1956 rebuild, a 190 hp Lycoming O-435-1 engine was installed in place of the Menasco, including a cut down Beech-Roby propeller and wheel brakes.

== Operational history ==
- 1938 Placed second in the Greve Trophy Races of the National Air Races with a speed of 250.42 mph (403 km/h).
- 1938 Thompson Trophy - Has to drop out after failure of prop.
- 1939 National Air Races - First place at 263.39 mph (424 km/h), winning the Greve Trophy and $9000.
- 1939 Thompson Trophy - Dropped out with engine trouble.

In 1939 20th Century Fox featured the Goon in the movie series Tailspin Tommy. By 1956, the Goon was purchased in unflyable condition. On December 23, 1957, the rebuilt Goon was test flown by Harvey Mace at Sacramento, California.

The Goon was purchased in 1991 by the Crawford Auto-Aviation Museum and was awaiting restoration in Macedonia, Ohio.

== Specifications (Chester Goon) ==
Data from EAA

General characteristics

- Crew: One
- Length: 20 ft 6 in (6.25 m)
- Wingspan: 18 ft 6 in (5.64 m)
- Powerplant: 1 × Menasco C-6-S Buccaneer 6-cyl. air-cooled inverted in-line piston engine, 450 hp (340 kW)
- Propellers: 2-bladed French Ratier Controllable
- Maximum speed: 228.88 kn (263.39 mph, 423.89 km/h)

== See also ==
Related development

- Chester Jeep
