= VSR SR-1 Snoshoo =

American homebuilt racing aircraft

SR-1 Snoshoo

General information
- Type: Homebuilt aircraft
- National origin: United States
- Manufacturer: VanMeter Smith Racing
- Designer: Alan VanMeter and A.J. Smith
- Status: In production (2014)
- Number built: At least one

History
- Manufactured: 1993-present
- Introduction date: 1993
- First flight: 1997

The VSR SR-1 Snoshoo (English: Snowshoe) is an American homebuilt Formula One racing aircraft that was designed by Alan VanMeter and A.J. Smith and produced by VanMeter Smith Racing (VSR) of Wichita, Kansas. It was designed in 1993 and first flown in 1997. The aircraft is supplied in the form of plans for amateur construction, with some key parts available to speed construction.

== Design and development ==
The SR-1 Snoshoo features a cantilever mid-wing, a single-seat enclosed cockpit under a bubble canopy, fixed conventional landing gear with wheel pants and a single engine in tractor configuration.

The aircraft fuselage is made from welded 4130 steel tubing covered in carbon-fiber-reinforced polymer fairings ahead of the wing and doped aircraft fabric aft. Its 19.91 ft (6.1 m) span wing is made from Sitka spruce wood, has no flaps and has a wing area of 66.00 sq ft (6.132 m^{2}). The cockpit width is 22 in (56 cm). The acceptable power range is 95 to 100 hp (71 to 75 kW) and the standard engine used is the 100 hp (75 kW) Continental O-200A powerplant, as required by the Formula One rules. The aircraft is stressed to +/-8 g

The SR-1 Snoshoo has a typical empty weight of 530 lb (240 kg) and a gross weight of 760 lb (340 kg), giving a useful load of 230 lb (100 kg). With full fuel of 6 U.S. gallons (23 L; 5.0 imp gal) the payload for the pilot and baggage is 200 lb (91 kg).

The designers estimate the construction time from the supplied plans as 1500 hours.

== Operational history ==
By 1998 the company reported that 20 kits and sets of plans had been sold.

In March 2014 one example was registered in the United States with the Federal Aviation Administration.

== Specifications (SR-1 Snoshoo) ==
Data from AeroCrafter and VSR

General characteristics

- Crew: one
- Length: 17.91 ft (5.46 m)
- Wingspan: 19.91 ft (6.07 m)
- Height: 4 ft 1 in (1.24 m)
- Wing area: 66.00 sq ft (6.132 m^{2})
- Aspect ratio: 6.01:1
- Empty weight: 530 lb (240 kg)
- Gross weight: 760 lb (345 kg) (746 lbs (338 kg) for racing)
- Fuel capacity: 6 U.S. gallons (23 L; 5.0 imp gal)
- Powerplant: 1 × Continental O-200A four cylinder, air-cooled, four stroke aircraft engine, 100 hp (75 kW)
- Propellers: 2-bladed wooden, fixed pitch

Performance

- Maximum speed: 280 mph (450 km/h, 240 kn)
- Cruise speed: 220 mph (350 km/h, 190 kn)
- Stall speed: 65 mph (105 km/h, 56 kn)
- Never exceed speed: 350 mph (560 km/h, 300 kn)
- g limits: +/-8
- Rate of climb: 2,500 ft/min (13 m/s)
- Wing loading: 11.5 lb/sq ft (56 kg/m^{2})
