= Cassutt Special =

US single-seat racing aircraft, 1954

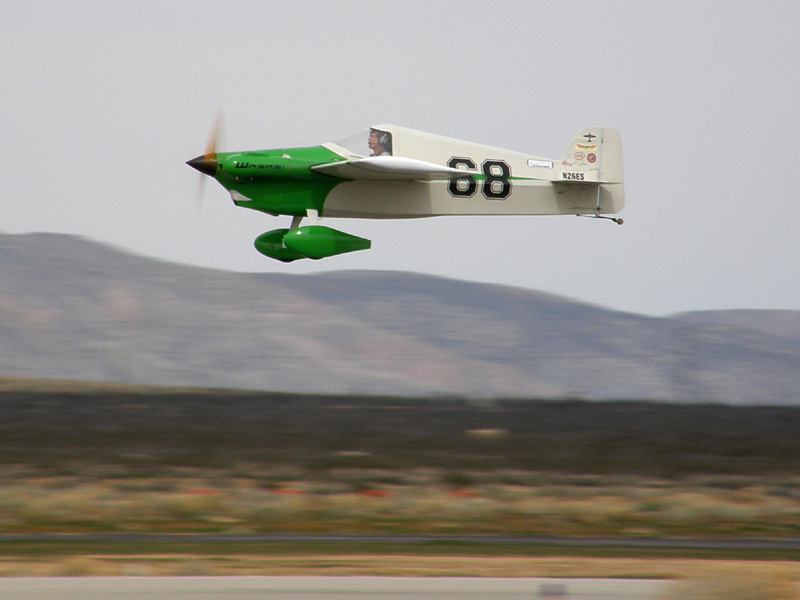

General information
- Type: Formula 1 racing aircraft
- Manufacturer: Homebuilt
- Designer: Tom Cassutt

History
- First flight: 1954

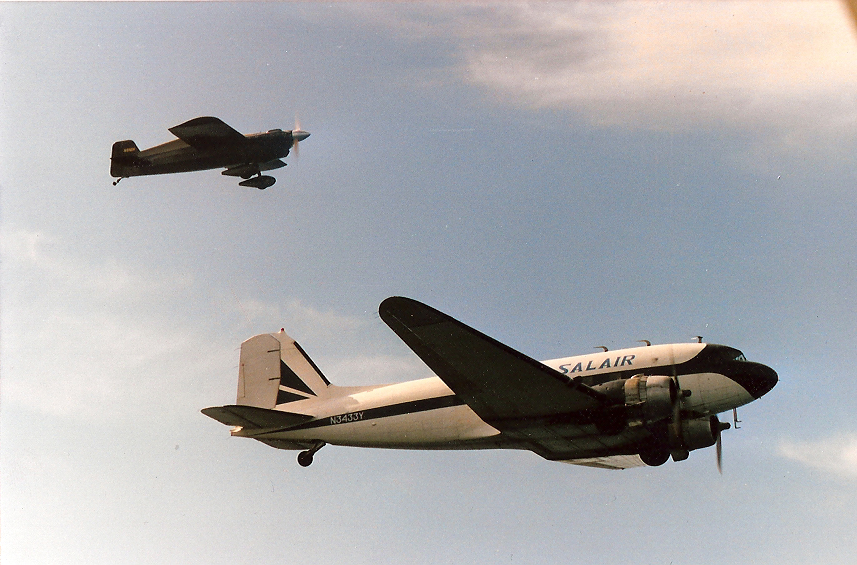
"Buster" flying formation with a Douglas DC-3

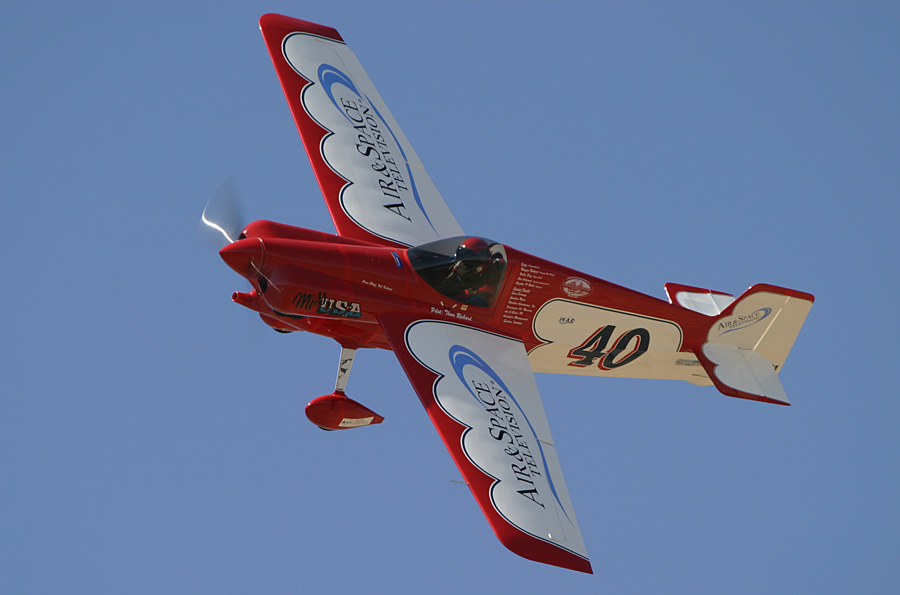
A Cassutt at the Reno Air Races

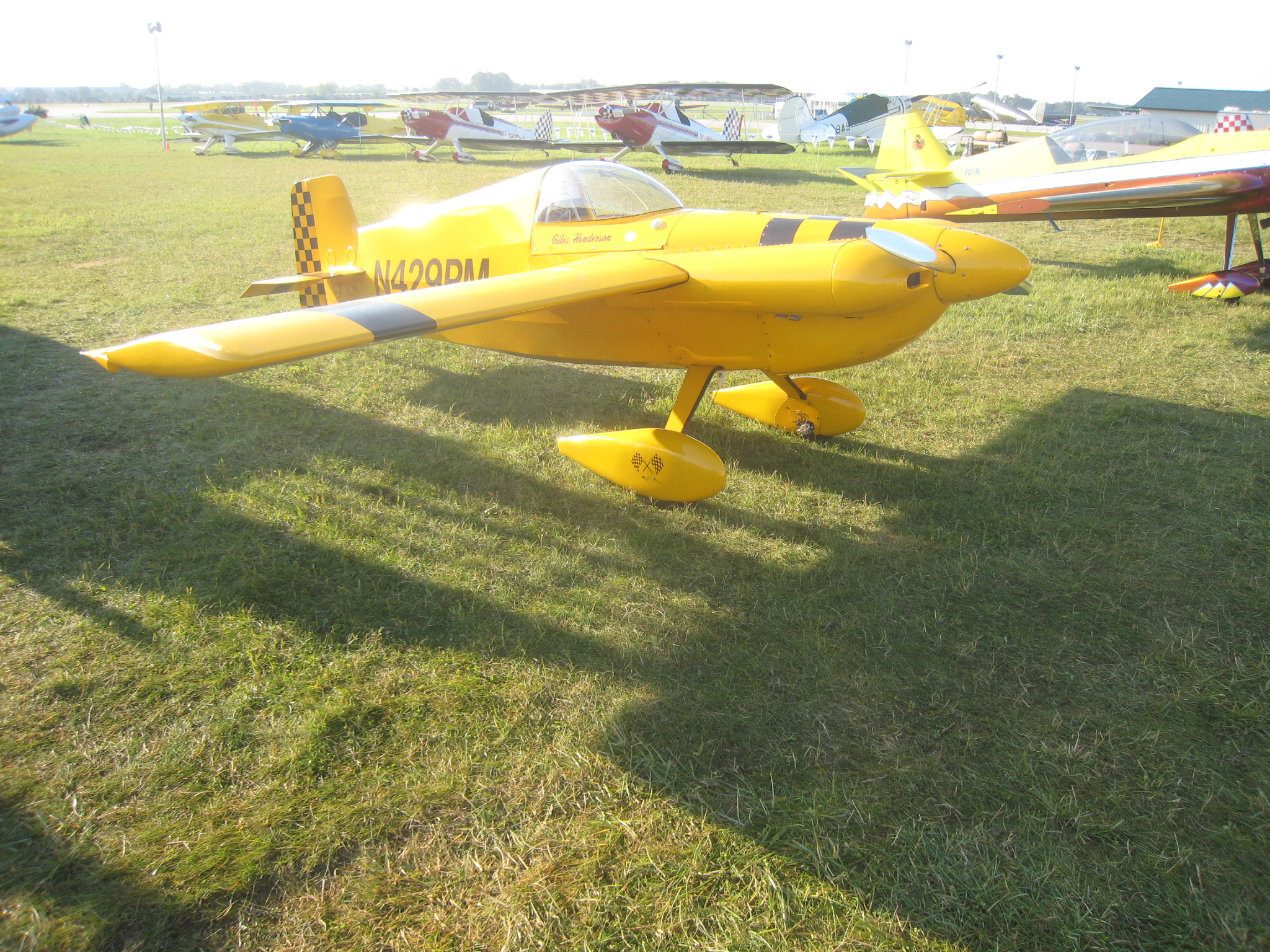
Cassutt IIIm

The Cassutt Special is a single-seat sport and racing aircraft designed in the United States in 1951 for Formula One air races. Designed by ex-TWA captain Tom Cassutt, it is a mid-wing cantilever monoplane with fixed tailwheel undercarriage. The fuselage and tail are of fabric-covered steel tube construction, and the wings are built from plywood over wooden ribs. An updated taper-wing design was first flown in 1971 on Jim Wilson's "Plum Crazy".

== Design and development ==
The aircraft is built with a 4130 tubular steel spaceframe fuselage and a plywood-skinned wing with solid spruce spar and built-up ribs. The design lends itself well to modification, there being several different wing options of wood or composite construction. Several different tails have been built, including T-tails.

The standard engine used for competition is the 100 hp (75 kW) Continental O-200, while other, lower-powered engines can be used for recreational flying, including the other small Continental A65 and Continental C90. Cassutt Aircraft discourages the use of auto conversions or larger Lycoming engines. Lycomings have been successful in several builds but the increased weight rarely gives the desired performance boost.

Plans and parts were last available from Creighton King in Utah, for amateur construction. King also offered plans for the Stockbarger tapered wood wing. King has since withdrawn the plans from the market.

== Operational history ==
- 1958 - Tom Cassutt flies his Cassutt to win the National Championship Midget Air Races at Ft. Wayne, Indiana.

== Variants ==
Cassutt I
Developed in 1951, First race at Dansville, New York in 1954.
Cassutt II
Casutt IIM
13.67 ft (4.2 m) wingspan
Cassutt IIIM
15 ft (4.6 m) wingspan
Cassutt IIIM Sport
17.00 ft (5.2 m) wingspan

== Specifications (Cassutt III racer) ==
General characteristics

- Crew: One pilot
- Length: 16 ft 0 in (4.88 m)
- Wingspan: 15 ft 0 in (4.57 m)
- Height: 4 ft 0 in (1.22 m)
- Wing area: 68 sq ft (6.3 m^{2})
- Empty weight: 500 lb (227 kg)
- Gross weight: 850 lb (386 kg)
- Powerplant: 1 × Continental O-200 , 100 hp (65 kW)

Performance

- Maximum speed: 248 mph (400 km/h, 216 kn)
- Range: 450 mi (725 km, 390 nmi)
- Rate of climb: 1,500 ft/min (7.6 m/s)

== See also ==
Aircraft of comparable role, configuration, and era

- Monnett Sonerai
- Owl Racer OR65-2
- Keleher Lark
