= Formula One Air Racing =

Light airplane racing class

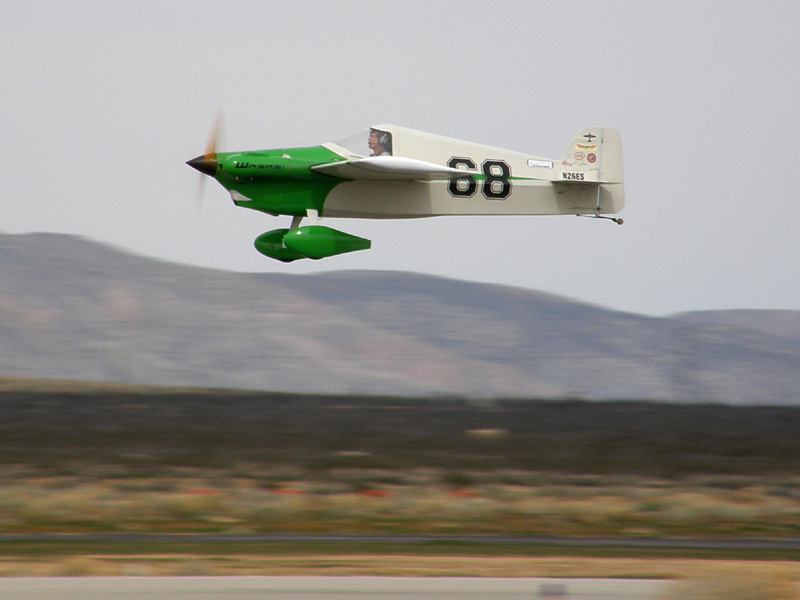
Cassutt formula one race plane Wasabi

Formula One Air Racing is an American motorsport that involves small aircraft using engines up to 200 cubic inches (3.3 litres) in displacement. Racers can reach speeds over 200 mph.

== History ==
Formula One air racing is sanctioned by the International Aeronautics Federation. Formula One was first proposed in 1936 as "midget racing". The 190 Cubic in specification was set in 1946, and the first competition was set in 1947. Some 1930s air racers, like the Chester Jeep and Loose Special were retrofitted with smaller engines to compete. With the introduction of the Continental O-200 engine, the maximum engine displacement was raised to 200 cubic inches in 1968. Aircraft must have a minimum wing area of 66 square feet (6.1 m^{2}), and an empty weight of 500 pounds or more. The aircraft must also have fixed landing gear, and a fixed pitch propeller. Racers compete in a 3.19-mile (5.13 km) Oval course.

Several aircraft were capable of meeting the specifications for Formula One at its creation. Specific designs were introduced shortly after that maximized speed for the configuration.

== Aircraft ==
- Arnold AR-6
- Baker Special
- Cassutt Special
- Chester Jeep
- Condor Shoestring
- Loose Special
- Mustang Aeronautics Midget Mustang
- Rollason Beta
- Seguin Wasabi Special
- Sharp Nemesis
- VSR SR-1 Snoshoo
- Williams W-17 Stinger
- Wittman Bonzo
