= Marcoux-Bromberg Special =

1930s American single-occupant monoplane

- Marcoux-Bromberg Special NX14215 at the New England Air Museum

General information
- Type: Racing aircraft
- National origin: United States
- Manufacturer: Hal W. Marcoux, Jack Bromberg
- Designer: Keith Rider
- Status: On exhibit at the New England Air Museum
- Primary user: Earl Ortman
- Number built: 1

History
- Manufactured: 1936-1937
- Introduction date: 1933
- First flight: 1934
- Retired: 1939 National Air Races
- Developed from: Rider R-3

The Marcoux-Bromberg Special, also known as the Marcoux-Bromberg R-3 or Rider R-3/Marcoux-Bromberg Special, is a low-wing, single-occupant monoplane that competed in land-based air races from 1936 until 1939. Designed by Keith Rider and constructed in 1933 as the Rider R-3, it went through numerous redesigns to improve performance, and in 1936 was renamed the Marcoux-Bromberg Special under the auspice of owner Hal W. Marcoux and co-sponsor Jack Bromberg, both of Douglas Aircraft. From 1936 its sole pilot was Earl Ortman, who competed in the Thompson Trophy race from 1936 until 1939, taking consecutive second-place finishes in his first three showings and third-place in his last. He also took runner-up at the Bendix Trophy race in 1937. He won the Golden Gate Classic air race from Oakland, California to San Diego, California in 1938.

The aircraft (pictured) was acquired by the New England Air Museum in 1979, where it remains on exhibit.

== Design and development ==
The Marcoux-Bromberg Special is a low-wing monoplane powered by a tractor-mounted Pratt & Whitney R-1535 Twin Wasp Junior 14-cylinder radial engine fitted under a NACA cowling with flaps, and a Hamilton Standard constant-speed, controllable-pitch three-bladed propeller. The conventional landing gear consists of main wheels that retract rearward but not completely inside the wing surface, and a tail skid. The unbraced cantilever wing has straight leading and trailing edges with ailerons and flaps, with wingtips that are rounded and fillets at the wind root. The vertical tail fin is a straight-edge, broad-length triangle identical to those of other Keith Rider designs, with the rudder being trim-tabbed, while a wire-braced elevator is placed mid-height near the top of the fuselage. The cockpit is fully enclosed and set behind the wing.

As the R-3

The R-3 "Gilmore the Record Breaker" in 1935 with airmen (l-r) Roscoe Turner and Earl Ortman

The aircraft began its life in 1933 as the Rider R-3, built for Edith Boydston Clark of Santa Monica, California and designed by Keith Rider, who introduced similar designs such as the R-4, R-5 and R-6. The aircraft was constructed in a West Los Angeles window frame factory, and intended to compete in the 1934 MacRobertson and Bendix Trophy races piloted by James E. Granger. Its first flight ended with the craft flipping on its nose as it landed, killing Granger. The aircraft was repaired, but too late to meet the entry deadline for the MacRobertson or Bendix races. Distinguishing the R-3 visually from its later iteration, the Marcoux-Bromberg Special, was a shorter engine cowl, which featured teardrop-shaped blisters (pictured).

As the Marcoux-Bromberg Special

In 1936 ownership of the aircraft went to Hal Marcoux, an employee at Douglas Aircraft. Enlisting the help of Jack Bromberg, an engineer at Douglas, the pair undertook numerous changes to the airframe and powerplant, ultimately renaming it the Marcoux-Bromberg Special.

In 1937 further improvements to the aircraft included the single-row Pratt & Whitney Wasp Sr. being swapped for a twin-row Wasp Jr. and fitted with a 46 in (1.2 m) diameter NACA cowling with flaps and the three-bladed propeller. This added another 7 in (0.18 m) forward of the wing, making the overall length 22.25 ft (6.78 m). The larger engine necessitated the addition of heavy longitudinal members to the forward fuselage, and a new fuel system with larger tanks. To counter the additional weight of the powerplant, the landing gear was modified to support it, and a new enclosed cockpit was moved rearward. All skin between the cowl and the aft edge of the cockpit was replaced.

For 1938, the fuselage diameter was increased to conform with the engine cowling's diameter. An additional oil cooler was fitted, as well as two gallon oil tank in the extreme rear fuselage, controlled by a valve. When filled, this shifted the center of gravity aft to prevent nose-over or propeller ground-strikes during landing and taxiing.

== Operational history ==
Marcoux-Bromberg Special (middle aircraft) at the 1938 Thompson Trophy air race

The aircraft distinguished itself as a competitive air racer through numerous design and powerplant improvements that began in 1935 on the R-3. That year it set a flight record from San Francisco to Los Angeles, piloted by aviation engineer Vance Breese.

In 1935 Earl Hill Ortman was hired to fly the R-3, based on his experience with piloting earlier Keith Rider designs. In July he flew the Canada to Mexico route in under 5½ hours and an average speed of 242 mph (389 km/h), setting a record that stood for 2 years. For the 1935 Bendix Trophy, a larger engine was fitted shortly before the race. While being flown to Cleveland for the 1935 Thompson Trophy, mishaps and repairs rendered the aircraft unairworthy according to Thompson officials, so was returned to California.

From 1936 to 1938, Ortman was the only aviator to pilot the Marcoux-Bromberg Special, his name described as "almost synonymous" with the aircraft. With it he vied for the Thompson Trophy from 1936 until 1939. His first entry in 1936 ended with a second-place finish with an average race speed of 228 mph (367 km/h). The following year, he took the lead late in the race but failed to hold it at the last minute, repeating the previous year's performance with another second-place finish. At the 1938 Thompson Trophy race (pictured), following a 270.473 mph (435.284 km/h) qualifying run and a second 280.03 mph (450.66 km/h) run the following day, he clocked an average speed of 269.718 mph (434.069 km/h) and his third straight second-place finish. At his forth and final showing in 1939 he finished third in a field of seven aircraft.

He also competed at the Bendix Transcontinental Race in 1937, where he took runner-up. At the closed-course Louis W. Greve Trophy Race in Cleveland the same year he clocked the fastest qualification of 263.023 mph (423.294 km/h). In 1938 he won the Golden Gate Classic air race from Oakland, California to San Diego, California, clocking his fastest average speed of 273 mph (439 km/h).

The 1939 Thompson Trophy Race was the last race for the Marcoux-Bromberg Special, which then retired.

== On exhibit ==
Marcoux-Bromberg Special at the New England Air Museum

The Marcoux-Bromberg Special was the only example ever constructed. With the advent of World War II, air racing was suspended and with it the aircraft was stored in hangers or left languishing outdoors for forty years. Owned by Rudy Profant, a racing buff, he stated "It was a difficult airplane to fly. The big Twin Wasp Junior engine made the air-plane nose heavy."

In 1979 the aircraft was acquired by the Bradley Air Museum, today the New England Air Museum, where it remains on exhibit (pictured).

== Media appearance ==
The Marcoux-Bromberg Special appeared in the 1938 film Test Pilot directed by Victor Fleming and staring Clark Gable.

== Specifications ==
(Marcoux-Bromberg Special 1937 modifications)

Data from

General characteristics

- Crew: 1
- Length: 22 ft 3 in (6.78 m)
- Wingspan: 22 ft 3 in (6.78 m)
- Height: 6 ft 1.0 in (1.854 m)
- Airfoil: Modified 23012, thicker section, blunt leading edge
- Powerplant: 1 × Pratt & Whitney R-1340-S1A5-G Twin Wasp Jr. 14-cyl. air-cooled radial piston engine, 500–525 hp (373–391 kW)
- Propellers: 3-bladed Hamilton Standard fixed

Performance

- Maximum speed: 280 mph (450 km/h, 240 kn) fastest qualifying speed at 1938 Thompson Trophy race

273 mph (439 km/h) fastest average speed at 1938 Golden Gate Classic

== See also ==
Related development

- Rider R-2
- Rider R-5
- Rider R-6

Aircraft of comparable role, configuration, and era

- Laird-Turner Meteor LTR-14
- Wedell-Williams Model 44

== Notes, citations and sources ==
=== Sources ===
Newsprint

- "Five Air Kings Poised To Hop In Bendix Race". Los Angeles Evening Citizen News. Vol. 20, no. 130. 30 Aug 1934. p. 11 – via Newspapers.com. "James E. Granger of Clover Field, Santa Monica, today was hurrying last minute preparations on his Keith-Rider ship"
- "Plane Speed Bid Planned". The Los Angeles Times. Vol. LIV. 26 Mar 1935. p. 26 – via Newspapers.com. "Keith Rider air racer owned by Mrs. Edith Boydston Clark, Santa Monica sportswoman"
- "Vance Breese Sets New Plane Record". The Edwardsville Intelligencer. Vol. 73, no. 118. 18 May 1935. p. 3 – via Newspapers.com. "new record of one hour, 11 minutes and 56 seconds for a San Francisco to Los Angeles flight."
- "Three Flag Record Set". The Los Angeles Times. Vol. LIV. 4 July 1935. p. 1 – via Newspapers.com. "Earl Ortman Flies From Vancouver to Mexico in Fast Time."
- Boyl, Jahn W. (6 Sep 1937). "Kling Wins Greve Trophy Race in Close Finish". The Long Beach Sun. p. 1 – via Newspapers.com. "Earlier in the day, Earl Ortman, tow-headed Los Angeles flier, electrified the crowd"
- "Seven Planes Qualify for Aerial Races". The Florida Times-Union. Vol. LXXIII. 2 Sep 1938. p. 1 – via Newspapers.com. "Speeds in Preliminary Tests Range from 214 to 280 Miles."
- "Turner Col. Roscoe Wins Trophy Race". The State Journal-Register. Vol. 108. 6 Sep 1939. p. 12 – via Newspapers.com. "Earl Ortman, Montreal, in a Marcoux-Bromberg special, took third"
- "Famed 'stubby racer' joins Bradley Air Museum elite". Connecticut Post. Vol. LXXXIX, no. 40. 8 Oct 1978. p. 131 – via Newspapers.com. "Pratt & Whitney Aircraft R-1535 Twin Wasp Junior...was used in the last version of the version of the R-3 racer."
- "Air museum to get distinguished racer". The Morning Union. Vol. 101, no. 23. 18 Feb 1979. p. 1 – via Newspapers.com. "The sleek airplane, was purchased by a Pratt & Whitney Aircraft Group grant to the Bradley Air Museum."
- Elliott, Jack (13 Aug 1989). "Connecticut museum soars with spirit of flight". The Star-Ledger. Vol. 76, no. 166. p. 58 – via Newspapers.com. "The Marcoux-Bromberg Special (1934) which was featured in the movie, "Test Pilot," (1938) with Clark Gable"

Websites

- "Famous Record Breaking and Racing Pilots: Earl Ortman". Air Racing History. "Ortman was the only pilot this famous racer was to know throughout its long racing career."
- "Keith Rider R-3/Marcoux-Bromberg Special". Air Racing History. "The airplane was retired after the 1939 Thompson."
- "Earl Ortman". American Aviation Historical Society. "the perennial second-place finisher did it again in this updated Keith Rider R-3, now called the "Marcoux-Bromberg Special.""
- "The Keith Rider R-3/Marcoux-Bromberg Special". Airminded. "The Marcoux-Bromberg Special started life in 1933"
