= Military Aircraft HM-1 =

American prototype aircraft

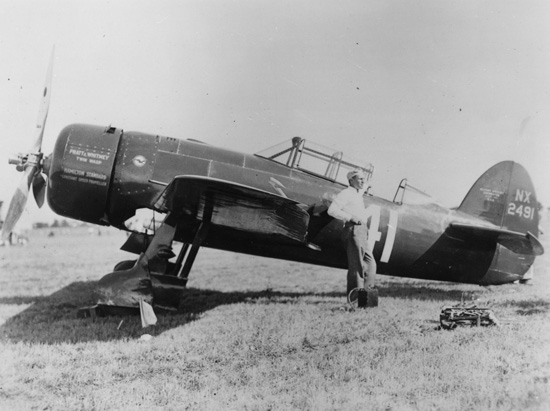
- Pilot Leigh Wade and the Military Aircraft HM-1 at the 1938 Thompson Trophy race

General information
- Type: Racing aircraft
- Manufacturer: Miller Aviation Corporation
- Designer: Howell W. "Pete" Miller
- Number built: 1

History
- First flight: October 18, 1936 (earlier Hawks Miller HM-1)
- Developed from: Hawks Miller HM-1

The Military Aircraft HM-1, derived from the earlier Hawks Miller HM-1 racing aircraft nicknamed "Time Flies", was an American prototype attack/observation aircraft. The HM-1 did not achieve production after the sole example was destroyed during testing.

== Design and development ==
In 1936, Frank Hawks had approached Howell W. "Pete" Miller, chief engineer for the Granville Brothers and responsible for their famous Gee Bee racers, to create a racing aircraft from his own design, the Hawks Miller HM-1. With an advanced aircraft design that still relied heavily on wood construction, the HM-1 featured innovative design elements, including the unusual feature of "burying" the cockpit with a curved windshield contoured to fit the fuselage top, creating a very streamlined shape. The cockpit was extended for takeoff and landing, but retracted in flight, with the pilot's seat lowered and the windshield becoming flush with the fuselage.

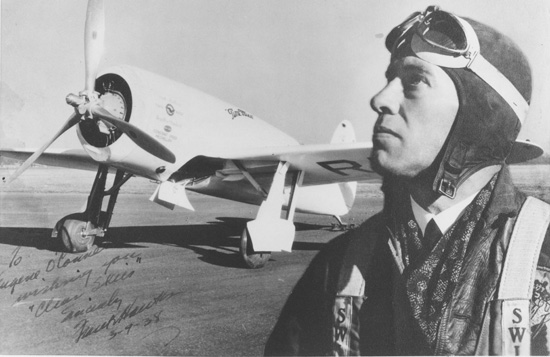
Frank Hawks and "Time Flies", c. 1936

After its first flight on October 18, 1936, Hawks flew "Time Flies", from Hartford, Connecticut, to Miami, Florida, on April 13, 1937, in 4 hours and 55 minutes. He then flew to Newark Airport, New Jersey, in 4 hours and 21 minutes, but bounced on landing at Newark, and broke a wooden spar in the right wing with other spars also damaged.

Short of funds, Hawks decided not to rebuild the aircraft and sold the rights to the design, including engineering data to Tri-American Aviation, a concern that wanted to convert the design into a fast two-seat attack/observation aircraft. The aircraft was redesigned to include two machine guns in the wings and another machine gun mounted in a flexible mount in the new rear cockpit. (Note: Only dummy armament fittings were ever carried.)

== Operational history ==
The principals of Tri-American Aviation, Leigh Wade and Edward Connerton, engaged Miller to rebuild the aircraft in 1938 as a two-seater with a more conventional greenhouse canopy added, looking a great deal like Miller's earlier Gee Bee Q.E.D. design. The aircraft was first renamed the Miller HM-2, but when company was reorganized as the Miller Aircraft Co., it was called the MAC-1 and Military Aircraft HM-1, although often described in the press as the "Hawks Military Racer", although Hawks was no longer actively involved.

With the intention to demonstrate the aircraft's potential, pilot Leigh Wade entered the MAC-1/HM-1 in the 1938 Thompson Trophy race. In essentially military configuration with dummy machine guns fitted, Wade flew the aircraft to a fourth-place finish. (Note: The prototype was not fully sorted out when entered, and although capable of a high turn of speed, the fuel consumption on the Twin Wasp was prodigious. Wade had to throttle back in order to even finish the race, precluding any chance of showing the true potential of the aircraft, which had demonstrated a 90 mph (140 km/h) mph advantage over the current United States Army Air Corps (USAAC) Seversky P-35 fighter aircraft.)

Despite the showing in the Thompson race, the U.S. military considered the predominantly wood construction in the design as unsuitable. Air racer and test pilot Earl Ortman was hired to fly the HM-1 at East Hartford, Connecticut where a 25 miles (40 km) course was laid out to display flight capabilities for foreign military interests, and seek out military contracts. (Note: Tri-American had interests in South America, the likely place to sell the HM-1.)

On August 23, 1938, Ortman flew above Rentschler Field, adjacent to the Pratt & Whitney Aircraft factory where their employees and Hamilton Standard technicians were available. He made four passes over the course in the HM-1, achieving an average speed of 369 mph (594 km/h). The next phase of the testing called for determination of climb rates. From 1,000 ft (304.93 m), Ortman climbed to 10,000 ft (3,048 m), then to dive down to 1,000 ft (304.93 m) and start up on another climb.

On his final dive, at a reported 425 mph (684 km/h), the fuel in tanks was being transferred when the stresses placed on the wings were too great and a wing sheared off. Ortman was able to bail out safely, but the aircraft was demolished and the project was abandoned. (Note: On August 23, 1938, Frank Hawks had contacted Miller for an update on the HM-1 project but on the same day, had later died in an air crash when flying his latest project, the revolutionary Gwinn Aircar.)

== Specifications (Military Aircraft HM-1) ==
General characteristics

- Crew: 2
- Length: 23 ft 6 in (7.16 m)
- Wingspan: 30 ft 0 in (9.14 m)
- Wing area: 525.0 sq ft (48.77 m^{2})
- Empty weight: 1,840 lb (835 kg)
- Powerplant: 1 × Pratt & Whitney R-1830 Twin Wasp 14-cyl. two-row air-cooled radial piston engine, 1,150 hp (860 kW)

Performance

- Maximum speed: 375 mph (604 km/h, 326 kn)
