= Colonial Airlines =

Canadian airline that merged into Eastern Air Lines in 1956

- Founded: March 6, 1928 (as Canadian Colonial Airways)
- Commenced operations: October 1, 1928
- Ceased operations: June 1, 1956 (merged into Eastern Air Lines

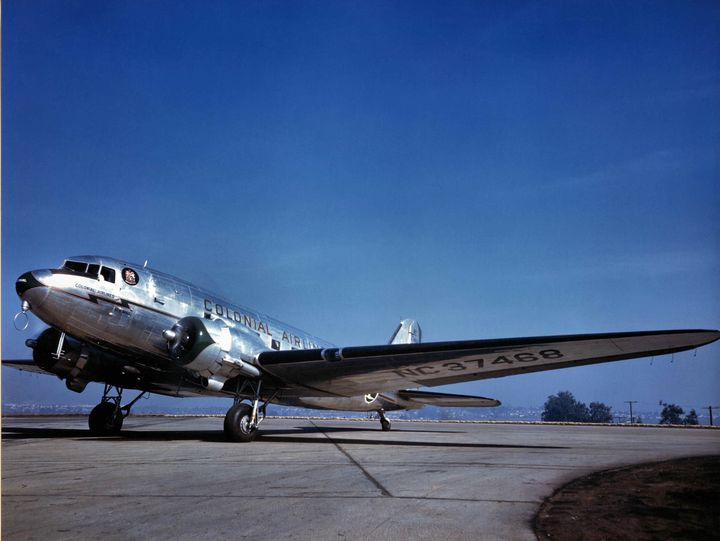
Colonial Airlines Douglas DC-3

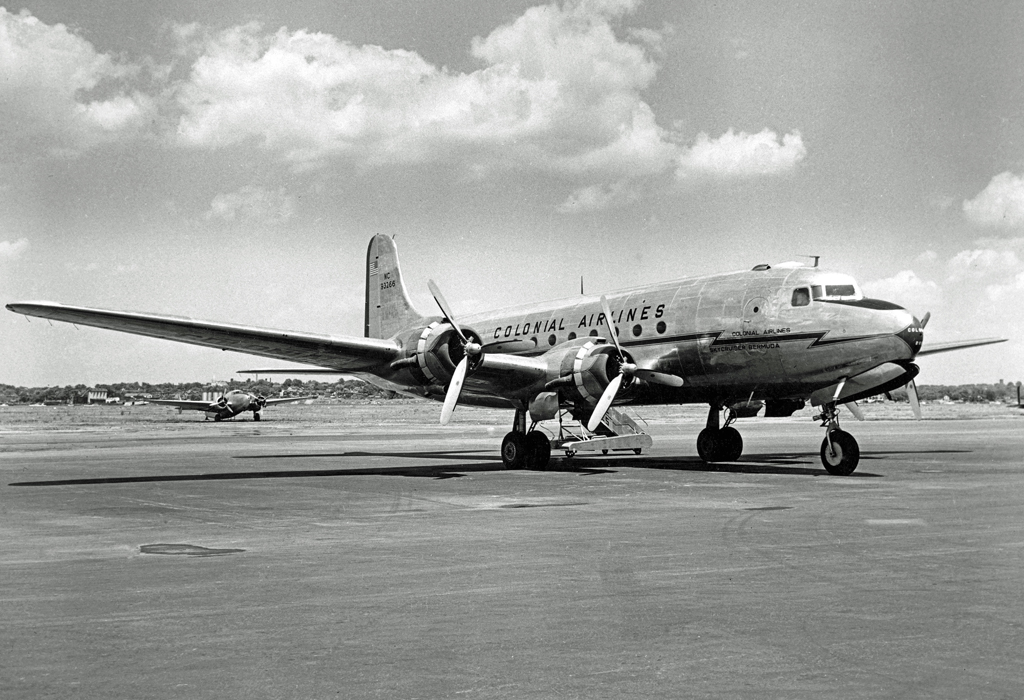
Douglas DC-4 of Colonial Airlines, used on routes to Canada and Bermuda

Colonial Airlines was a United States trunk carrier, a scheduled airline that operated from 1928 to 1956 with bases at LaGuardia Airport (LGA) in New York City and at Montréal/Saint-Hubert Airport in Montreal, Quebec, Canada, before merging into Eastern Air Lines.

== History ==
It was founded as Canadian Colonial Airways on 6 March 1928 to operate Foreign Air Mail Route No. 1 (FAM-1) from New York to Montreal via Albany, New York. Services began to Canada on 1 October 1928, in conjunction with Canadian Colonial Airways, Ltd. its 100%-owned Canadian subsidiary. The Fairchild FC-2 was among the aircraft types used.

Pursuant to the Civil Aeronautics Act of 1938, the Civil Aeronautics Authority (CAA) of the United States certificated the US version of the airline as a United States scheduled airline on January 9, 1940. Thereafter, the Civil Aeronautics Board (CAB), which succeeded the CAA in 1940, regulated Canadian Colonial Airways as a trunk carrier.

However, the CAB refused a foreign carrier permit for the Canadian subsidiary to operate to the US and directed it to cease flying to the US. The Canadian subsidiary ceased operations on June 30, 1942.

After acquisition by a group of investors, the airline was renamed Colonial Airlines on 30 April 1942.

Postwar period

The airline was awarded a route from Washington, D.C. to Montreal and Ottawa on 10 August 1945, followed by routes to Bermuda in May 1946. Scheduled flights to the latter began on 1 August 1947. The shorter routes were operated by Douglas DC-3s and the longer routes by Douglas DC-4s.

By 1956, Colonial's executive offices were on Park Avenue in New York City and it was flying several routes including five daily nonstop DC-4 flights between LGA and Montreal. It also operated a nonstop DC-4 flight departing LGA at 11 am EST to Bermuda, arriving at Kindley Field 3:35 pm AST, with timetables advertising a "full course hot meal" served en route. It also offered a DC-3 puddle jumper flight from LGA making an 11:50 am Monday–Friday flag stop at Poughkeepsie's Dutchess County Airport en route to Montreal and Ottawa, Canada, with intermediate stops at Albany, New York, Rutland, Vermont, and Burlington, Vermont.

== Merger with Eastern Air Lines ==
The airline operated for a period of five years during which a fierce competition was fought for its control between Eastern Air Lines and National Airlines. After several reversals of government policy, Eastern Air Lines emerged as the acquirer and the operational merger took place on 1 June 1956. A few years following the merger, many of the Colonial's more rural destinations were deleted from Eastern's route network. Eastern was bought by Texas Air Corporation in 1986. In 1991 Eastern Air Lines ceased operation and some of its assets were assigned to Continental Airlines. In 2010 Continental merged with United Airlines.

== Fleet ==
At the time of the merger, Colonial had eight DC-3 and five DC-4 aircraft.

== Destinations ==
- Maryland
  - Baltimore (Friendship International Airport) now BWI
- New York
  - Albany (Albany International Airport)
  - Buffalo (Buffalo Niagara International Airport)
  - Glens Falls (Floyd Bennett Memorial Airport)*
  - Massena (Massena International Airport)
  - Malone (Malone-Dufort Airport)
  - New York (LaGuardia Airport)
  - Plattsburgh (Clinton County Airport)*
  - Poughkeepsie (Dutchess County Airport)*
  - Saranac Lake (Adirondack Regional Airport)
  - Syracuse (Syracuse Hancock International Airport)
  - Watertown (Watertown International Airport)
- Ontario, Canada
  - Toronto (Toronto Pearson International Airport)
  - Ottawa (Ottawa Macdonald–Cartier International Airport)
- Pennsylvania
  - Reading (Reading Regional Airport)*
  - Wilkes-Barre/Scranton (Wilkes-Barre/Scranton International Airport
- Quebec, Canada
  - Montréal (Montréal-Dorval)
- Vermont
  - Burlington (Burlington International Airport)
  - Rutland (Rutland State Airport)
- Virginia
  - Washington, D.C. (Ronald Reagan Washington National Airport)
- Bermuda
  - Kindley Field, now Bermuda International Airport

Those airports marked with an asterisk (*) no longer have scheduled passenger air service.

== See also ==
- List of defunct airlines of the United States
