= Frank Hawks =

American aviator

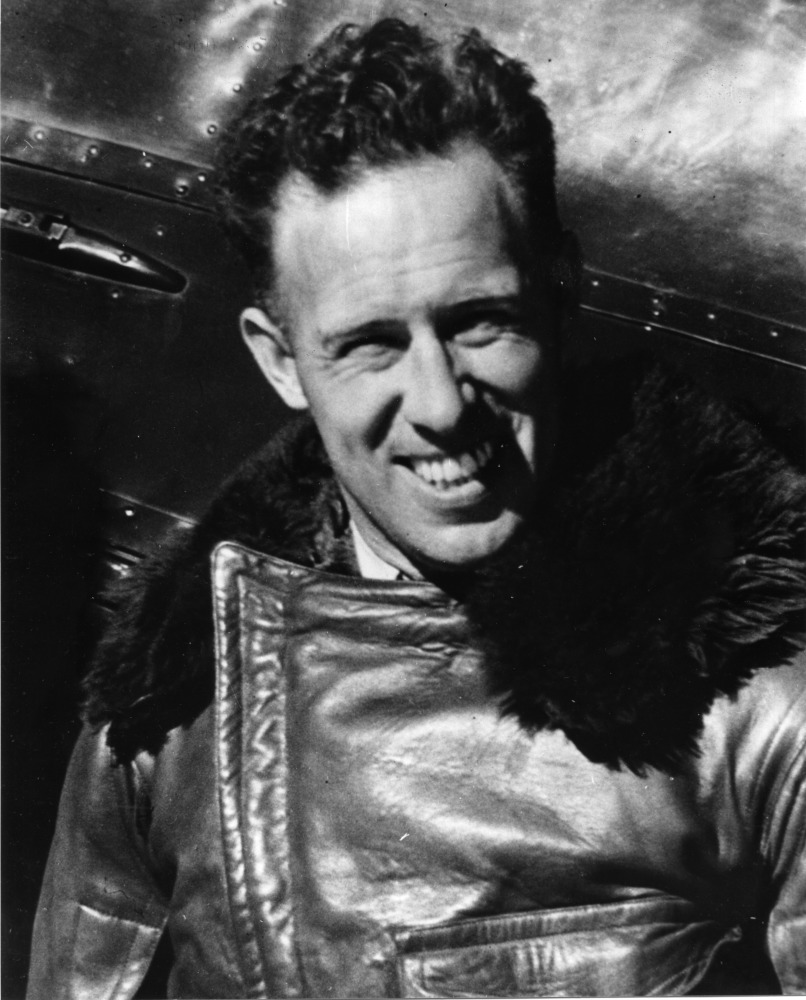
- Born: March 28, 1897; Marshalltown, Iowa, U.S.
- Died: August 23, 1938 (aged 41); East Aurora, New York, U.S.
- Occupations: Pilot, designer, author, actor, spokesperson
- Spouse(s): Newell Lane (Divorced); Edith Bowie Hawks
- Parent(s): Charles M. Hawks and Ida Mae Hawks

Frank Monroe Hawks (March 28, 1897 – August 23, 1938) was a pilot in the United States Army Air Service during World War I and was known during the 1920s and 1930s as a record breaking aviator, using a series of Texaco-sponsored aircraft and setting 214 point-to-point records in the United States and Europe. Prolific in the media and continually in the "public eye", in the 1937 The Mysterious Pilot movie serial, Hawks was billed as the "fastest airman in the world." A popular saying from the time was, "Don't send it by mail ... send it by Hawks." After retiring from a career as an air racer, he died in 1938, flying an experimental aircraft.

== Early years ==
Born in Marshalltown, Iowa, on March 28, 1897, Hawks attended grammar school before his parents who were actors, joined a stock company and toured Minnesota. Hawks took on juvenile parts during his parents' engagements but when the family settled in California, Hawks resumed his formal schooling and graduated in 1916 from a high school in Long Beach. An early exposure to the thrill of flying came when Hawks convinced local Long Beach air field owners, the Christofferson brothers, to give him a free flight in exchange for a newspaper article. He had convinced the owners that a high school student's impressions would result in increased interest in flying and more business for the air field. It worked and Hawks was able to parlay a series of pleasure flights. After enrolling at the University of California where he played halfback on the freshman football team, Hawks enlisted in 1917 when war was declared.

== World War I ==
Hawks joined the U.S. Army with the aspiration to become a pilot in the Aviation Section, U.S. Signal Corps. After he received his Junior Military Aviator rating and a second lieutenant's commission in the Signal Officer's Reserve Corps, Hawks became a flying instructor at Dallas Love Field, Texas, receiving a promotion to first lieutenant and a short time later was made the assistant officer in charge of flying at U.S. Army Air Service's Brooks Field at San Antonio, Texas. One incident that nearly proved fatal occurred when Hawks and Lieutenant Wendell Brookley collided in midair over the San Antonio football stadium. Both pilots were carrying out an exuberant aerial exhibition to support the United War Work campaign when the aircraft tangled but they managed to land their damaged aircraft, only to receive a reprimand for dangerous flying. Both flyers served a week in confinement.

Leaving active duty in 1919, Hawks was promoted to captain in the United States Army Air Service Reserve. During the immediate postwar years, he did a stint of aerial barnstorming in the United States and Mexico. Besides his barnstorming feats, Hawks became known for his appearances at aerial exhibitions and on December 28, 1920, he took a 23-year-old Amelia Earhart on her first flight at a state fair in Los Angeles, California. Earhart's father arranged for the flight and paid the fee of $10 for a 10-minute "hop".

== Achieving fame as a pilot ==
Hawks began to be in public eye when he joined the Gates Flying Circus and was involved in a demonstration of the first in-flight refueling in 1921. Earl Daugherty in his JN4D Jenny had been touted as being able to stay in the air for 24 hours. Hawks flew his Standard J-1 World War I trainer carrying wing-walker Wesley May aloft to join up with Daugherty, circling over Long Beach, California. May, carrying a five-gallon can of gasoline, stepped over to Earl's ship and poured the gas in the Jenny's tank.

On May 7, 1922, Hawks landed his small Standard biplane within the grounds at the Stadium Jalapeño at Xalapa, Veracruz, Mexico, as part of the inaugural ceremonies. In 1924 Hawks was hired by Compañía Mexicana de Aviación as a pilot flying special charter service routes, piloting his Standard J-1 two-place modified for five-place passenger service. While in Mexico, Hawks managed a large 30,000-acre (120 km^{2}) ranch and estate near Tampico, using his aircraft to fly to Mexico City and back, to run errands such as carrying payrolls to the oil field companies operating around Tampico.

By 1927, Hawks continued to eke out a living as a pilot but with money from his wife, he purchased a Mahoney Ryan B-1 Brougham (NC3009) he named the "Spirit of San Diego." In the aftermath of Charles Lindbergh's transatlantic flight, he flew to Washington with his wife on board, to greet the triumphant Lindbergh, and in the ensuing glare of publicity, Hawks was hired by the Ryan Aircraft Company to be its official representative. In the Ford National Reliability Air Tour, Hawks placed sixth and earned $1,000 in prize money. With the public idolizing Lindbergh, Hawks toured the country, selling rides in the aircraft "like Lindy flew."

=== Record breaking flights ===
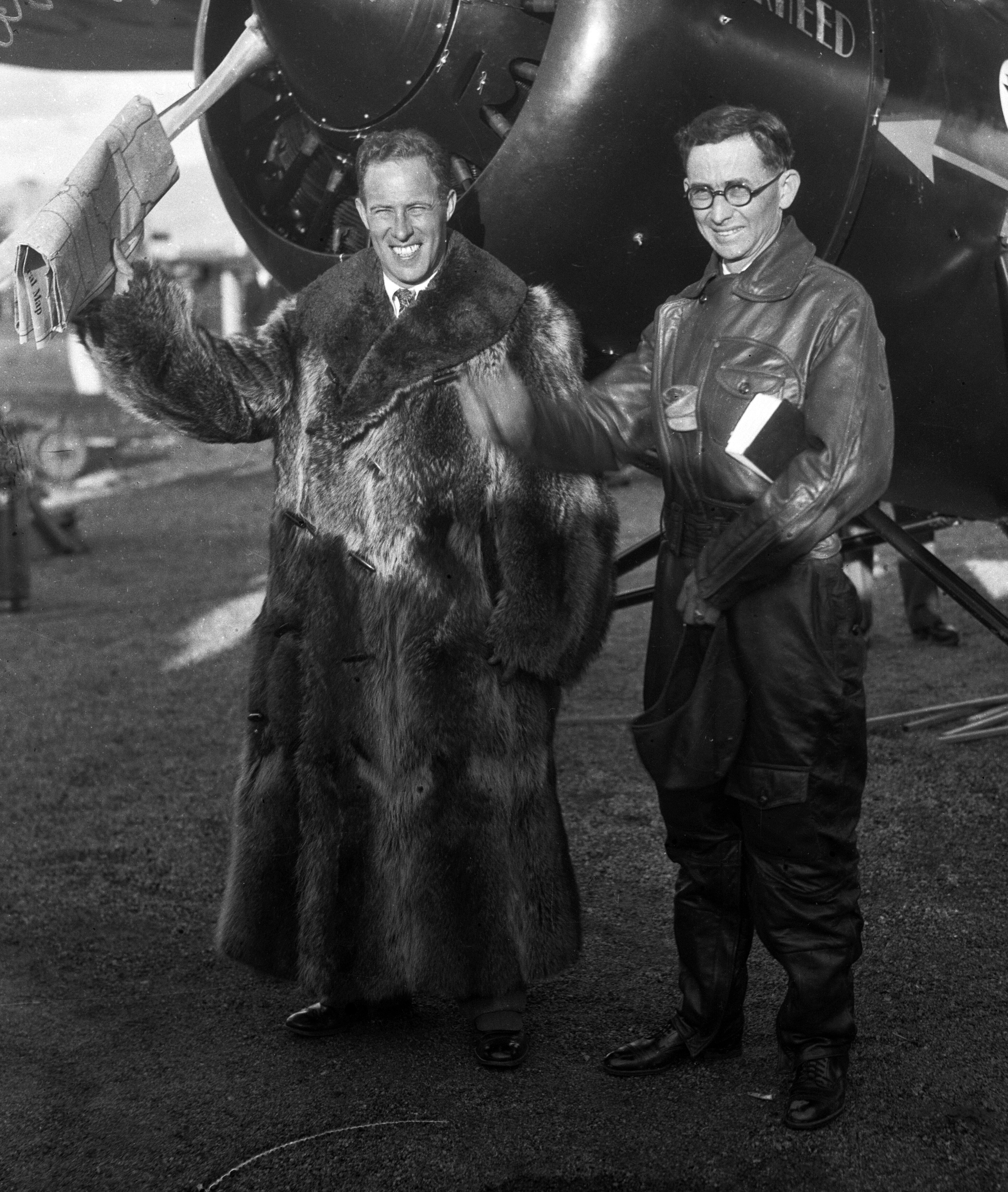
Hawks with Oscar Grubb in 1929 before setting a transcontinental speed record

The notoriety that Hawks gained by his self-promotion led to a contract with Maxwell House Coffee and with their sponsorship, he entered the 1927 National Air Races in Spokane, Washington, where the now renamed "Miss Maxwell House" came in first for speed in the Detroit News Air Transport Speed and Efficiency Trophy Race. Also on December 5, 1927, the Texas Company (Texaco) hired Hawks to head up its own Aviation Division as a Superintendent to market aviation products. The "Texaco One", a custom-built Ford Trimotor (NC3443) was delivered in January 1928 and Hawks was dispatched to advertise the company across the United States and abroad, beginning with flying a Texas delegation from Houston to Mexico City and back. It was the first goodwill trade extension air tour from the United States to Mexico and received wide coverage in American and Mexican newspapers.

Later in the same year, Hawks embarked on a nationwide goodwill tour, visiting more than 150 cities and covering approximately 51,000 miles (82,000 km). It was estimated that 500,000 people saw the "Texaco One". He described the tour in his autobiography Speed: "In the course [of the tour]. I visited 175 cities, carried 7,200 passengers, and did 56,000 miles of cross-country flying. All of this without a mishap to plane and passengers."

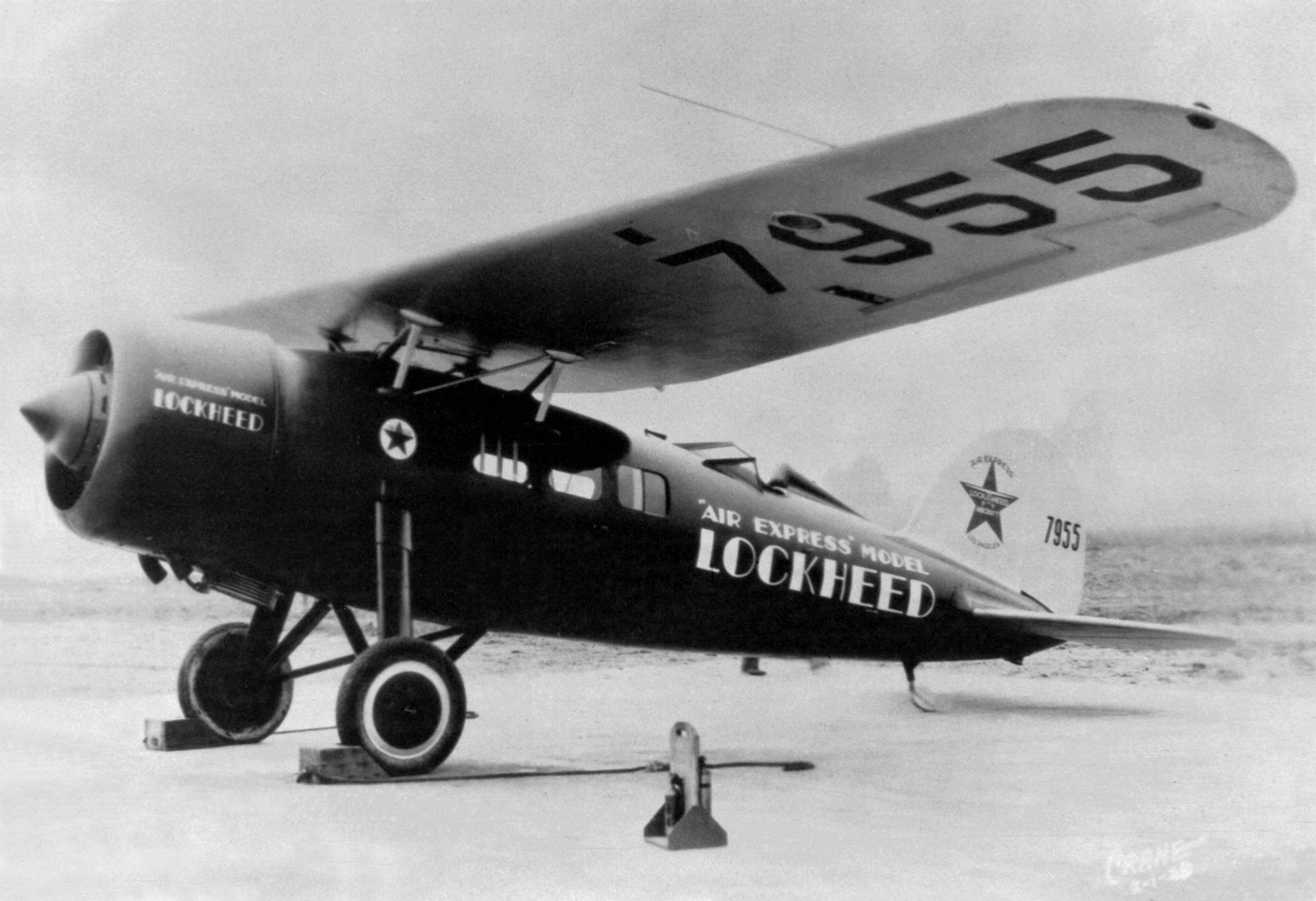
"Texaco Five"

In December 1928, the Trimotor was destroyed in a crash at Floresville, Florida. In early 1929, Hawks was approached by Lockheed to ferry their new Air Express (NR7955) to New York in time for an air show. On February 4, 1929, flying with Oscar Grubb, superintendent of final assembly at the Lockheed factory, who had volunteered to serve as flight engineer to pump fuel from auxiliary fuselage tanks, Hawks set a transcontinental speed record. He flew from the Lockheed factory in Burbank, California, to New York in 18 hours and 21 minutes.

Hawks shortly after convinced Texaco to purchase the record-breaking Lockheed Air Express named "Texaco Five" as a replacement for "Texaco One". Four months later, Hawks shattered the record again by 43 minutes in "Texaco Five". The aircraft accumulated some 90,000 miles (140,000 km) before being lost in a 17 January 1930 accident when Hawks attempted a takeoff from a soggy field in West Palm Beach, Florida, destroying the "Texaco Five" in a spectacular crash that catapulted it into a row of three parked aircraft. Hawks walked away with no injuries.

Frank Hawks in the Texaco Eaglet, postcard, c. 1930

=== Gliding ===
In 1930, Hawks convinced Texaco to back a proving flight that would demonstrate the effectiveness of gliders. As a reserve officer in what was by then known as the United States Army Air Corps, Hawks foresaw the military usefulness of gliders, and despite a lack of government support and critical reaction from seasoned glider pilots, Hawks mapped out a transcontinental flight. The appropriately named Texaco Eaglet was a custom-made 50-foot (15 m) wingspan glider built by R.E. and Wallace Franklin. Designed to achieve a maximum speed of 125 miles per hour, it was fitted with a two-way radio and telephone connection with the tow plane, the "Texaco 7", a Waco ASO biplane, flown by J. D. "Duke" Jernigan, Jr., a member of Texaco's domestic sales division.

The flight left San Diego on March 30, 1930, with Hawks being attached by a 500 ft (150 m) towline, taking eight days elapsed time and 44 hours, 10 minutes of actual flying time. Hawks also spent 10 hours in soaring exhibitions at scores of towns and cities along the route. Surmounting all the predicted obstacles, even the Rocky Mountains which German glider pilots had feared would jeopardize the flight, only occasional turbulence was encountered. Hawks arrived in New York on April 6, 1930, effectively proving the feasibility of long-distance glider-towing.

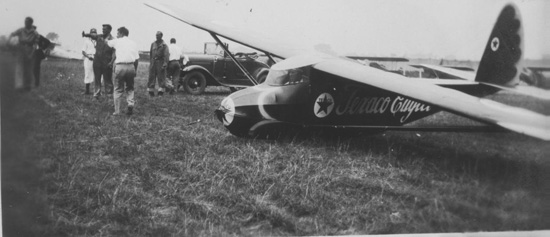
Frank Hawks in the Texaco Eaglet c. 1930

=== Texaco 13 ===
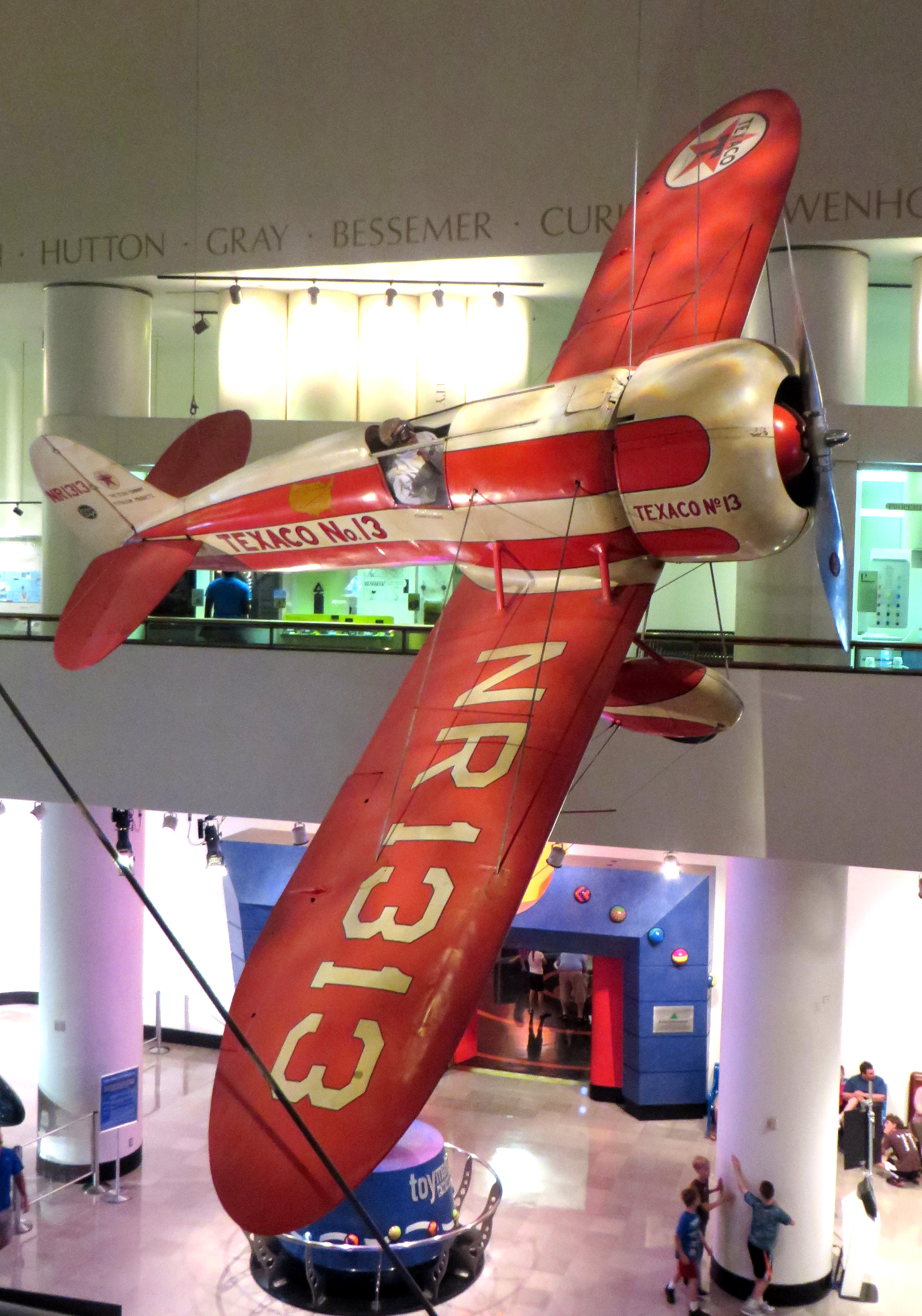
"Texaco 13" at the Museum of Science and Industry (Chicago), c. 2007 is a testament to the 1930s "Golden era" of air racing and Frank Hawks.

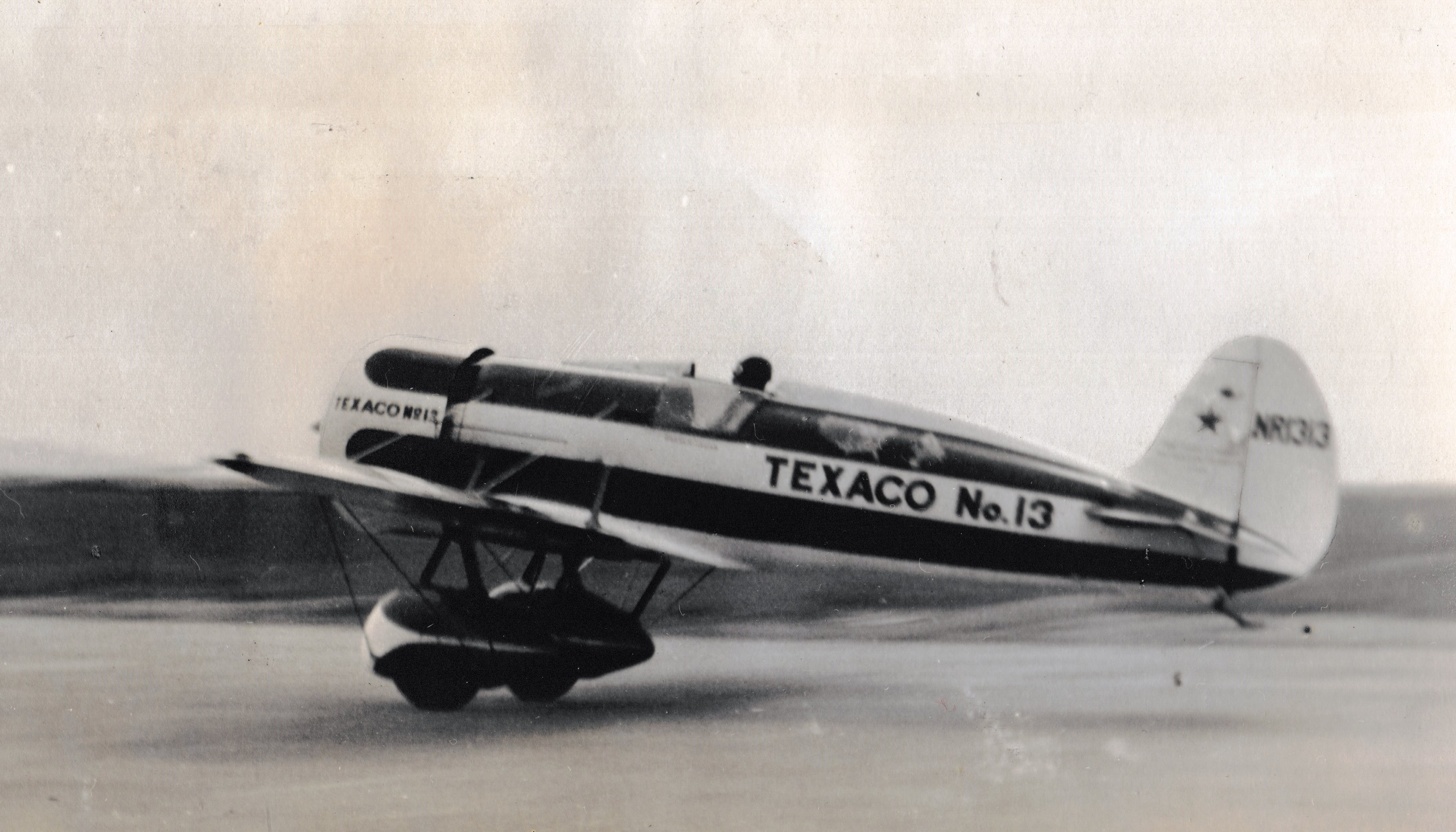
Frank Hawks in his Travel Air. St. Hubert airport, Montreal. c. 1930

In 1930, Hawks proposed that Texaco replace the lost "Texaco Five" with a revolutionary new racing aircraft, the Travel Air Type R Mystery Ship that had been debuted at the 1929 National Air Races where its turn-of-speed saw it best the latest United States Army and Navy fighters. While overseeing the construction of "Texaco 13" (NR1313), Hawks was involved in an accident on a test flight when the engine failed. Hawks tried to coax "Texaco 13" back but hit telephone lines at the edge of the factory field; the aircraft crashed nose-first and flipped onto its back. Repairs were carried out by the summer of 1930, when Hawks embarked on a series of exhibition flights and record-breaking flights across the United States including a new transcontinental west-to-east record on August 13, 1930, of 12 hours, 25 minutes, three seconds, the fastest crossing up to that time. (Note: Quote: "Behind the name of Captain Frank M. Hawks, in aviation's record book today is set down the time of 12 hours, 25 minutes, 3 seconds for an eastward transcontinental flight, the fastest ever flown by man over the distance of 2,500 miles (4,000 km). It is farther by more than two hours the time made Easter Sunday by Colonel and Mrs. Charles A. Lindbergh. Their record was 14 hours and 45 minutes.")

Hawks in 1930 with Texaco 13

The Travel Air Type R Hawks flew, was the fourth of a series of five racers and was configured for long-distance racing with longer wings and a full set of instrumentation, features that differentiated the aircraft from the rest of the series. Hawks raced "Texaco 13" as "race No. 28" in the 1930 Thompson Trophy Race at the National Air Races on September 1, 1930, using a set of "racing wings", a pair of shorter wingspan wings fitted out at the factory. Hawks pulled out of the race on the third lap when the engine began to falter at full throttle. It was revealed later that a piece of masking tape placed over the gas cap (for streamlining) caused a loss of pressure.

Hawks used the media attention that was garnered by his record flights to promote aviation, especially demonstrating that fast courier air service was feasible. On October 7, 1930, with the completion of the final World Series game at Philadelphia, Hawks flew to North Beach, Queens, delivering the game photographs exactly 20 minutes later, faster than wire service at the time. Each of his highly publicized flights served to illustrate the speed and safety of modern air travel. His autobiography Speed was also published in 1930, documenting his life and aviation career. The book was well-written and became a highly popular title (still sought-after to this day). During his 20,000-mile (32,000 km) goodwill tour of Europe in 1931, Hawks established 55 intercity records in 12 countries and after returning from Europe in late 1931, continuing to set over 130 American point-to-point records in the "Texaco 13" until April 16, 1932, when the aircraft was heavily damaged in a crash.

=== Crash ===
Time magazine on April 18, 1932, wrote:

Stocky, grinning Capt. Frank Monroe Hawks, famed publicity flyer, holder of nearly all informal city-to-city speed records in the U.S. and Europe, was not grinning one day last week when attendants at the Worcester, Massachusetts airport pulled him from beneath his crashed Travel Air "Mystery Plane" Texaco 13. Day before he had hopped from Detroit (in 3 hr. 5 min.). lectured the Worcester Boy Scouts on the necessity of developing foolproof planes, but had delayed his departure until the next morning because of a soggy field. An escort plane had nosed up when it landed just ahead of Capt. Hawks. After attempting to take off from a short dirt road which cut diagonally across the airport, he headed his low-wing monoplane down the field, less than 700 ft. in length. Oozy ground sucked at the wheels, kept him from attaining the 70 m.p.h. required to zoom off. Toward the end of the runway, going about 50 m.p.h., the ship bounced off a low mound, cut through heavy undergrowth, somersaulted over a stone wall. Hawks cut the motor in time, and saved himself from cremation. Capt. Hawks's nose and jaw were fractured, his face badly battered, several of his big, white teeth knocked out. He lay unconscious in the hospital for hours. Said Harvard Medical School's famed plastic surgeon, Dr. Varaztad Hovhannes Kazanjian: "I do not think his speech will be affected. The operation for restoring his face should leave scarcely a scar." Capt. Hawks's good friend Will Rogers wired: "Sure glad nothing broke but your jaw. That will keep you still for a while. If I broke my jaw, I could still wire gags. What's the matter with you anyhow; are you getting ... brittle?"

Following its repair, the aircraft was subsequently acquired in 1938 by the Museum of Science and Industry in Chicago, Illinois, where it remains on display.

=== More records ===
In June 1932, Hawks left the United States Army Air Corps Reserve, exchanging his commission for that of a United States Naval Reserve lieutenant commander. Texaco purchased the first Northrop Gamma 2A as the replacement for the "Texaco 13". The new aircraft was the first of the Gamma series and was specially designed for Hawks, fitted with then-new Sperry automatic pilot. This sleek, all-metal, high-speed mail and cargo aircraft was powered by a 785 hp (585 kW), 14-cylinder Wright Whirlwind twin-row, air-cooled radial engine and was first called "Texaco 11". The name was later changed to "Sky Chief" when Hawks had been honored by the Sioux Indian nation as a chief. "Texaco Sky Chief" became linked to all Northrop Gammas and was adopted as the name for Texaco's premium gasoline.

Hawks continued to set records in his new aircraft, and on June 2, 1933, he set the west-to-east transcontinental airspeed record in "Texaco Sky Chief", flying from Los Angeles to Floyd Bennett Field, Brooklyn, New York, in 13 hours, 26 minutes, and 15 seconds at an average speed of 181 mph (291 km/h). After setting a bevy of new intercity marks, Hawks resigned from Texaco in 1935, but remained active as an aviation consultant and a test and demonstration pilot.

Northrop hired him to fly the Gamma 2E attack bomber, a conversion of the original Gamma 2A. He demonstrated the aircraft to the Argentine Navy and effectively demonstrating the long-distance capabilities of the new type by flying 8,090 miles (13,020 km) from Buenos Aires to Los Angeles in three days. Taking off on May 3, 1935, with Gage H. Irving, Northrop's chief test pilot in the gunner's seat, Hawks broke 10 intercity speed records on the way to Los Angeles, with the resultant publicity ultimately responsible for orders of 51 Gamma 2E attack aircraft.

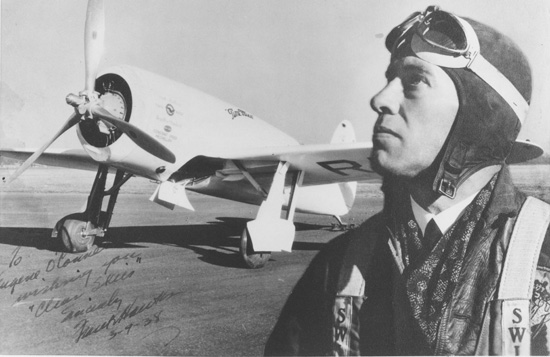
Frank Hawks and "Time Flies"

=== Designing his own aircraft ===
In 1936, Hawks approached Howell W. "Pete" Miller, chief engineer for the Granville Brothers and their famous Gee Bee racers, to create a racing aircraft to his own design. Hawks obtained sponsorship from the Gruen Watch Company and named the aircraft "Time Flies". The Hawks Miller HM-1 design featured streamlined lines including the unusual feature of "burying" the cockpit with a curved windshield contoured to fit the fuselage top extended in takeoff and landing but retracted in flight, with the pilot's seat lowered and the windshield flush with the fuselage. After its first flight on October 18, 1936, Hawks flew "Time Flies" on April 13, 1937, from Hartford, Connecticut to Miami, Florida, 4 hours and 55 minutes later. He then flew to Newark Airport, New Jersey, in 4 hours and 21 minutes but bounced on landing at Newark, and on the third bounce, a wooden spar had broken in the right wing, and others were also damaged. Short of funds, Hawks decided not to rebuild the aircraft which was sold to Tri-American Aviation where Miller rebuilt the aircraft as a two-seater, renamed the Miller HM-2, then the MAC-1 and Military Aircraft HM-1, to become a fast attack/observation aircraft. The aircraft was not successful in its new configuration, and after the sole example was destroyed in a crash, the project was abandoned.

== Popular culture ==
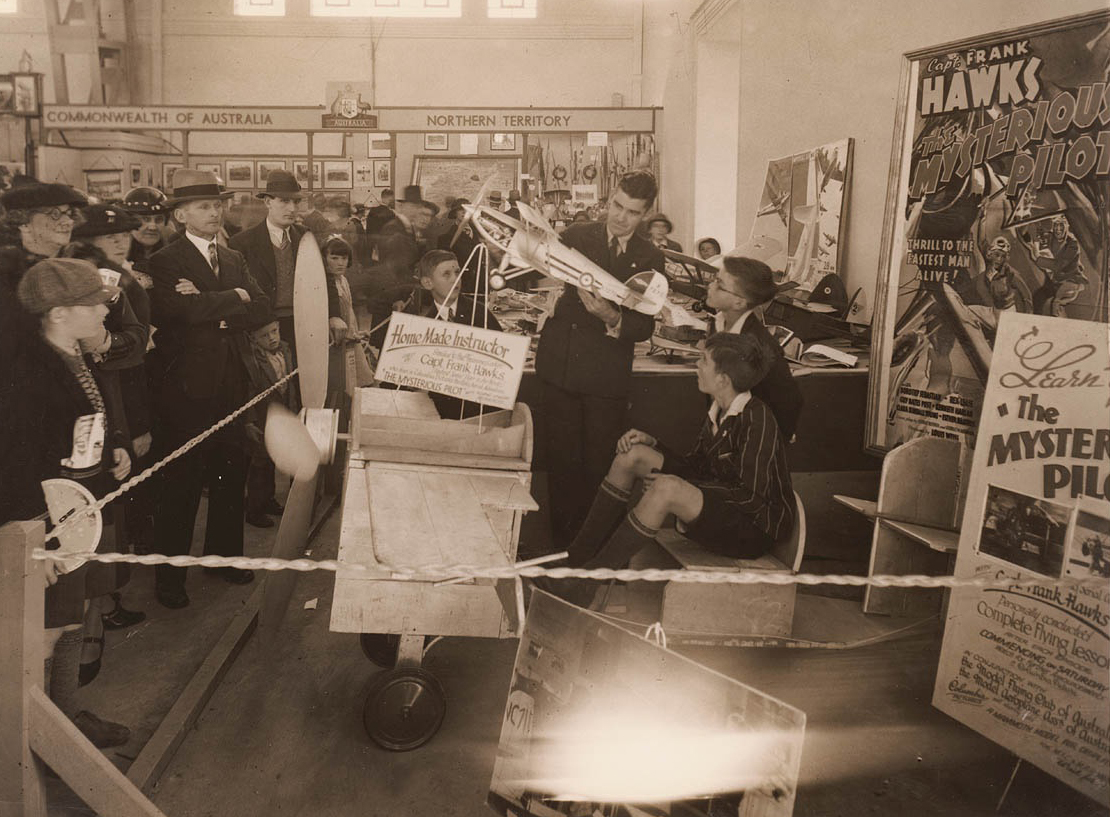
Pilot Frank Hawks talks on 'The Mysterious Pilot', Australia, 1937

Throughout his aviation career, Hawks was continually in the news, and was often linked with other famous aviators, including Jimmy Doolittle, Amelia Earhart, Charles Lindbergh and Eddie Rickenbacker, all of whom were personal friends. More than any other contemporary aviation figure, with the possible exception of Alexander P. de Seversky, Hawks exploited his image as an "ace" pilot with countless promotional ventures. Besides numerous advertisements that spotlighted the Hawks image (commonly billed above the title as "Captain Frank Hawks" but sometimes oddly called "Meteor Man"), he was a prominent spokesman for Post Cereals, featured in newspaper comic strips and children's adventure books. Through his "Air Hawks" and "Sky Patrol" fan clubs, Hawks was a favorite with young children.

Hawks was also active in many causes; he flew noted humorist Will Rogers in a fund-raising campaign for the Red Cross to assist Oklahoma drought victims in 1931. During his odyssey with Rogers, they became friends and when the humorist realized that Hawks had natural acting ability, enlisted the pilot into his folksy act. Hawks gradually became more active in entertainment ventures with his long-running radio serial ("Hawk's Trail"), a starring role in Klondike (1932), and becoming the leading actor in a film serial, The Mysterious Pilot (1937). A prolific writer, he wrote a second book, Once to Every Pilot in 1936, along with numerous articles for publication, always promoting aviation.

== Death ==
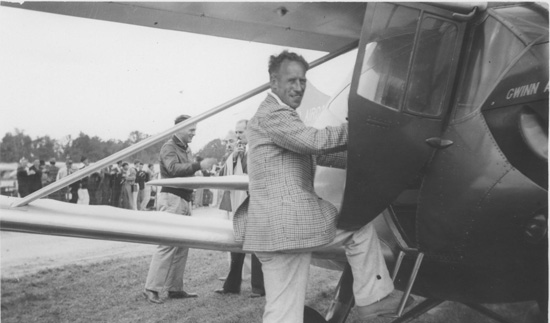
Frank Hawks with Gwinn Aircar

Hawks announced his retirement from air racing in 1937 and joined the Gwinn Aircar Company as vice president in charge of sales. He toured the United States, giving flying demonstrations in the new "safety" aircraft, the Gwinn Aircar. By 1938, Hawks was listed as Gwinn Aircar Company Vice-President and Production Manager.

Hawks, who had told friends years before, "I expect to die in an airplane," died in 1938 flying a Gwinn Aircar which crashed in East Aurora, New York. Time magazine reported on September 5, 1938:

Last week, Frank Hawks shuttled to East Aurora, N. Y. to show off his polliwog to a prospect, Sportsman J. Hazard Campbell. He landed neatly on the polo field in a nearby estate at about 5 p.m., climbed out, chatted awhile with Prospect Campbell and a cluster of friends. Presently he and Campbell took off smartly, cleared a fence, went atilt between two tall trees, and passed from sight. Then there was a rending crash, a smear of flame, silence. Half a mile the fearful group raced from the polo field. From the crackling wreck they pulled Frank Hawks; from beneath a burning wing, Prospect Campbell — both fatally hurt. The ship that could not stub its toe aground had tripped on overhead telephone wires.

An article and plans for modeling the Gwinn Aircar in which Hawks died was published in the November 1938 issue of Flying Aces magazine as a tribute to Hawks.

== Legacy ==
The Frank M. Hawks Memorial Award bestowed from the American Legion Air Service Post 501 of New York City recognized significant achievement in aviation. Juan Trippe and William (Bill) Powell Lear have been past recipients.

== See also ==
- Howard Hughes
- Charles Lindbergh
- National Air Race
- Northrop Gamma
- Roscoe Turner
- The Mysterious Pilot
