= The Mysterious Pilot =

1937 film by Spencer Gordon Bennet

- Chapter One poster (Note: The Howl of the Wolf is featured)
- Directed by: Spencer Gordon Bennet
- Written by: George M. Merrick; George Rosener (screenplay); The Silver Hawk by William Byron Mowery
- Produced by: Louis Weiss
- Starring: Frank Hawks
- Cinematography: Edward Linden; Herman Schopp B&W
- Edited by: Earl Turner (film editor)
- Music by: Abe Meyer (musical director/uncredited)
- Production company: Columbia Pictures
- Distributed by: Columbia Pictures
- Release date: December 9, 1937
- Running time: 15 chapters (300 min)
- Country: United States
- Language: English

The Mysterious Pilot is a 15-episode 1937 Columbia movie serial based on the book by William Byron Mowery and starring the record-breaking aviator Frank Hawks. (Note: Frank Hawks had gained fame through public appearances, record-breaking aviation events and tireless promotion of his "brand".) This was the second serial produced by Columbia. In the serial, Hawks plays a flying "mountie".

== Plot ==
Carter Snowden (Kenneth Harlan) about to marry Jean McNain (Dorothy Sebastian), is accused of murder. When his accuser is killed, Jean flees the train she is on, and heads into the Canadian woods. Snowden sends a bodyguard to find Jean, who appeals to RCMP Captain Jim Dorn (Frank Hawks) for help. With his friend "Kansas" (Rex Lease) and Indian Luke (Yakima Canutt), Jim hides Jean.

Snowden tracks down Jean and tries to lure her to his aircraft by telling her that Jim is injured and needs her. As soon as they realize what has happened, Jim and Kansas take to the air and force Snowden's aircraft down. Jean is unhurt but Snowden dies in the crash. Trying to get down to Jean, Jim's parachute gets tangled in the trees and Jean ends up rescuing him.

== Chapter titles ==
1. The Howl of the Wolf
2. The Web Tangles
3. Enemies of the Air
4. In the Hands of the Law
5. The Crack-up
6. The Dark Hour
7. Wings of Destiny
8. Battle in the Sky
9. The Great Flight
10. Whirlpool of Death
11. The Haunted Mill
12. The Lost Trail
13. The Net Tightens
14. Vengeance Rides the Airways
15. Retribution

_{Source:}

== Cast ==
- Frank Hawks as Captain Jim Dorn
- Dorothy Sebastian as Jean McNain
- Esther Ralston as Vivian McNain
- Rex Lease as RCAF Sergeant "Kansas" Eby
- Guy Bates Post as "Papa" Bergelot
- Kenneth Harlan as Carter Snowden
- Yakima Canutt as Indian Luke
- George Rosener as Fritz
- Clara Kimball Young as Martha, Fritz's Wife
- Frank Lackteen as Yoroslaff, a henchman
- Harry Harvey as "Soft Shoe" Cardigan, a henchman
- Tom London as Kilgour, a henchman
- Bob Walker as Boyer, a lumberjack henchman
- Ted Adams as Carlson, a henchman

== Production ==
Mysterious Pilot was adapted from the novel "The Silver Hawk" by William Byron Mowery. Frank Hawks was billed in Mysterious Pilot as the "Fastest airman in the world." After each episode, Hawks appeared to deliver a "flying lesson". A Sikorsky S-39 amphibian was featured in the serial.
