= Hawks Miller HM-1 =

American racing aircraft

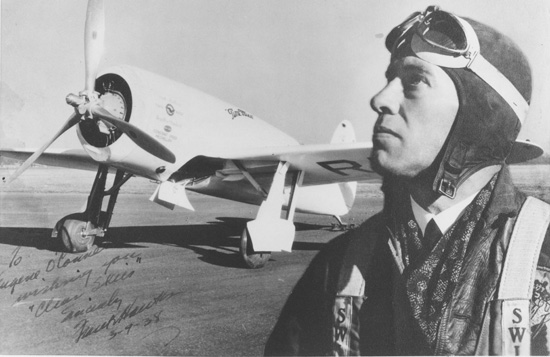

General information
- Type: Racing aircraft
- Manufacturer: Miller
- Designer: Howell W. "Pete" Miller
- Number built: 1

History
- First flight: October 18, 1936
- Developed into: Military Aircraft HM-1

The Hawks Miller HM-1, named Time Flies was an American racing aircraft that was the joint project of pilot-owner, Frank Hawks and Howell W. "Pete" Miller, chief engineer for the Granville Brothers. Although very advanced for its time with an enclosed cockpit that highlighted its streamlined lines, development ended after a crash during testing. A completely new design emerged when the aircraft was re-configured as a two-seat military aircraft.

== Design and development ==
In 1936, Hawks approached "Pete" Miller, the Granville Brothers chief engineer responsible for their famous Gee Bee racers, to create a racing aircraft from his own design, the Hawks Miller HM-1. Miller formed the New England Aircraft Company, with himself as president and Hawks as vice president. Hawks obtained sponsorship from the Gruen Watch Company and named the aircraft "Time Flies". The Hawks Miller HM-1 design featured a streamlined shape, including the unusual feature of "burying" the cockpit with a curved windshield contoured to fit the fuselage top, that was extended for takeoff and landing, but retracted in flight, with the pilot's seat lowered and the windshield flush with the fuselage.

Construction of the fuselage consisted of chrome-molybdenum steel tubing, covered with Haskelite plywood. The cantilever wing was also plywood-covered and had three spruce spars boxed with plywood and had plywood ribs and maple corner blocks. The interior structure of the fin was steel tubing with plywood ribs with the stabilizer, rudder and elevators having spruce spars, maple corner blocks and plywood ribs. The faired rudder was equipped with a trim tab operated from the cockpit; elevators and ailerons also had trim tabs. A 230 U.S. gallons (870 L; 190 imp gal) fuel tank was carried forward of the cabin and just aft of the engine behind a metal firewall was a 25 U.S. gallons (95 L; 21 imp gal) oil tank.

To achieve high performance, the manually retractable landing gear was of the individual leg type equipped with Goodrich tires, Hayes hydraulic brakes and Aerol landing gear struts; Grimes landing lights were also retractable. The fully retractable gear had the wheels retracting into wells in the underside of the wing and fuselage belly which was reinforced to survive an emergency with the wheels up. The streamlined tail skid was aluminum in its upper part and at the bottom made of Stellite, a substance for protecting metals subjected to excessive wear. A small wheel within the streamlined form, protruded sufficiently so that the wheel carried the load when landing on asphalt or concrete runways. On softer fields, the lower part of the skid absorbed the landing shock.

== Operational history ==
After its first flight on October 18, 1936, Hawks flew "Time Flies", from Hartford, Connecticut, to Miami, Florida, on April 13, 1937, in 4 hours and 55 minutes. He then flew to Newark Airport, New Jersey, in 4 hours and 21 minutes but bounced on landing at Newark, and after the third bounce, a wooden spar broke in the right wing with other spars also damaged. Short of funds, Hawks decided not to rebuild the aircraft and sold the rights to the design, including engineering data to Tri-American Aviation, a concern that wanted to convert the design into a fast attack/observation aircraft.

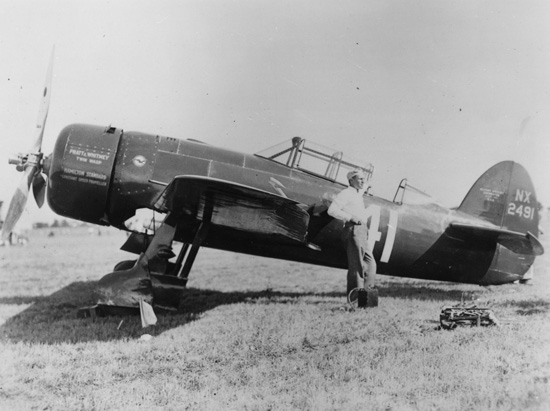
Military Aircraft HM-1 at the 1938 Thompson Trophy race

The principals of Tri-American Aviation, Leigh Wade and Edward Connerton, engaged Miller to rebuild the aircraft in 1938 as a two-seater with a greenhouse canopy added. The aircraft was renamed the Miller HM-2, but also when company was reorganized as the Miller Aircraft Co., it was called the MAC-1, the "Hawks Military Racer" and Military Aircraft HM-1. With the intention to demonstrate the aircraft's potential, pilot Leigh Wade entered the MAC-1 in the 1938 Thompson Trophy race. In essentially military configuration with dummy machine guns fitted, Wade flew the aircraft to a fourth-place finish.

After the Thompson race, Earl Ortman flew the MAC-1/HM-1 at East Hartford, Connecticut to display flight capabilities for foreign military interests, and seek out military contracts. (Note: Tri-American had interests in South America, the likely place to sell the MC-1.) While reaching speeds approaching 425 mph (684 km/h), a wing sheared off. Ortman was able to bale out safely, but the aircraft was demolished and the project was abandoned.

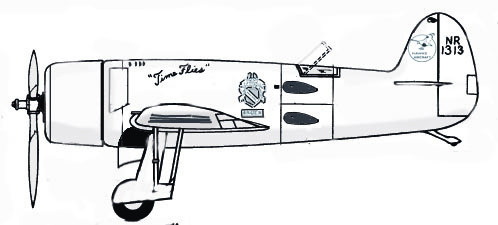
Hawks Miller HM-1

== Specifications (Hawks Miller HM-1) ==
General characteristics

- Crew: 1
- Length: 23 ft 6 in (7.16 m)
- Wingspan: 31 ft 0 in (9.14 m)
- Wing area: 160 sq ft (48.77 m^{2})
- Empty weight: 1,840 lb (834 kg)
- Gross weight: 4,028 lb (1,827 kg)
- Powerplant: 1 × Pratt & Whitney Twin Wasp Air Cooled 9 cylinder radial, 1,150 hp (860 kW)

Performance

- Maximum speed: 375 mph (604 km/h, 326 kn)
