= Union Aircraft Company =

American aircraft manufacturer

- Company type: Aircraft Manufacturer
- Founded: 1937
- Headquarters: Santa Monica, California, Glendale, California
- Key people: Keith Rider, CS Story, WK Gawley
- Parent: Story-Gawley Propeller Company

Union Aircraft Company was an American aircraft manufacturer specializing in race aircraft.

California based aircraft designer Keith Rider had developed aircraft since 1916, and specialty aircraft for the National Air Races in the early 1930s. Starting his career as a draftsman for the Glen L. Martin Company. His five early racing designs built in a casket factory were state of the art monoplanes of the era. Despite large payoffs in the height of the depression, Rider fell into debt with the Story-Gawley Propeller company. He founded the Union Aircraft Company as a subsidiary of Story-Gawley to produce an aircraft that would provide enough winnings to pay off the debts, and seek future profits. The company produced the Rider R-6 "Eight-Ball".

The profits did not come about, leading to the end of aircraft production. In 1941 the parent company Story-Gawley was absorbed by Industrial Forming. Rider went on to become Vice President of Doak Aircraft, and project engineer for the Timm Aircraft Company.

== Aircraft ==
Summary of aircraft built by Union Aircraft Company
Model name	First flight	Number built	Type
Rider R-6	1938	1	Racing aircraft
