= Klondike (1932 film) =

1932 film

- Thelma Todd and Lyle Talbot in film
- Directed by: Phil Rosen
- Written by: Tristram Tupper (story, adaptation, dialogue)
- Produced by: William T. Lackey
- Cinematography: James S. Brown Jr. Archie Stout
- Edited by: Carl Pierson
- Distributed by: Monogram Pictures
- Release date: August 30, 1932
- Running time: 68 minutes
- Country: United States
- Language: English

Klondike is a 1932 American pre-Code film directed by Phil Rosen about a man who is put on trial for manslaughter after a surgery on a patient's brain goes awry. The film is also known as The Doctor's Sacrifice in the United Kingdom. It was silent film star Priscilla Dean's final film.

== Plot ==
Doctor Robert Cromwell (played by Lyle Talbot) is charged with murder when a patient dies after an experimental operation to remove a brain tumor.

His pilot friend, Donald Evans (Frank Hawks), convinces "Doc" to join him on a trans-Pacific trip as a means to start a new life. They plot a flight path across the Bering Strait, but rough weather blows them off course and they end up in Alaska.

There the doctor is faced with a new dilemma. Mark Armstrong (Henry B. Walthall) begs the doctor to attempt the operation on his son Jim (Jason Robards Sr.) who is crippled by a similar brain tumor. When the doctor refuses, Mark accuses him of wanting his son to die, because he is in love with Jim's fiancée, Klondike (Thelma Todd).

"Doc" acquiesces, at Klondike's insistence. Although having none of the facilities of a hospital, he believes that the operation is less likely to succeed, the longer it is delayed.

The operation seems to be a partial success. But now Jim will do anything to keep "Doc" from taking Klondike back to the States with him, even using his genius with electricity to electrocute him.

== Cast ==
- Thelma Todd as Klondike
- Lyle Talbot as Dr. Robert Cromwell
- Henry B. Walthall as Mark Armstrong
- Jason Robards Sr. as Jim Armstrong
- Priscilla Dean as Miss Porter
- Tully Marshall as Editor Hinman
- Patrick H. O'Malley, Jr. as Burke
- Myrtle Stedman as Miss Fielding
- Ethel Wales as Sadie Jones
- George 'Gabby' Hayes as Tom Ross
- Frank Hawks as Donald Evans

== Production ==
The film was remade in 1942 as Klondike Fury.
