= Rider R-6 =

R-6 "Eight Ball"
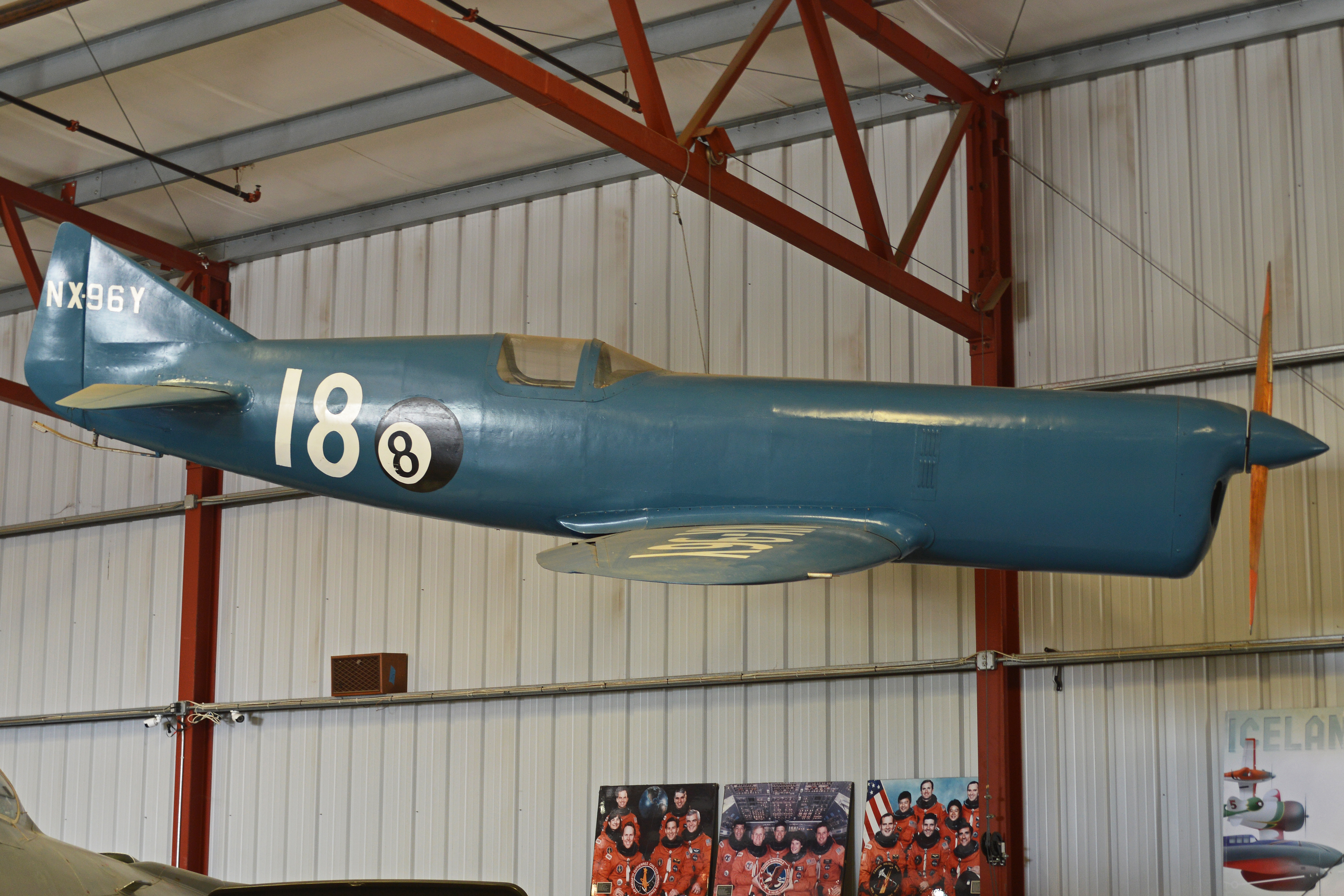

General information
- Type: Racing aircraft
- National origin: United States
- Manufacturer: Union Aircraft Company
- Designer: Keith Rider
- Number built: 1

History
- Introduction date: 1938

The Rider R-6 was the last of the Keith Rider designed racing aircraft of the 1930s.

== Development ==
The R-6 eightball had smooth plywood skins painted light blue with a large eight ball on each side. The actual racing number for the aircraft was 18. It was the last of the Rider racers, as well as the first and last of Rider's new company Union Aircraft Company before World War II intervened, stopping the National Air Races.

== Design ==
The R-6 is a single-place, all-wood low-wing monoplane with retractable landing gear. The first wing used was a long, thin wing about 20 ft long with hydraulic landing gear. For the 1939 races, a new wing was installed that was nearly elliptical in shape and a lightweight worm-gear manually retractable mechanism replaced the hydraulics.

== Operational history ==
- 1938 Louis W. Greve Trophy Race - The Eight Ball competed against two other Rider designs, the "Firecracker" and the "Jackrabbit". Pilot Joe Jacobson placed third with a speed of 218.478 mph.
- 1938 Thompson Trophy The Eight Ball dropped out in the 27th lap.
- 1939 National Air Races. Pilot George Byers dropped out after a lean mixture burned through a cylinder on tryouts.

== On display ==
The Eight Ball was restored and is on display at the Planes of Fame museum in Chino, California, along with the R-4 Firecracker. In 1991, the R-6 was displayed at the EAA Airshow in Oshkosh, Wisconsin as part of a "Golden Age of Air Racing" program.

== Specifications (Rider R-6) ==
Data from Sport Aviation

General characteristics

- Crew: 1
- Length: 19 ft (5.8 m)
- Wingspan: 18 ft 5 in (5.61 m)
- Powerplant: 1 × Menasco Buccaneer
- Propellers: 2-bladed Hamilton Standard adjustable

Performance

- Maximum speed: 189.852 kn (218.478 mph, 351.606 km/h)
