= Earl Ortman =

20th-century American aviator

- Born: January 10, 1912; Fort Gibson, Oklahoma, U.S.
- Died: February 27, 1953 (aged 41); Miami, Florida, U.S.
- Known for: Thompson Trophy perennial second-placer, called "the man to beat"
- Spouse: Maryette (nee Ritcher) Ortman (m. 1941)
- Aviation career
- Famous flights: 1936-1939 National Air Races

Racing career
- First race: 1932 Omaha Air Meet
- Best position: 1938 Golden Gate Classic
- Aircraft: Marcoux-Bromberg Special

Earl Hill Ortman (January 10, 1912 – February 27, 1953) was an American aviator who was recognized as one of the top competitive air racers during the Golden Age of Aviation in the 1930s and 1940s. His first of many achievements began with a record-setting flight from Canada to Mexico in 1935 and culminated in the Golden Gate Classic air race from Oakland, California to San Diego, California, winning it in 1938. The media touted him as a rival of fellow airman Roscoe Turner. Called "the man to beat," he was three-time runner-up of the Thompson Trophy air race from 1936 until 1938 and third in 1939—losing to Turner twice, and the Bendix Transcontinental Race in 1937, also as runner-up. He was closely associated with the airplane he flew, the Marcoux-Bromberg Special, and was the only person to pilot it between 1936 and 1939. He stepped away from racing following his fourth Thompson attempt in 1939 and became a commercial airline pilot for Canadian Colonial Airways until 1940. He ferried American military aircraft from Montreal to Scotland from 1940 to 1941 for the Air Transport Auxiliary (ATA), and was test pilot for Douglas and Lockheed. He resumed racing in 1946 but was unsuccessful in repeating his earlier achievements from the previous decade. As a heavy smoker, he passed away in Miami, Florida from a heart attack in 1953.

== Early life ==
Earl Hill Ortman was born in Fort Gibson, Oklahoma, on 10 January 1912 to attorney Earl H. Ortman and Nellie Ortman, but was the subject of a publicized custody battle when they divorced in 1914. Mrs. Ortman claimed the child was kidnapped and taken to Ohio while she was working in Kansas. Mr. Ortman sent his son to live with his parents, Benson and Mary Ellen 'Ella' Ortman of Columbus, Ohio. In September 1914, Earl's father died in a drowning accident in the Grand River in Fort Gibson, Oklahoma, and the mother filed suit to regain custody of her son. At age seven the court decreed that Earl Jr. remain with his grandparents. His grandmother and he relocated to Pleasantville, Ohio, where young Earl graduated Class of 1930 at Pleasantville High School.

== Aviation career ==
Ortman received flight school training at the Hancock Foundation College of Aeronautics in Santa Maria, California, earning his diploma in May 1931.

=== Air racing ===
Earl Ortman (right) and Roscoe Turner in 1935 with the Rider R-3 (which became the Marcoux-Bromberg Special in 1936)

Ortman's plane, the Marcoux-Bromberg Special (middle aircraft) at the 1938 Thompson Trophy air race with the Laird-Turner Meteor LTR-14 piloted by Roscoe Turner (right)

His career in air racing began in 1932, at age 20, with the Brown Racer, a small monoplane designed by aeronautical engineer Keith Rider. Named Miss San Francisco II, he flew it at the Omaha Air Meet on May 30, taking second place. His association with Keith Rider continued by piloting the Rider-designed R-2 in 1934 and R-3 (which a year later became the Marcoux-Bromberg Special) in 1935.

In July 1935 he flew the R-3 (pictured) from Canada to Mexico in under 5½ hours and an average speed of 242 mph (389 km/h), setting a record that stood for 2 years. For the 1935 Bendix Trophy, a larger engine was fitted shortly before the race. While being flown to Cleveland for the 1935 Thompson Trophy, mishaps and repairs rendered the aircraft unairworthy according to Thompson officials, so was returned to California.

Thompson Trophy

From 1936 to 1938, Ortman was the only aviator to pilot the Marcoux-Bromberg Special, his name described as "almost synonymous" with the aircraft. In it he vied for the Thompson Trophy from 1936 until 1939. His first entry in 1936 ended with a second-place against Michel Detroyat with an average race speed of 228 mph (367 km/h). The following year, he took the lead late in the race but failed to hold it at the last minute, repeating the previous year's performance with another second-place finish against winner Rudy Kling. At the 1938 Thompson Trophy race (pictured), news agencies cited Ortman against fellow airmen Roscoe Turner as top competitors for the prize. With a qualifying run of 280.03 mph (450.66 km/h) and average speed of 269.718 mph (434.069 km/h), he managed his third straight second-place finish against Turner's 283.419 mph (456.119 km/h) win. At his fourth and final showing in 1939 he finished third in a field of seven aircraft, again with Turner taking the win.

He also competed at the Bendix Transcontinental Race in 1937, where he took runner-up. At the closed-course Louis W. Greve Trophy Race in Cleveland the same year he clocked the fastest qualification of 263.023 mph (423.294 km/h). In 1938 he won the Golden Gate Classic air race from Oakland, California, to San Diego, California, clocking his fastest average speed of 273 mph (439 km/h).

Ortman found numerous employment opportunities as a pilot concurrent with his air racing. He co-participated with pilot Kenneth Hunter in the air endurance record attempt by Henrietta Sumner and Jean LaRene in 1934, performing aerial refueling of the aviatrixes' aircraft. He was employed as a private pilot for Hollywood actor Wallace Beery, appointed chief pilot and instructor for Speer Flying Service of San Diego, California, and doubled for Clark Gable in the 1938 film Test Pilot, working for six weeks flying the lead character's aircraft, but only appearing on screen for ten seconds. Based out of Tulsa, Oklahoma, he was employed at Douglas Aircraft and Spartan Aircraft Company, testing their Executive, as well as Lockheed.

He performed test flights on the Military Aircraft HM-1, a reworked Hawks Miller HM-1 air racer named Time Flies, at East Hartford, Connecticut to investigate its military potential. On October 3, 1938, during a high-speed power dive, stress on the wing caused it to separate from the aircraft, with Ortman bailing out safely when he instinctively pulled his parachute ripcord while being struck on the head, rendering him semi-conscious. He recovered in time to witness the aircraft strike the ground, destroying it. The incident qualified his induction into the Caterpillar Club, an informal association of people who have successfully used a parachute to bail out of a disabled aircraft.

In 1946, Ortman returned to air racing, competing for the Bendix Trophy in the P-38 Lightning, and the Thompson Trophy in a clipped-wing P-51 Mustang. He clocked his career-best average speed of 367.625 mph (591.635 km/h) in the Mustang, taking third against winner Alvin "Tex" Johnson, who averaged 373 mph (600 km/h) in a P-39 Aircobra. He was technical advisor for the Tulsa Mid-Nation Shows in 1947 that introduced a new class of Midget racers, and flew in the annual Miami Air Maneuvers for several years, including 1948 in the Loose Special, and 1950.

=== Post-racing ===
In September 1939, following his fourth Thompson Trophy attempt, Ortman stepped away from air racing. His reason was a promise he made to his fiancé, Montreal airline stewardess Maryette Ritcher, to whom he became engaged in March 1941. Based out of Montreal but residing also in Newark, New Jersey, he took a quick succession of various assignments that began with flying for Canadian Colonial Airways, serving routes between Canadian and American destinations in the North-East and Mid-West. Late in 1940 he signed on as a civilian ferry pilot with the Air Transport Auxiliary (ATA), transporting American military aircraft like the twin-engined Lockheed Hudson from Montreal to RAF bases in Scotland until 1941.

== Personal life ==
Ortman was a heavy smoker, and later an avid rum drinker after he quit. In his youth he was slightly built, mild-mannered and shy, becoming sardonic in his later years and observed as flying "like a man possessed." He counted among his friends numerous famous aviators such as H. H. "Hap" Arnold, Jimmy Doolittle, Wiley Post and Roscoe Turner, with whom his competitive rivalry "became legendary." His fame as a top air-race competitor made him a 1938 product spokesperson for Swift's ALLsweet margarine, offering children free model gliders of Boeing, Severksy, Douglas and Brewster aircraft when parents purchased their product.

On April 16, 1941, he married Maryette Ritcher in Montreal. He continued testing aircraft at Douglas in Tulsa, and while there suffered a heart attack in 1952, which grounded him. He and his wife moved to Miami for health reasons, but he suffered a second heart attack and died on February 27, 1953, at age 41. He was cremated.

== Sources ==
Newsprint

- "Widow Seeking to Regain Her Child". Muskogee Times-Democrat. Vol. XX, no. 303. December 10, 1914. p. 1 – via Newspapers.com. "Divorced Wife Of Earl H-Ortman, Fort Gibson Attorney Who Was Drowned In Grand River Last September, Wants Custody Of Three-Year-Old Boy Now Ward Of His Grandfather-Claims Child Was "Kidnaped""
- "11 Air Cadets Will Graduate". The Morning Press. Vol. LXVIII, no. 235. May 23, 1931. p. 18 – via Newspapers.com. "Those to receive diplomas of graduation are...Earl Ortman, Pleasantville, Ohio"
- "Speedplane Wins At Omaha Airmeet". Santa Maria Times. Vol. 15, no. 38. May 31, 1932. p. 6 – via Newspapers.com. "Earl Ortman, graduate of Hancock Foundation College of Aeronautics in the May 1931 class, flew the plane...Miss San Francisco II was designed and built by Keith Rider San Francisco aeronautical engineer."
- "Five Air Kings Poised To Hop In Bendix Race". Los Angeles Evening Citizen News. Vol. 20, no. 130. August 30, 1934. p. 11 – via Newspapers.com. "James E. Granger of Clover Field, Santa Monica, today was hurrying last minute preparations on his Keith-Rider ship"
- "Aviatrices Seek New Endurance Flight Mark". The Republican. Vol. 55, no. 164. December 8, 1934. p. 8 – via Newspapers.com. "being refueled by another plane operated by Kenneth Hunter and Earl Ortman"
- "Plane Speed Bid Planned". The Los Angeles Times. Vol. LIV. March 26, 1935. p. 26 – via Newspapers.com. "Keith Rider air racer owned by Mrs. Edith Boydston Clark, Santa Monica sportswoman"
- "Vance Breese Sets New Plane Record". The Edwardsville Intelligencer. Vol. 73, no. 118. May 18, 1935. p. 3 – via Newspapers.com. "new record of one hour, 11 minutes and 56 seconds for a San Francisco to Los Angeles flight."
- "Three Flag Record Set". The Los Angeles Times. Vol. LIV. July 4, 1935. p. 1 – via Newspapers.com. "Earl Ortman Flies From Vancouver to Mexico in Fast Time."
- Boyl, Jahn W. (September 6, 1937). "Kling Wins Greve Trophy Race in Close Finish". The Long Beach Sun. p. 1 – via Newspapers.com. "Earlier in the day, Earl Ortman, tow-headed Los Angeles flier, electrified the crowd"
- Keen, Harold (April 19, 1938). "Aerial Speed Demon Comes To San Diego". The San Diego Sun. Vol. 58, no. 109. p. 8 – via Newspapers.com. "Earl Ortman, Noted Speed Ace, Becomes Chief Pilot For Flying Service; Will Continue Racing"
- "Will It Be Ortman Versus Turner In Thompson Race?". The San Diego Sun. Vol. 58, no. 233. August 21, 1938. p. 22 – via Newspapers.com. "Unless some foreigner comes over here with a surprise job like Michel Detroyat brought from France a couple of years ago, it appears that the Thompson ought to be fought out by Roscoe Turner and me."
- "Seven Planes Qualify for Aerial Races". The Florida Times-Union. Vol. LXXIII. September 2, 1938. p. 1 – via Newspapers.com. "Speeds in Preliminary Tests Range from 214 to 280 Miles."
- "Free! of Extra Charge Air Racer Earl Ortman's Gliding Model Planes". Corpus Christi Times. Vol. 29, no. 63. September 30, 1938. p. 18 – via Newspapers.com. "Boys! Girls! You're in luck. You can get one of my swell model planes with each package of ALLsweet Margarine."
- "Earl Ortman 'Caterpiller' and Plane Mass of Junk". The Record. Vol. 44, no. 154. October 4, 1938. p. 2 – via Newspapers.com. "Ortman was testing the plane for the Military Aircraft Corporation, Springfield, Mass. "Time Flies""
- "Earl Orfman Member Of 'Caterpillar Club'". Riverside Daily Press. Vol. LIII, no. 236. October 4, 1938. p. 14 – via Newspapers.com. "Earl Ortman... was a member of aviation's "Caterpillar club" today, and his plane, "Time Flies," a mass of junk."
- "Turner Col. Roscoe Wins Trophy Race". The State Journal-Register. Vol. 108. September 6, 1939. p. 12 – via Newspapers.com. "Earl Ortman, Montreal, in a Marcoux-Bromberg special, took third"
- Cole, Percy T. (March 4, 1941). "Cloud Combing: Great "Name"—Pilots and Others Less Well Known Gather at Montreal as "Ferry" Pilots—Trans-Atlantic Romance". The Toronto Telegram. Vol. LXV, no. 269. p. 5 – via Newspapers.com. "For the past several months, Earl Ortman, mentioned previously, has been in Britain ferrying various kinds of aircraft from factories to Royal Air Force fields."
- "Engagements Announced". The Montreal Star. Vol. LXXIII, no. 69. March 22, 1941. p. 21 – via Newspapers.com. "Mr. and Mrs. Georges Richer, of Westmount, announce the engagement of their daughter, Maryette, to Mr. Earl Hill Ortman, of Los Angeles and New York"
- "Ortman—Richter". The Montreal Star. Vol. LXXIII, no. 90. April 16, 1941. p. 5 – via Newspapers.com. "Maryette, daughter of Mr. and Mrs. George Richer, of Westmount. to Mr. Earl Hill Ortman, of New York and Los Angeles"
- "U. S. Sky Troop Arm Surpasses That of Germany". The Decatur Daily Review. November 9, 1941. p. 16 – via Newspapers.com. "Remember the pilot whose duels with Roscoe Turner at air races all over the country.... Earl quit racing to become a pilot for Canadian Colonial Airways"
- "Indian Sign on Air Race Luck Pondered by 'Man to Beat'". The Plain Dealer. Vol. 105, no. 233. August 11, 1946. p. 13 – via Newspapers.com. "having a reputation as "the man to beat" hung on him in pre-war National Air Races because of the many times he came in second"
- "373 MPH Test Pilot's In Race Is New Mark". The Times. Vol. LXXIV, no. 95. September 3, 1946. p. 1 – via Newspapers.com. "Earl Ortman, veteran racing pilot from Tulsa, flying a P-51 Mustang. His average speed was 367.625 mph and third place"
- "Piloted, Midget Planes to Clash in Tulsa Speed Tests". The Tulsa Tribune. Vol. XLIII, no. 302. September 13, 1947. p. 2 – via Newspapers.com. "Earl Ortman, Tulsa test pilot and veteran air racer, has been named technical advisor for the Mid-Nation show"
- "Tulsan is 4th in Air Races". Tulsa World. Vol. 43, no. 121. January 12, 1948. p. 3 – via Newspapers.com. "Earl H. Ortman, of Tulsa, was fourth at 145.65 mph."
- "New Speed Record Set At Midget Air Races". Riverside Daily Press. Vol. LXV, no. 72. January 14, 1950. p. 2 – via Newspapers.com.
- "Death Takes Celebrated Flier, Pleasantville High Graduate". Lancaster Eagle-Gazette. Vol. 271. February 28, 1953. p. 1 – via Newspapers.com. "Earl H. Ortman, 41, a noted flier who won many honors in the National Air Races at Cleveland, and a former test pilot for Douglas and Lockheed aircraft companies, died here yesterday."
- "Earl H. Ortman, 41, Won Fame As Pilot". The Miami News. Vol. 57. February 28, 1953. p. 290 – via Newspapers.com. "Ortman first had heart trouble last year while working as a test pilot, and had not flown since. He had been testing planes for Douglas Aircraft at Tulsa, Okla."
- "Heart Attack Kills Speed Flier Ortman". The Miami Herald. Vol. 43. February 28, 1953. p. 88 – via Newspapers.com. "During his career, Ortman numbered among his close friends the great names in aviation-men like Gen. H. Н. "Hap" Arnold, Gen. James Doolittle, Wiley Post, Turner"
- "Noted U. S. Flier, 41, Dies At Miami Home". The Orlando Sentinel. Vol. LXIII, no. 289. February 28, 1953. p. 11 – via Newspapers.com. "Ortman became ill last year and moved to Miami for his health. He suffered a heart attack Oct. 24, and another yesterday."
- "Famed Test Flier Ortman Dies Suddenly In Miami". The Bradenton Herald. Vol. 31, no. 144. March 1, 1953. p. 29 – via Newspapers.com. "Orthman suffered a heart attack last Oct. 24 and another shortly before he died."
- Devlin, Roger V. (March 4, 1953). "Roger! Tulsans and Their Association With The Aviation World". The Tulsa Tribune. Vol. XLIX, no. 136. p. 9 – via Newspapers.com. "After he left Spartan he went back into racing again....or have someone finance a P-38 or P-39 or P-51."
- "Famed 'stubby racer' joins Bradley Air Museum elite". Connecticut Post. Vol. LXXXIX, no. 40. October 8, 1978. p. 131 – via Newspapers.com. "Pratt & Whitney Aircraft R-1535 Twin Wasp Junior...was used in the last version of the version of the R-3 racer."
- "Air museum to get distinguished racer". The Morning Union. Vol. 101, no. 23. February 18, 1979. p. 1 – via Newspapers.com. "The sleek airplane, was purchased by a Pratt & Whitney Aircraft Group grant to the Bradley Air Museum."
- Elliott, Jack (August 13, 1989). "Connecticut museum soars with spirit of flight". The Star-Ledger. Vol. 76, no. 166. p. 58 – via Newspapers.com. "The Marcoux-Bromberg Special (1934) which was featured in the movie, "Test Pilot," (1938) with Clark Gable"

Websites

- "Famous Record Breaking and Racing Pilots: Earl Ortman". Air Racing History. "Ortman was the only pilot this famous racer was to know throughout its long racing career."
- "Keith Rider R-3/Marcoux-Bromberg Special". Air Racing History. "The airplane was retired after the 1939 Thompson."
- "Earl Ortman". American Aviation Historical Society. "the perennial second-place finisher did it again in this updated Keith Rider R-3, now called the "Marcoux-Bromberg Special.""
- "The Keith Rider R-3/Marcoux-Bromberg Special". Airminded. "The Marcoux-Bromberg Special started life in 1933"
