= Gwinn Aircar =

Aircar
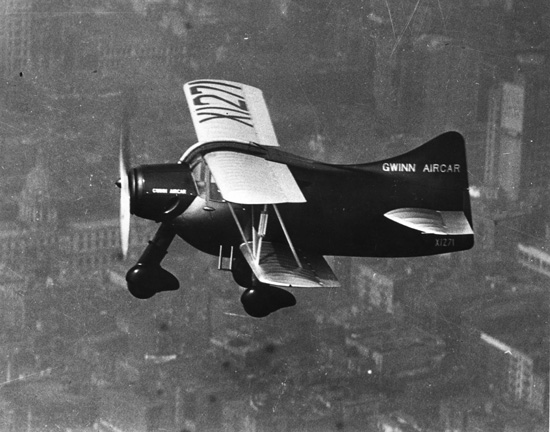
- Gwinn Aircar on a test flight

General information
- Type: Two-seat light aircraft
- National origin: U.S.
- Manufacturer: Gwinn Aircar Company, Inc.
- Designer: Joseph M. Gwinn, Jr.
- Number built: 2

History
- First flight: early 1937

The Gwinn Aircar was a single-engined biplane with a cabin for two, designed in the US as a safe and simple private aircraft. Lacking a rudder, it had several unusual control features as well as an early tricycle undercarriage. Development was abandoned after a crash in 1938.

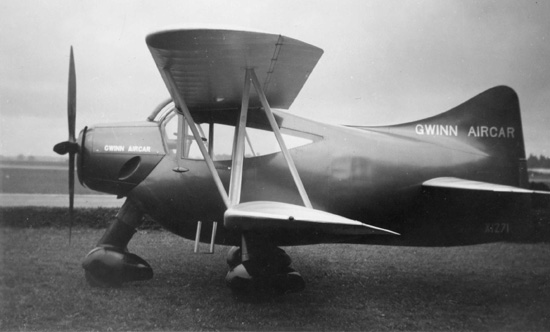
Gwinn Aircar on ground

== Design ==
The Gwinn Aircar was the only product of the aircraft manufacturing company set up by Joseph M. Gwinn Jr, who also designed it. He had previously worked with Consolidated Aircraft. The Aircar was intended as a safe, easy to fly aircraft that would neither stall nor spin. It used a simplified control system without a rudder. A fuselage which deepened rapidly behind a small radial engine and ended with a fin integrated into it, together with a tricycle undercarriage with a tall and faired front leg, gave the Aircar an unusual appearance.

The Aircar was a single bay biplane with parallel chord, unswept wings with strong stagger. The wings were built around two wooden spars, with metal ribs and edges but fabric covered; they were fixed to the upper and lower fuselage. The interplane struts were N-shaped, linking upper and lower spars, aided by one diagonal strut on each side running from the upper rear spar to the lower forward spar. Full span ailerons were fitted to both upper and lower wings.

The Aircar was initially fitted with a 95 hp (71 kW) Pobjoy Niagara II engine, a small diameter radial. The driveshaft of the two-bladed propeller was offset above the engine center by spur reduction gearing. An exhaust pipe led back over the cabin and the upper wing. The cabin windscreen was ahead of the wing leading edge but the glazing extended aft to beyond the trailing edge, pilot and passenger sitting side by side under it. Entry was by a pair of forward hinged, car type doors, one on either side. The all-metal, stressed skinned fuselage bulged rapidly behind the engine and was roughly circular in cross section between the wings. Seen from the side, the fuselage depth decreased only gently, but in plan it narrowed rapidly, ending in a vertical knife edge. The tailplane, mounted on the centerline, had a curved leading edge and carried elevators. The deflection range of these was limited to an overall 8.5°. The original fin had near straight leading edges both above and below the fuselage, terminating in a vertical, rudderless trailing edge carrying only a trim tab below the centerline.

The tricycle undercarriage, unusual at the time, had short main legs made possible by the combination of lower fuselage depth and hence lower wing position, together with the offset propeller. These legs were joined to the front wing spar close to the fuselage, cross braced and splayed outwards to increase the track. The front leg, mounted just behind the engine, was much longer; all three legs were faired and carried wheels enclosed in spats.

Control of the Aircar was also unusual. A column-mounted wheel moved the ailerons and fore and aft motion of the column operated the elevators as normal. Turns were made by banking. The trim tab on the fin compensated for propeller torque and was directly linked to the throttle. Instead of a rudder bar, a pedal operated the flaps used for takeoff and landing. The wheel brakes were also foot operated and the nosewheel was steered with the control column wheel. At takeoff, the flaps were initially retracted and the aircraft accelerated; at the appropriate speed the flaps were lowered and the Aircar left the ground. With elevators up this "zoom" was rapid but ended in level flight, whilst with them down the zoom was gentler and turned into a steady climb. Landings were made from a low speed approach with flaps extended; throttled back, the Aircar adopted a horizontal attitude, the elevator only controlling the sink rate.

== Development ==
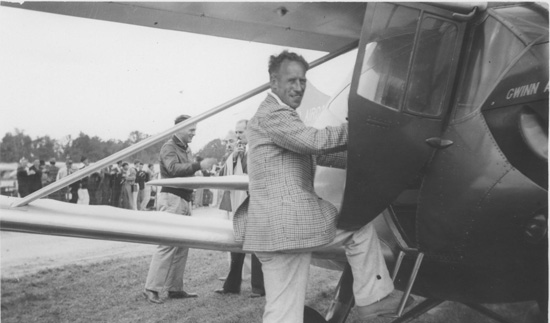
Frank Hawks with Gwinn Aircar

The first flight of the Aircar was in early 1937 and a second was built soon afterwards. Tests led to changes in the engine cowling, to experiments with a four-bladed propeller produced by mounting a pair of two-bladed ones at right angles on the same shaft, and to a serious revision of the fin. Its previously angular leading edge was replaced with a more curved and snub shape above the fuselage, though mostly retaining the vertical trailing edge. The line of lower fuselage was straightened so that the lower part of the fin was integrated into it.

These trials showed that with the 95 hp (71 kW) Niagara II engine the Aircar was underpowered, so the second aircraft was re-engined with the more powerful, but similar diameter, 130 hp (97 kW) Niagara V.

== Operational history ==
A sales tour followed: by 1938 the well known pilot Frank Hawks had been appointed Vice-President and Sales Manager of Gwinn Aircar Company Inc. and he and Nancy Love (née Harkness) flew the Aircar at a variety of meetings including the U.S. national Air Races at Cleveland in September 1937. Here it was reported as handling well both in the air and on the ground. In August 1938, Hawks and his passenger died on colliding with power cables shortly after takeoff. The surviving Aircar was donated to Consolidated Aircraft, Gwinn's old employers, where development continued.

== Convair 111 ==
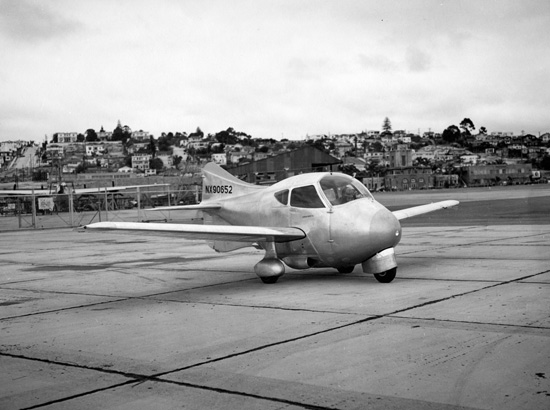
The Convair 111

After receipt of the Gwinn Aircar, Convair began development of the Model 111 Aircar in 1945, which closely resembled the Gwinn Aircar but had cantilever monoplane wings in place of the biplane layout of the Aircar and a pusher propeller driven by a mid-fuselage mounted 65 hp (48 kW) Continental A-65. Given the nickname "Pregnant Guppy", ground and wind-tunnel testing revealed low rudder control authority and poor directional stability, as well as problems with engine cooling. Convair persevered with the Aircar until it was deemed uneconomic to continue supplying engines and driveshafts to replace those damaged in testing. Once testing was halted the Aircar slipped into obscurity and was unceremoniously scrapped.

== Specifications (Niagara II engine) ==
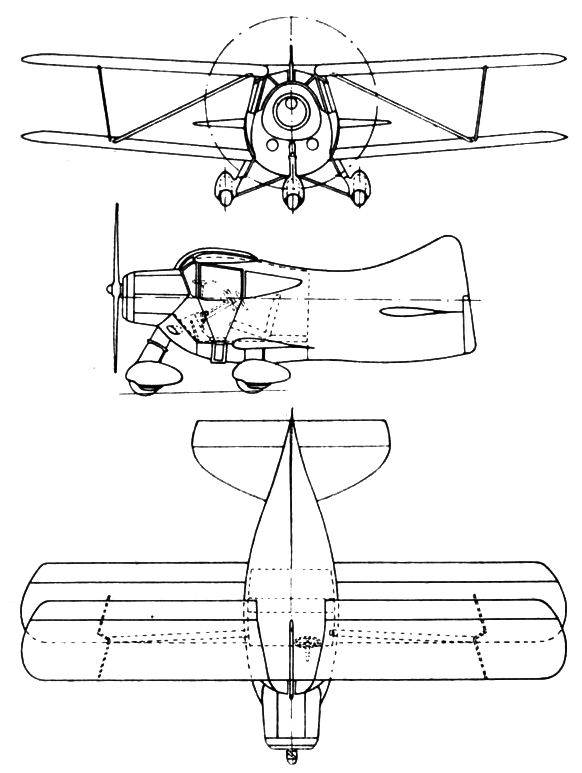
Gwinn AirCar 3-view drawing from L'Aerophile October 1937

Data from

General characteristics

- Capacity: 2
- Length: 16 ft 3 in (4.95 m)
- Wingspan: 24 ft 0 in (7.32 m)
- Wing area: 169 sq ft (51.51 m^{2})
- Empty weight: 1,099 lb (498.5 kg)
- Max takeoff weight: 3,377.48 lb (1,532 kg)
- Powerplant: 1 × Pobjoy Niagara II 7-cylinder air-cooled geared radial piston engine, 95 hp (71 kW) (original engine)
- Propellers: 2-bladed

Performance

- Maximum speed: 118 mph (189.9 km/h, 103 kn)
- Cruise speed: 103 mph (165.76 km/h, 90 kn)
- Range: 495 mi (796.62 km, 430 nmi)
