= Rider R-5 =

R-5
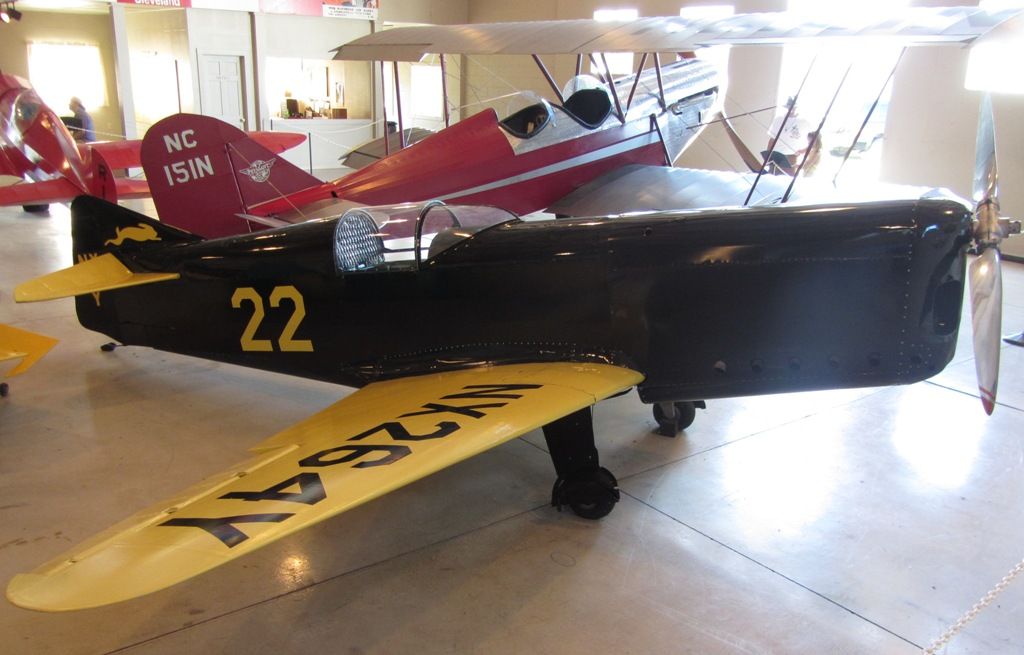
- R-5 on display at the EAA Aviation Museum

General information
- Type: Racing aircraft
- National origin: United States
- Designer: Keith Rider
- Number built: 1

The Rider-Elmendorf R-5 Jackrabbit is an aircraft designed and built to compete in the National Air Races.

== Development ==
Keith Rider developed the R-4 Firecracker and R-5 at the same time to compete in the 1936 racing season.

== Design ==
The R-5 is a low winged monoplane with retractable conventional landing gear. The wing is all wood with two spars and plywood covering. The fuselage is welded steel tubing with fabric covering. The tail surfaces are all-metal. The brakeless retractable main gear used a simple manual jackscrew. A tailskid was used rather than a tailwheel.

== Operational history ==
- 1936 National Air Races at Los Angeles - Pilot Dave Elmendorf placed third in the 580ci speed dash at 221.554 mph. The aircraft was painted yellow and named the "Elmendorf Special"

Douglas aircraft engineers Hal Marcoux and Jack Bromberg purchased the aircraft, painted it black and yellow, and renamed it the "Jackrabbit".

- 1938 National Air Races Greve trophy - Pilot Earl Ortman placed fourth with a speed of 192.503 mph.
- 1939 National Air Races - The aircraft was present, but did not compete due to engine issues. The National Air Races would be postponed afterward because of World War II. The R-5 was retired from racing.

The R-5 was purchased by James C. Garvin in 1966 later by Morton Lester for display at the EAA Aviation Museum in Oshkosh, Wisconsin.

== Variants ==
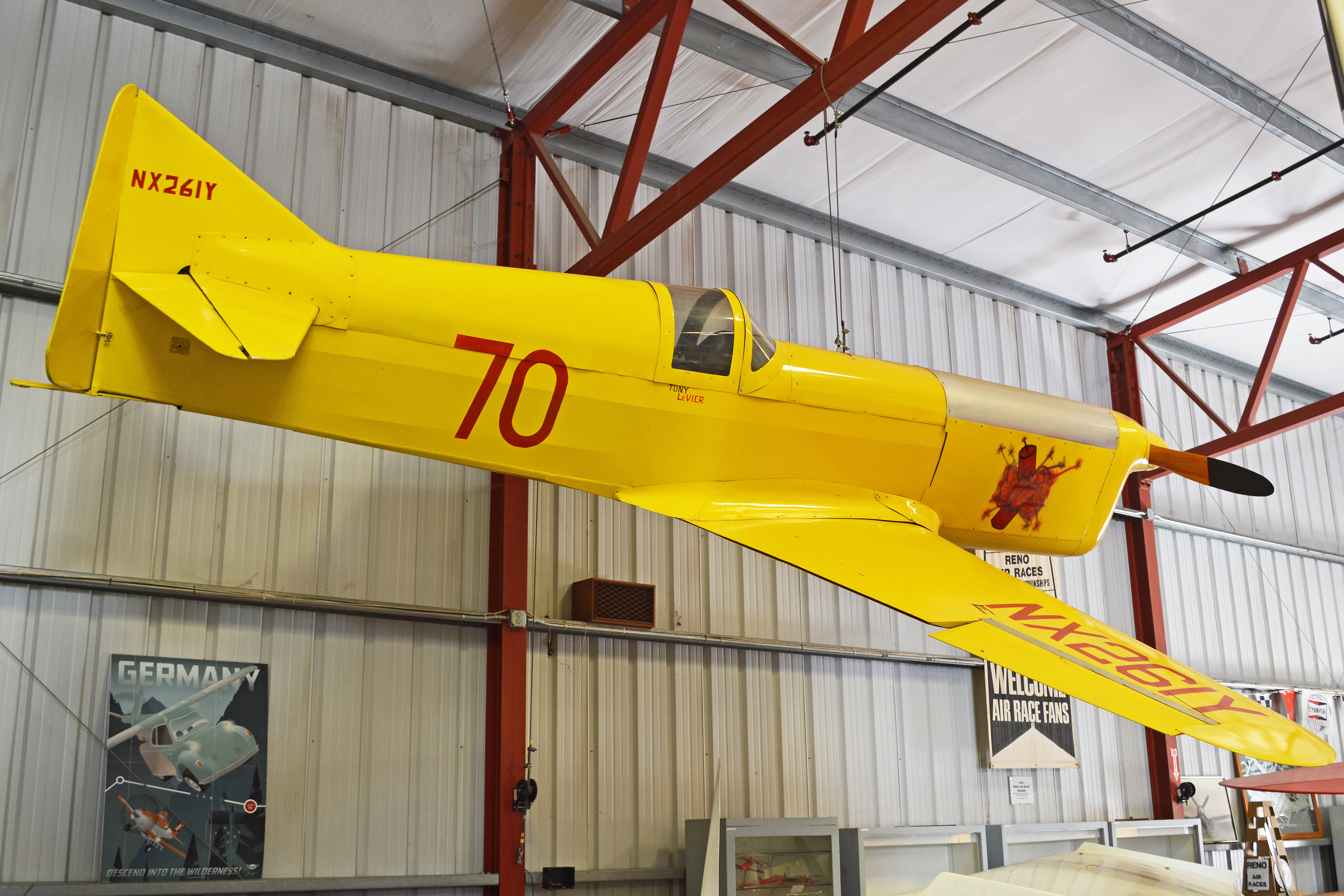
Rider R-4 ‘NX261Y - 70’ “Firecracker” Planes of Fame Museum, Chino, California, USA

- Rider R-4 A near twin design with two feet less wingspan than the R-5
- Rider R-5

== Specifications (R-5) ==
Data from Sport Aviation

General characteristics

- Crew: 1
- Length: 18 ft 6.25 in (5.6452 m)
- Wingspan: 20 ft .25 in (6.1024 m)
- Wing area: 60 sq ft (5.6 m^{2})
- Empty weight: 1,005 lb (456 kg)
- Gross weight: 1,325 lb (601 kg)
- Powerplant: 1 × Menasco C-654-544 6-cyl. air-cooled inverted in-line piston engine, 330 hp (250 kW)
- Propellers: 2-bladed ground adjustable

Performance

- Maximum speed: 195 kn (224 mph, 360 km/h)
