= Canadian Colonial Airways (Canada) =

Canadian airline (1928-1942)

Canadian Colonial Airways, Limited
- Founded: 1928
- Ceased operations: 30 June 1942
- Destinations: See Cities served below
- Parent company: Canadian Colonial Airways, Inc. (a United States airline)
- Headquarters: Montreal, Quebec, Canada

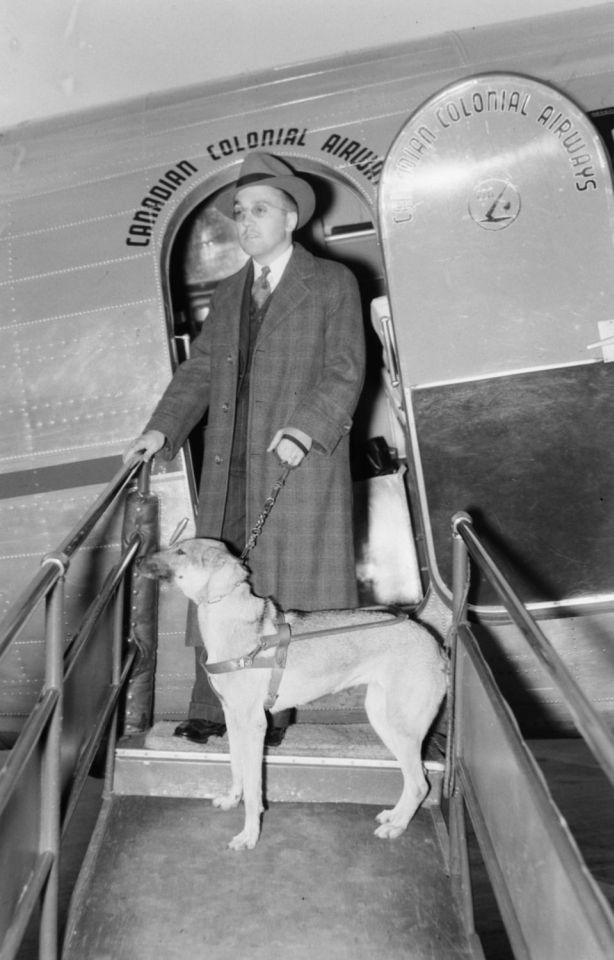
A man and dog on the staircase of a Canadian Colonial Airways airplane in 1941

Canadian Colonial Airways, Limited ("Limited") was a Canadian airline founded in 1928 in Montreal, Quebec, as a 100%-owned subsidiary of Canadian Colonial Airways, Inc. ("Incorporated"), a United States airline, notwithstanding the name. The two airlines operated joint service between New York City and Montreal.

On October 15, 1939, the American parent sold 51% of the Canadian subsidiary's stock to meet restrictions on the citizenship of owners of Canadian carriers and in March 1940, they reduced their ownership of the Canadian subsidiary further, to 24.5%.

Pursuant to the Civil Aeronautics Act of 1938, the Civil Aeronautics Authority (CAA) of the United States certificated Incorporated as a United States scheduled airline on January 9, 1940. Thereafter, the Civil Aeronautics Board (CAB), which succeeded the CAA in 1940, regulated Incorporated as a trunk carrier.

However, on August 13, 1941, the CAB rejected a permit for Limited to operate to the US as a foreign air carrier, because such permits were restricted to foreign airlines operating foreign-registered aircraft, and during the qualification period, Limited operated US-registered aircraft. The CAB directed Limited to stop flying in the United States and on June 30, 1942, Limited ceased operations.

On April 30, 1942, Incorporated changed its name to Colonial Airlines, Inc.

== Cities served ==
Surviving airline timetables for the 1928-1942 timeframe (some of which are marked as being the Canadian or American versions of the airline) show the following:

- Albany, New York
- Buffalo, New York
- Montreal, Quebec
- Newark, New Jersey
- Ottawa, Ontario
- Toronto, Ontario
- Troy, New York

== See also ==
- List of defunct airlines of Canada
