= Petit Special =

1940s American experimental aircraft

Special
- Front quarter view of the Petit Special

General information
- Type: Experimental aircraft
- National origin: American
- Manufacturer: George Petit
- Number built: 1

History
- Introduction date: 1948

The Petit Special was a high-speed experimental monoplane built by George Petit of Harvey, Illinois, and intended to compete for the 1948 Goodyear and Formula One air races.

== Design and development ==
The Special was a mid-wing single-engine pusher monoplane, designed by George Petit and constructed by him and a team of his employees. Petit anticipated his craft would have a top straight-line speed of 225 mph (362 km/h), approximately 30 mph (48 km/h) faster than its contemporaries.

The entire airframe was made from aluminum. The fuselage had a body of revolution profile, with a long pointed nose. The wings were of a constant chord, swept back by 17°, and were braced by thin metal rods both above and below. The pilot, positioned ahead of the wing, lay in a reclined position. A centrally located Continental C85 engine powered, via an extension-shaft, a two-bladed fixed-pitch propeller at the rear of the aircraft. The aircraft had a tailplane set at a 30° dihedral angle, and an inverted tailfin. It was equipped with a conventional fixed undercarriage.

The Special was given the race number 18, and the FAA Registry number N5715N. The airframe was not painted. The race number and registration number were done in blue paint, and the lettering by the cockpit being done in black.

== Operational history ==
In 1948, it appeared at the Continental Trophy Races in Detroit, but did not fly. According to an article in a 1949 newspaper, taxiing tests had been conducted, and the craft was to receive a plexiglass canopy. The Special does not appear to have been completed, and it is not known if the craft ever flew.

In 1970, it was found in storage in Dolton, Illinois. Members of the EAA restored it and arranged for its donation to the EAA Aviation Museum.

== Specifications (Special) ==
Data from The Eau Claire Leader, and Goodyear & Formula One Air Racing 1947-1967: Volume 1

General characteristics

- Crew: 1
- Length: 23 ft 11 in (7.29 m)
- Wingspan: 16 ft 8 in (5.08 m)
- Wing area: 50 sq ft (4.6 m^{2})
- Powerplant: 1 × Continental C85 flat-four, 85 hp (63 kW)
- Propellers: 2-bladed

Performance

- Maximum speed: 225 mph (362 km/h, 196 kn) estimated

== See also ==
Aircraft of comparable role, configuration, and era

- Allenbaugh Grey Ghost
- Lesher Nomad
- Lesher Teal
- PAR Special
