= Pritchard Rocket Air Ship =

American homebuilt wingless aircraft

Rocket Air Ship

General information
- Type: Homebuilt aircraft
- Manufacturer: Charles Pritchard
- Number built: 1

History
- Introduction date: 1955
- Retired: 1955

The Pritchard Rocket Air Ship was an experimental wingless homebuilt aircraft designed by Charles Pritchard of Emporia, Virginia. It was tested, without success, in 1955.

== Design and development ==
Pritchard, according to contemporary reports, was interested in developing an aircraft capable of "air travel and highway travel". He had previously built a model and studied it for a year before commencing the building of a full-sized craft. His design was a wingless aircraft, with an otherwise conventional configuration. The fuselage was a faceted streamlined body of revolution, with an octagonal cross-section. A number of 6 inch-wide lateral fins extended from the nose towards the tail. A large vertical fin was positioned immediately behind the propeller and above the fuselage. A small pair of anhedral wings, fitted with ailerons, were located near the bottom of the fuselage.

The aircraft was made entirely of aluminum, with riveted joins. Construction began in February 1955, and was completed by that June. Components from a damaged Cessna 120 were used in its construction, with that providing the engine, propeller, undercarriage, instrumentation, seating, and the empennage. Overall cost was stated to be $1,500, with the building taking "hundreds of hours."

The Rocket Air Ship shares many design features with a wingless free flight model aircraft called the Martian Space Ship, designed by Roy L. Clough, the details of which first appeared in the April 1954 issue of Air Trails magazine.

== Operational history ==
On June 10, 1955, the aircraft was taken by flatbed trailer to the airfield at Emporia, Virginia. With Pritchard at the controls, with the CAA supervising the trials, the aircraft made a series of taxiing runs along the runway. A vibration in the nose wheel temporarily halted the trials, but that issue was resolved and the trials then continued. After the final run (which, dependent on the account, was either the fourth or the eighth), the trials stopped, without the aircraft achieving flight.

== Specifications ==
Charles Pritchard in his Rocket Air Ship

Data from Railroader to Test Wingless Plane He Built for $1,500 and The "Rocket Air Ship"

General characteristics

- Crew: 1
- Length: 21 ft (6.4 m)
- Wingspan: 8 ft 2 in (2.49 m)
- Empty weight: 800 lb (363 kg)
- Powerplant: 1 × Continental C85 flat-four, 85 hp (63 kW)

Performance

== See also ==
- Sawyer Skyjacker II
- Wainfan Facetmobile
