= List of Louis Blériot medal winners =

Aviation award

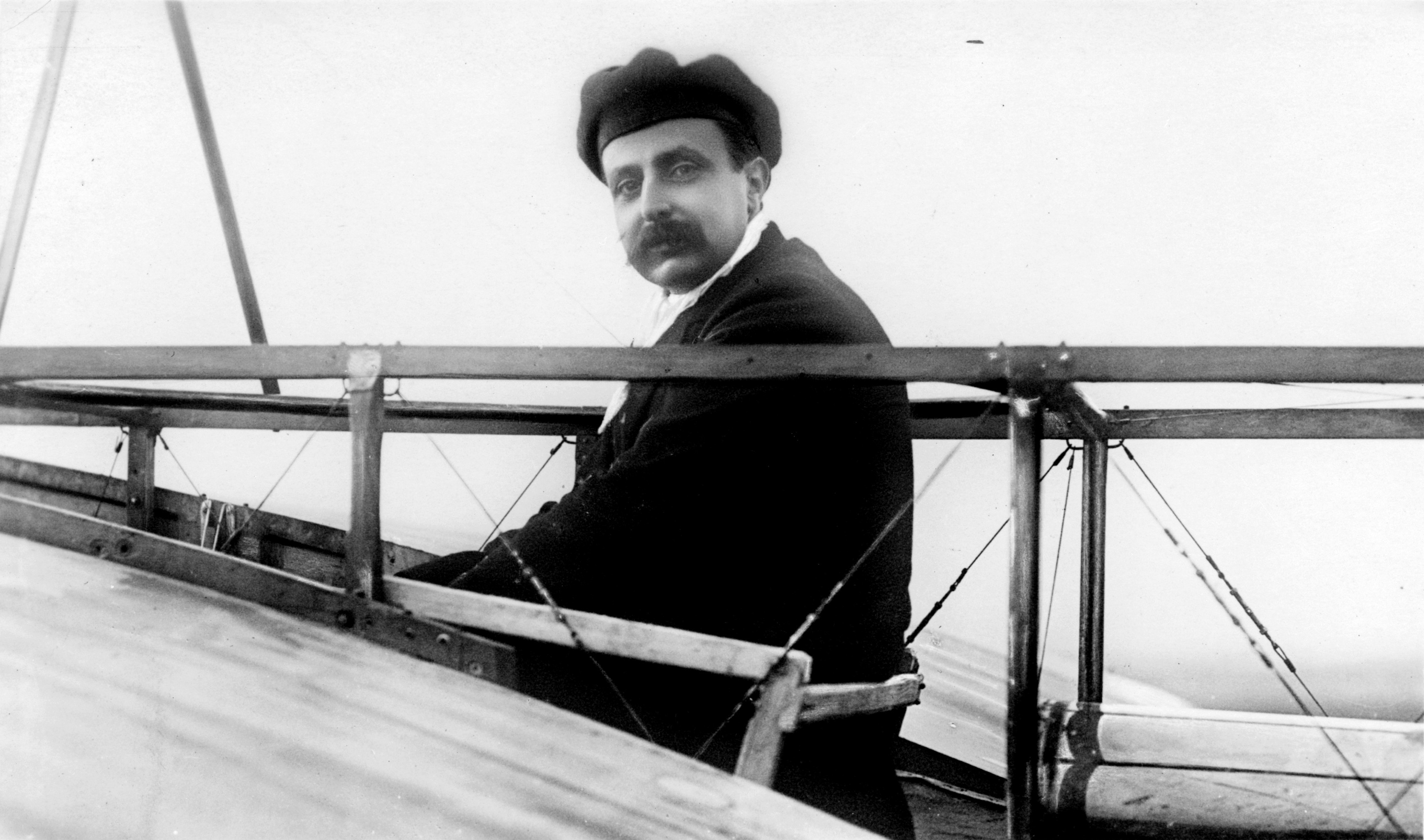
Louis Blériot in his monoplane

The Louis Blériot medal (English: /ˈblɛrioʊ/ BLERR-ee-oh, French: [bleʁjo]) is an aviation honor awarded by the Fédération Aéronautique Internationale (FAI), the international aviation record adjudicating body. The medal may be awarded up to three times every year to record setters in speed, altitude and distance categories in light aircraft. The award was established by 1936 in honor of Louis Blériot.

== Award recipients ==
- 2024 Miguel A. Iturmendi Copado
- 2023 Klaus Ohlmann
- 2022 Klaus Ohlmann
- 2021 not awarded
- 2020 not awarded
- 2019 not awarded
- 2018 Walter Extra
- 2017 Francis J. Roman
- 2016 Jon M. Sharp
- 2015 Klaus Ohlmann and Wesley E. Behel Jr
- 2014 William M. Yates
- 2013 not awarded
- 2012 not awarded
- 2011 not awarded
- 2010 Arnold Ebneter and Richard Young
- 2009 not awarded
- 2008 Jon M. Sharp and Stéphane Deregnaucour
- 2007 not awarded
- 2006 not awarded
- 2005 Dick Rutan, distance, XCOR EZ-Rocket
- 2004 Robert L. Gibson, speed over a closed course in a Cassutt IIM
- 2003 Bruce Bohannon
- 2003 Bruce Bohannon
- 2002 Bruce Bohannon
- 2001 Bruce Bohannon
- 2001 Richard C. Keyt
- 2000 Hans Georg Schmid
- 1999 Peter Scheichenberger
- 1998 Jon M. Sharp, Sharp Nemesis
- 1997 not awarded
- 1996 James A. Price
- 1996 Jon M. Sharp, Sharp Nemesis
- 1995 not awarded
- 1994 Dan E. Parisieu
- 1993 Jon M. Sharp, Sharp Nemesis
- 1992 Michael S. Arnold
- 1992 David W. Timms
- 1991 Peter Scheichenberger
- 1991 Robert L. Gibson, altitude in horizontal flight
- 1991 Peter Urach
- 1990 not awarded
- 1989 Eric Scott Winton
- 1989 Richard J. Gritter
- 1989 Kirk D. Hanna
- 1988 Wilhelm Lischak
- 1988 Yves Duval
- 1987 Norman E. Howell
- 1986 Wilhelm Lischak
- 1985 John E. Saum
- 1984 F. Gary Hertzler
- 1984 Richard Flohr
- 1983 Phillip C. Fogg
- 1982 A.J. Smith
- 1981 Dick Rutan
- 1980 Charles Andrews
- 1979 Gerald G. Mercer
- 1978 not awarded
- 1977 Oleg A. Boulyguine
- 1976 W.M. Pomeroy
- 1976 Rodney T. Nixon
- 1975 Edgar J. Lesher
- 1974 not awarded
- 1973 Edgar J. Lesher
- 1972 Roy Windover
- 1971 not awarded
- 1970 Edgar J. Lesher
- 1969 Hal Fishman
- 1969 Barry Schiff
- 1968 Donald C. Sinclair
- 1967 Edgar J. Lesher
- 1966 William C. Brodbeck
- 1966 Raymond Davy
- 1965 Geraldine "Jerrie" Mock
- 1964 Adriano Mantelli
- 1963 Raymond Davy
- 1962 Adriano Mantelli
- 1961 not awarded
- 1960 Raymond Davy
- 1959 not awarded
- 1958 not awarded
- 1957 Kaarl Henrik & Juhani Heinonen
- 1956 Richard V. Ohm
- 1956 L. Stastny
- 1956 F. Novak
- 1955 Peder Ib Riborg Andersen
- 1954 Iginio Guagnellini
- 1953 William D. Thompson
- 1953 Iginio Guagnellini
- 1952 Max Conrad
- 1951 Caro Bayley
- 1951 A. Rebillon
- 1950 John F. Mann
- 1950 R.R. Paine
- 1949 René Leduc
- 1949 William P. Odom
- 1949 Anna Bodriaguina
- 1948 not awarded
- 1947 not awarded
- 1946 not awarded
- 1945 not awarded
- 1944 not awarded
- 1943 not awarded
- 1942 not awarded
- 1940 not awarded
- 1939 not awarded
- 1938 André Japy
- 1938 Helmut Kalkstein
- 1938 Steve Wittman
- 1937 not awarded
- 1936 Stanisław Skarżyński
- 1936 Maurice Arnoux
- 1936 Furio Niclot Doglio
- 1936 Mrs. Becker (France)
