= Baker MB-1 Delta Kitten =

MB-1 Delta Kitten
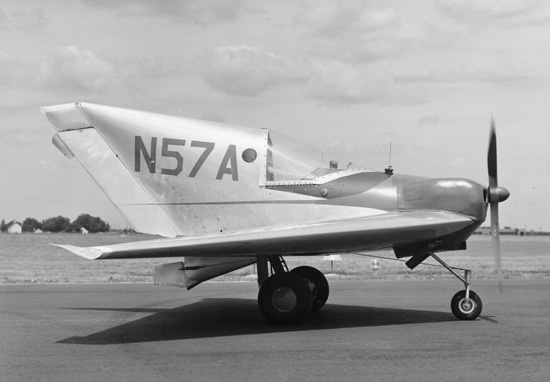

General information
- Type: Experimental aircraft
- National origin: United States
- Manufacturer: Baker Air Research
- Designer: Marion Baker
- Status: Destroyed

History
- First flight: 1960

The Baker MB-1 was a 45 degree delta winged experimental aircraft designed to maximize use of its 85 hp (63 kW) engine and experiment with delta-winged design.

== Design and development ==
The prototype was built around the remains of a wrecked Cessna 140 using its engine, propeller, and wheels. The landing gear was fashioned from truck springs. The controls were conventional with the elevator in the center of the delta's trailing edge and ailerons outboard operated by push-pull tubes. Plans for the aircraft were available for homebuilt construction.

== Operational history ==
The aircraft first flew in 1960. It was destroyed on July 29, 1976, when Baker was flying the Delta Kitten from Shelby, Ohio to Mansfield, Ohio. It was reported that the Delta Kitten sputtered, dipped, and crashed, killing Baker.

== Specifications ==
Data from Sport Aviation January 1962

General characteristics

- Crew: one
- Length: 13 ft 3 in (4.04 m)
- Wingspan: 18 ft (5.5 m)
- Height: 5 ft 8 in (1.73 m)
- Wing area: 98 sq ft (9.1 m^{2})
- Empty weight: 584 lb (265 kg)
- Max takeoff weight: 843 lb (382 kg)
- Powerplant: 1 × Continental C85 four-cylinder horizontally-opposed air-cooled engine, 85 hp (63 kW)
- Propellers: 2-bladed

Performance

- Maximum speed: 117 kn (135 mph, 217 km/h)
- Cruise speed: 100 kn (115 mph, 185 km/h)
- Service ceiling: 12,000 ft (3,700 m)

== See also ==
Aircraft of comparable role, configuration, and era

- Dyke Delta
- Löhr Delta
- Verhees D-Plane 1
