= Verhees D-Plane 1 =

Belgian homebuilt aircraft

D-Plane 1
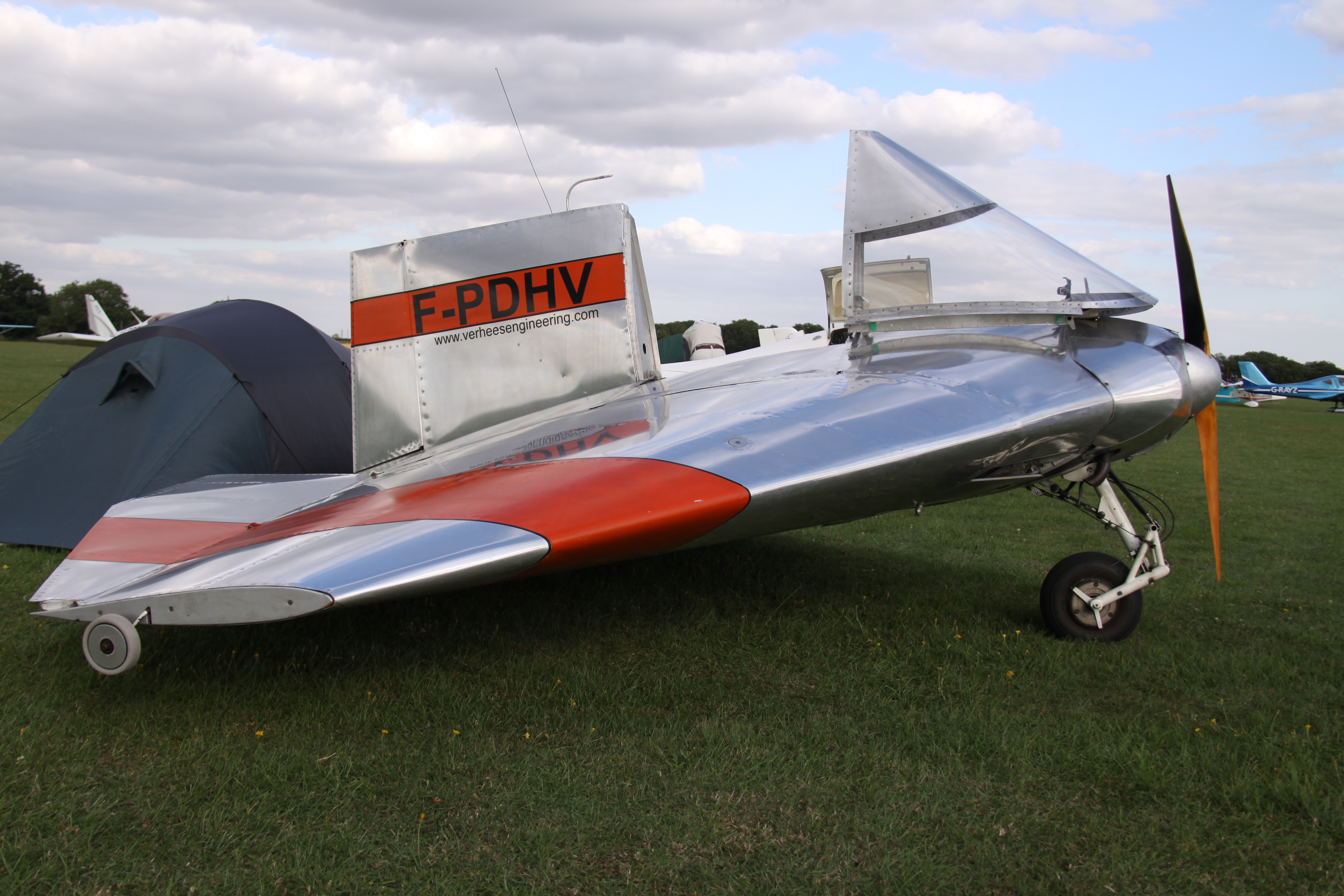
- Verhees D-Plane 1 prototype

General information
- Type: Amateur-built aircraft
- National origin: Belgium
- Manufacturer: Verhees Engineering
- Status: Plans available (2012)
- Number built: One prototype

History
- First flight: October 2004

The Verhees D-Plane 1 is a Belgian homebuilt flying wing, designed by Verhees Engineering and supplied as plans for amateur construction.

== Design and development ==
The D-Plane 1 features a cantilever mid-wing, a single-seat enclosed cockpit, semi-retractable tandem landing gear with small tail and wingtip wheels and a single engine in tractor configuration. Control surfaces include an elevon at the trailing edge of each wing and a conventional vertical stabilizer with a rudder.

The aircraft is made chiefly from sheet aluminum. Its very low aspect ratio 4.5 m (14.8 ft) span delta wing has an area of 10 m^{2} (110 sq ft). The single nose-mounted wheel retracts while the tail and wing tip wheels are fixed. The recommended engine is the 1.6 litre displacement 50 hp (37 kW) Subaru EA71 four-stroke flat-4 (boxer) automotive conversion powerplant.

By 2011 only the prototype D-Plane 1 had flown, but development work had begun on the design of the two-seat D-Plane 2. It first flew in early 2018, is powered by a 100 hp (75 kW) Rotax 912ULS engine and cruises at about 250 km/h (155 mph).

== Specifications (D-Plane 1) ==
Data from Bayerl

General characteristics

- Crew: one
- Wingspan: 4.5 m (14 ft 9 in)
- Wing area: 10 m^{2} (110 sq ft)
- Empty weight: 210 kg (463 lb)
- Gross weight: 340 kg (750 lb)
- Fuel capacity: 60 litres (13 imp gal; 16 US gal)
- Powerplant: 1 × Subaru EA71 four-cylinder, liquid-cooled, four-stroke automotive conversion, 37 kW (50 hp)

Performance

- Maximum speed: 270 km/h (170 mph, 150 kn)
- Cruise speed: 220 km/h (140 mph, 120 kn)
- Stall speed: 85 km/h (53 mph, 46 kn)
- Wing loading: 34.0 kg/m^{2} (7.0 lb/sq ft)

== See also ==
- Lifting body

Aircraft of comparable role, configuration, and era

- Baker MB-1
- Dean Delt-Air 250
- Dyke Delta
- Löhr Delta
- Wainfan Facetmobile
