= Wainfan Facetmobile =

Homebuilt aircraft

FMX-4 Facetmobile
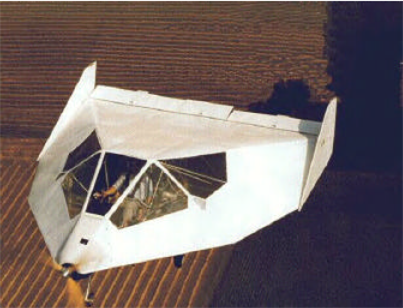
- The FMX-4 Facetmobile in flight

General information
- Type: Homebuilt Aircraft
- National origin: United States
- Designer: Barnaby Wainfan
- Number built: 1

History
- First flight: April 22, 1993

The Wainfan FMX-4 Facetmobile is an American homebuilt aircraft designed by Barnaby Wainfan, a Northrop Grumman aerodynamicist and homebuilt aircraft engineer & columnist with Kitplanes magazine (the Wind Tunnel column).

The FMX-4 Facetmobile prototype was built by Lynne Wainfan, Barnaby Wainfan, and Rick Dean in Chino, California. Designer Barnaby Wainfan flew the plane to the Experimental Aircraft Association's Oshkosh fly-in in July 1994. That debut along with media coverage has sparked interest in its unique design and gentle flying qualities. The aircraft is unusual in that it is a lifting body – the whole aircraft acts as a low aspect ratio wing: a flat, angular lifting shape, unlike traditional aircraft which use distinct lift-generating wings attached to a non-lifting fuselage. Also notably the aircraft's shape is formed of a series of 11 flat surfaces, somewhat similar to the body of the F-117 Nighthawk jet strike aircraft in using flat plates, but without separate wing structures. Although aerodynamic efficiency is reduced due to the simplistic shaping, that shaping reduces structural weight, improving payload mass fraction.

== Design and development ==
=== Shape ===
The FMX-4 Facetmobile shape forms 11 flat planes, plus two wingtip rudders. Three flat shapes form the bottom of the aircraft (slightly inclined front, flat middle, and sharply raised back), and eight form the top (one large downwards-sloping rear section, one thin nose section, and three inclined side panels per side). The wing section is an 18% thickness ratio, much thicker than the typical 12-15% thickness of normal light aircraft wings. At least one commercial model airplane kit of the Facetmobile is in production.

The prototype FMX-4 Facetmobile crashed on October 13, 1994, after an in-flight engine failure. The aircraft landed at low speed into a barbed wire fence, which caused extensive skin, engine, and some structural damage, though there was no injury to the pilot, Barnaby Wainfan. As of 2006, the aircraft has been partially repaired but not flown again.

=== Structure ===
The Facetmobile structure is composed of 6061 aluminum tubing fastened with Cherrymax rivets. The fuselage uses conventional fabric covering. The aircraft uses elevons and rudders for control. The landing gear is a fixed tricycle type. The large windshield sections are augmented by two floor-mounted windows. The aircraft is boarded through a bottom-mounted hatch. The aircraft has a BRS parachute system installed.

== Variants ==
Wainfan has proposed two derivative aircraft based on the FMX-4 Facetmobile.

- FMX-5 Facetmobile, a larger 2-seat design using the same aluminum-tube-and-fabric construction.
- An unnamed similar 2-seat design using advanced flat composite panel construction.

== Specifications (Facetmobile FMX-4) ==
Data from

General characteristics

- Crew: 1
- Length: 19 ft 6 in (5.94 m)
- Wingspan: 15 ft (4.6 m)
- Wing area: 214 sq ft (19.9 m^{2})
- Empty weight: 370 lb (168 kg)
- Gross weight: 740 lb (336 kg)
- Fuel capacity: 10-13 gallons
- Powerplant: 1 × Rotax 503 DC , 50 hp (37 kW)
- Propellers: 3-bladed GSC ground adjustable

Performance

- Maximum speed: 96 kn (110 mph, 178 km/h)
- Cruise speed: 80 kn (92 mph, 150 km/h)
- Rate of climb: 750 ft/min (3.8 m/s)
- Wing loading: 3.45 lb/sq ft (16.8 kg/m^{2})

== See also ==
- Lifting body

Aircraft of comparable role, configuration, and era

- Dean Delt-Air 250
- Dyke Delta
- Rohr 2-175
- Verhees D-Plane 1
