= Landing gear extender =

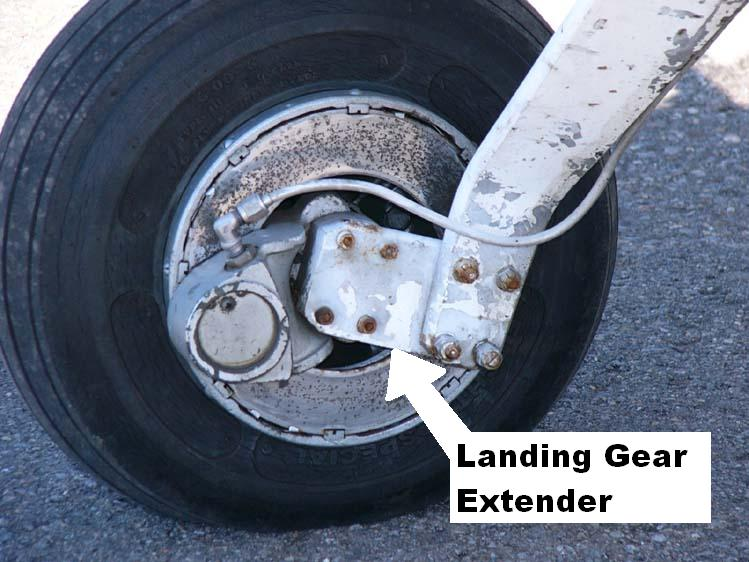
Landing gear extenders installed on a Cessna 140.

Landing gear extenders are devices used on conventional or tailwheel-equipped aircraft. They move the wheels forward of the landing gear leg by 2-3 inches (5–8 cm).

The installation of landing gear extenders is almost always the result of operational experience with an aircraft design that shows a problem with the landing gear – when the brakes are applied heavily the aircraft has a tendency to go up on its nose and strike the propeller on the ground. The landing gear extenders move the wheels forward relative to the centre of gravity, thus reducing this tendency.

Landing gear extenders were optional factory equipment on the late-1940s Cessna 120 and 140.
