= All American Aircraft =

Defunct American aircraft manufacturer

All American Aircraft Inc.
- Company type: Private company
- Industry: Aircraft manufacturing
- Founded: 1945
- Headquarters: Long Beach, California, United States
- Key people: Ernest Adler (founder), Gerald Adler (co-founder)
- Products: Light aircraft prototypes

All American Aircraft Inc was an aircraft manufacturer established in 1945 at Long Beach, California by Ernest and Gerald Adler. The firm built prototypes of a light plane design by Ernest, the Ensign, but was unable to find buyers to make mass production viable.

Like many small startup firms in the immediate postwar period, the company sought to enter the emerging light-aircraft market, which was expected to expand rapidly with returning pilots and increased general-aviation interest. The company developed a two-seat light aircraft design called the Ensign, intended for the personal-aircraft market.Like many small startup firms in the immediate postwar period, the company sought to enter the emerging light-aircraft market, which was expected to expand rapidly with returning pilots and increased general-aviation interest. The company developed a two-seat light aircraft design called the Ensign, intended for the personal-aircraft market.
