= Mace-Trefethen Seamaster =

Seamaster

General information
- Type: Racing aircraft
- National origin: United States
- Designer: Harvey Mace, Al Trefethen, Tom Trefethen

History
- Introduction date: 1960s
- Developed from: PAR Special

The Mace-Trefethen Seamaster is an American single seat seaplane racer.

== Design and development ==
The Seamaster was built by Alfred and Thomas Trefethen and Harvey Mace, using components from the PAR Special pusher monoplane. It is a single place, mid-wing seaplane with a Y tail layout and a single 90 lb (41 kg) fuselage-mounted float. The pusher propeller configuration of the PAR Special was modified to that of a conventional tractor layout.

== Specifications (Seamaster) ==
General characteristics

- Crew: 1
- Length: 25 ft (7.6 m)
- Wingspan: 20 ft (6.1 m)
- Wing area: 66 sq ft (6.1 m^{2})
- Empty weight: 728 lb (330 kg)
- Powerplant: 1 × Continental O-200 Packet 60 , 90 hp (67 kW)
