= Continental O-190 =

Series of small American piston aircraft engines

O-190 / C75 / C85
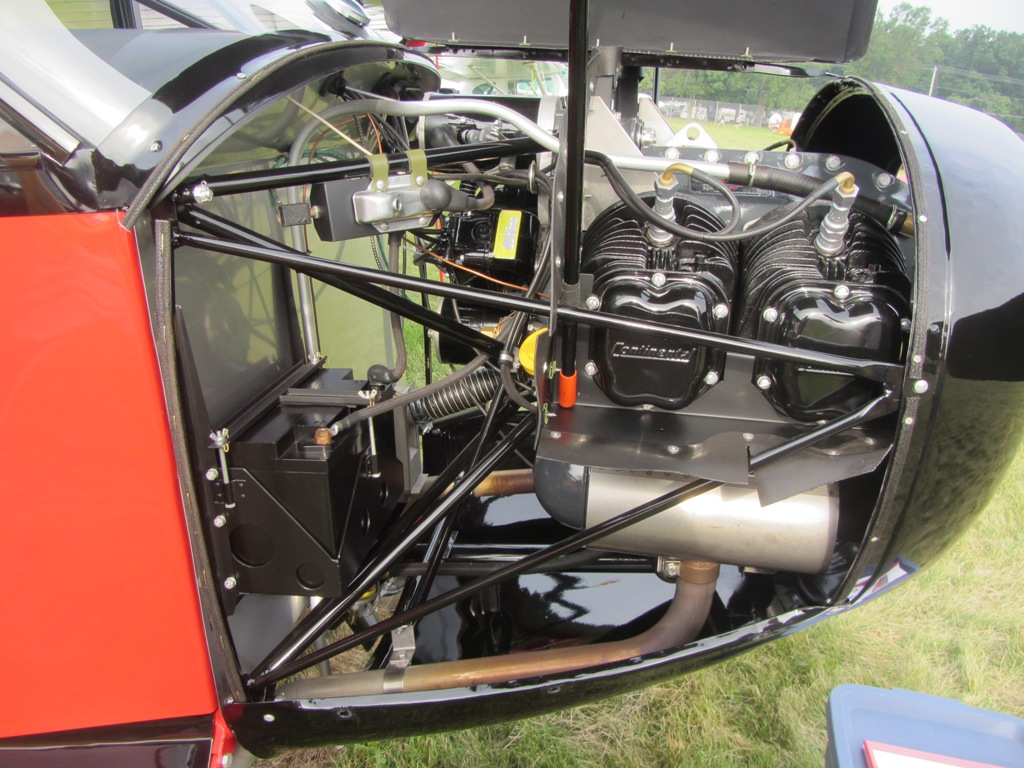
- O-190 mounted in a Funk B
- Type: Piston aircraft engine
- Manufacturer: Teledyne Continental Motors
- Major applications: Cessna 140

The Continental O-190 (Company designations C75 and C85) is a series of engines made by Continental Motors beginning in the 1940s. Of flat-four configuration, the engines produced 75 hp (56 kW) or 85 hp (63 kW) respectively.

The two variants shared the same bore, stroke and compression ratio. The C85 produced ten extra horsepower by virtue of having a maximum permissible rpm of 2575 versus the 2275 of the C75.

The C75 was in production from 1943 to 1952 and the C85 from 1944 to 1970.

== Variants ==
=== C75 ===
C75-8
75 hp (56 kW)
C75-8
75 hp (56 kW)
C75-8F
75 hp (56 kW)
C75-8FH
75 hp (56 kW)
C75-8FHJ
75 hp (56 kW)
C75-8FJ
75 hp (56 kW)
C75-8J
75 hp (56 kW)
C75-12
75 hp (56 kW)
C75-12F
75 hp (56 kW)
C75-12FH
75 hp (56 kW)
C75-12FHJ
75 hp (56 kW)
C75-12FJ
75 hp (56 kW)
C75-12J
75 hp (56 kW)
C75-12B
75 hp (56 kW)
C75-12BF
75 hp (56 kW)
C75-12BFH
75 hp (56 kW)
C75-15
75 hp (56 kW)
C75-15F
75 hp (56 kW)

=== C85 ===
C85-8
85 hp (63 kW)
C85-8F
85 hp (63 kW)
C85-8FHJ
85 hp (63 kW)
C85-8FJ
85 hp (63 kW)
C85-8J
85 hp (63 kW)
C85-12
85 hp (63 kW)
C85-12F
85 hp (63 kW)
C85-12FH
85 hp (63 kW)
C85-12FHJ
85 hp (63 kW)
C85-12FJ
85 hp (63 kW)
C85-12J
85 hp (63 kW)
C85-14F
85 hp (63 kW)
C85-15
85 hp (63 kW)
C85-15F
85 hp (63 kW)

== Applications ==
=== C75 ===
- Auster Arrow
- ERCO Ercoupe 415-C (postwar), 415-CD, 415-D, 415-H
- Thorp T-11

=== C85 ===
- Aerauto PL.5C
- Aero-Flight Streak
- Aeronca 7DC Champion
- Aeronca L-16A (7BCM Champion)
- Aeronca 11BC Chief, 11CC Super Chief
- Aeronca 12AC Chum (license-built ERCO Ercoupe)
- All-American Ensign
- Allenbaugh Grey Ghost
- Ambrosini Rondone
- Baker MB-1 Delta Kitten
- Carlson Sparrow
- Cessna 120 and 140
- Commonwealth Skyranger and Trimmer
- Culver V
- Druine Turbi
- ERCO Ercoupe 415-E, 415-F, 415-G
- Eaves Cougar 1
- Fleet 80 and 81
- Fisher Celebrity
- Fisher Dakota Hawk
- Funk B-85-C
- Globe Swift
- Jurca Tempête
- Heinonen HK-1
- LeVier Cosmic Wind
- Lombardi FL.3
- Luscombe 8E Silvaire Deluxe
- Macchi MB-308
- PAR Special
- Petit Special
- Phoenix Major
- Piel Emeraude
- Pritchard Rocket Air Ship
- Smith Miniplane
- Stits Playboy
- Stits SA-2A Sky Baby
- Taylor Titch
- Taylorcraft BC-12D-85, BCS-12D-85, BC-12D-4-85, BCS-12D-4-85, Model 19

== Specifications (C85) ==
Data from Continental Aircraft Engine Operator's Manual

=== General characteristics ===
- Type: four-cylinder air-cooled horizontally opposed aircraft piston engine
- Bore: 4.0625 in (103 mm)
- Stroke: 3.625 in (92 mm)
- Displacement: 188 in^{3} (3.1 L)
- Dry weight: 180 lb (81 kg)

=== Components ===
- Fuel type: 80/87 octane avgas
- Cooling system: Air-cooled

=== Performance ===
- Power output: 85 hp (63 kW) at 2,575 rpm
- Compression ratio: 6.3:1
- Fuel consumption: 5.4 US gal/hr
- Oil consumption: Maximum desirable 0.4 US quarts/hr

== See also ==
Related lists

- List of aircraft engines
