= Funk B =

1930s American two-seat cabin monoplane

Funk Model B
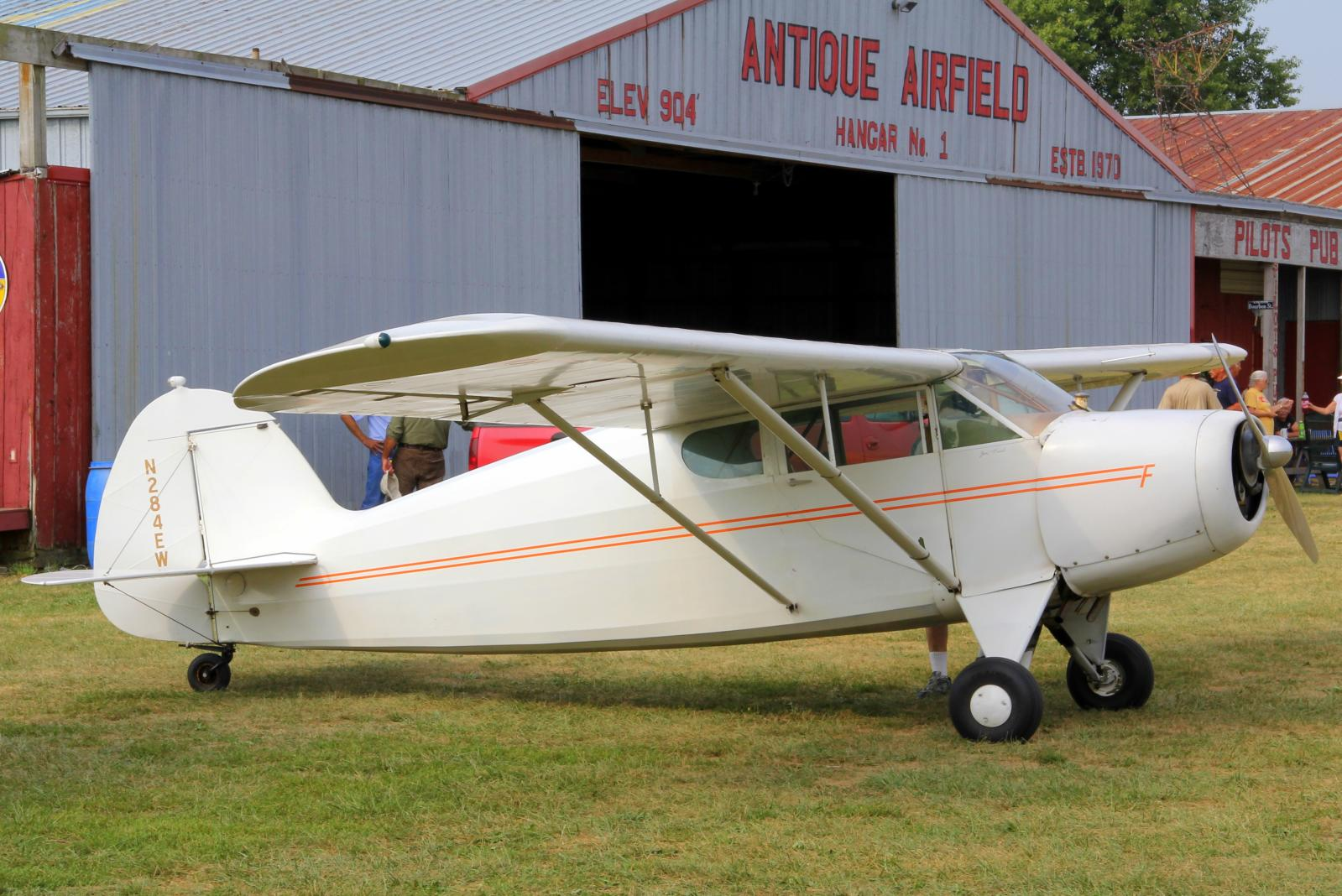
- Funk B-85-L

General information
- Type: Two-seat cabin monoplane
- Manufacturer: Akron Aircraft Company; Funk Aircraft Company
- Designer: Howard and Joe Funk
- Number built: 380

History
- First flight: 1933

The Funk Model B is a 1930s American two-seat cabin monoplane designed by Howard and Joe Funk. Originally built by the Akron Aircraft Company later renamed Funk Aircraft Company.

== Development ==
The Model B was the first powered aircraft designed by brothers Howard and Joe Funk, whose previous experience was in homebuilt gliders and sailplanes. The Model B was a strut-braced high-wing monoplane with a conventional tail unit and fixed tailwheel landing gear. The design uses mixed construction with fabric-covered wooden wings and a welded steel-tube fuselage. The aircraft was powered by the brothers' own Model E engine developed from a Ford "B" motor-car engine. The prototype first flew in late 1933.

== Production and operations ==
When the test flights proved to be successful the brothers formed the Akron Aircraft Company in 1939 to build the Funk B. After production began, the engine was changed to a 75 hp (56 kW) Lycoming GO-145-C2 horizontally opposed four-cylinder engine and was re-designated the Model B-75-L.

In 1941 the company moved from Akron to Kansas and the company was renamed the Funk Aircraft Company. Production was stopped during the Second World War and one aircraft was impressed into service in 1942 with the United States Army Air Corps as the UC-92.

After the war in 1946 production was resumed using a Continental C85-12 engine and the aircraft was redesignated the Model B-85-C and named the Bee. It did not sell well and production was halted in 1948. 380 aircraft of all variants had been built.

== Variants ==
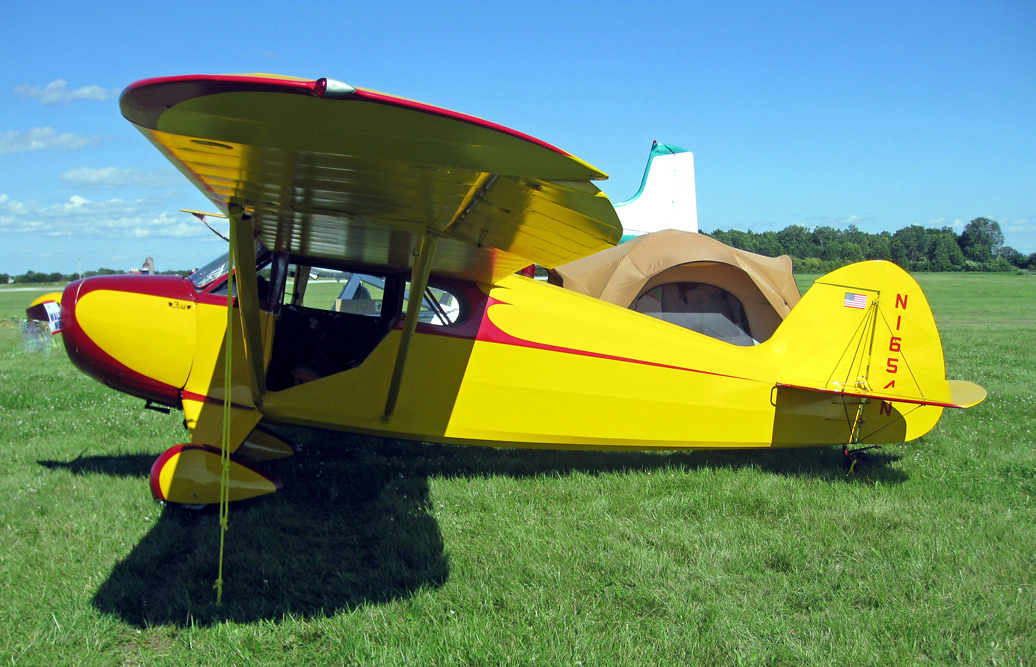
1948-built Funk B-85-C at Oshkosh, Wisconsin, in 2010

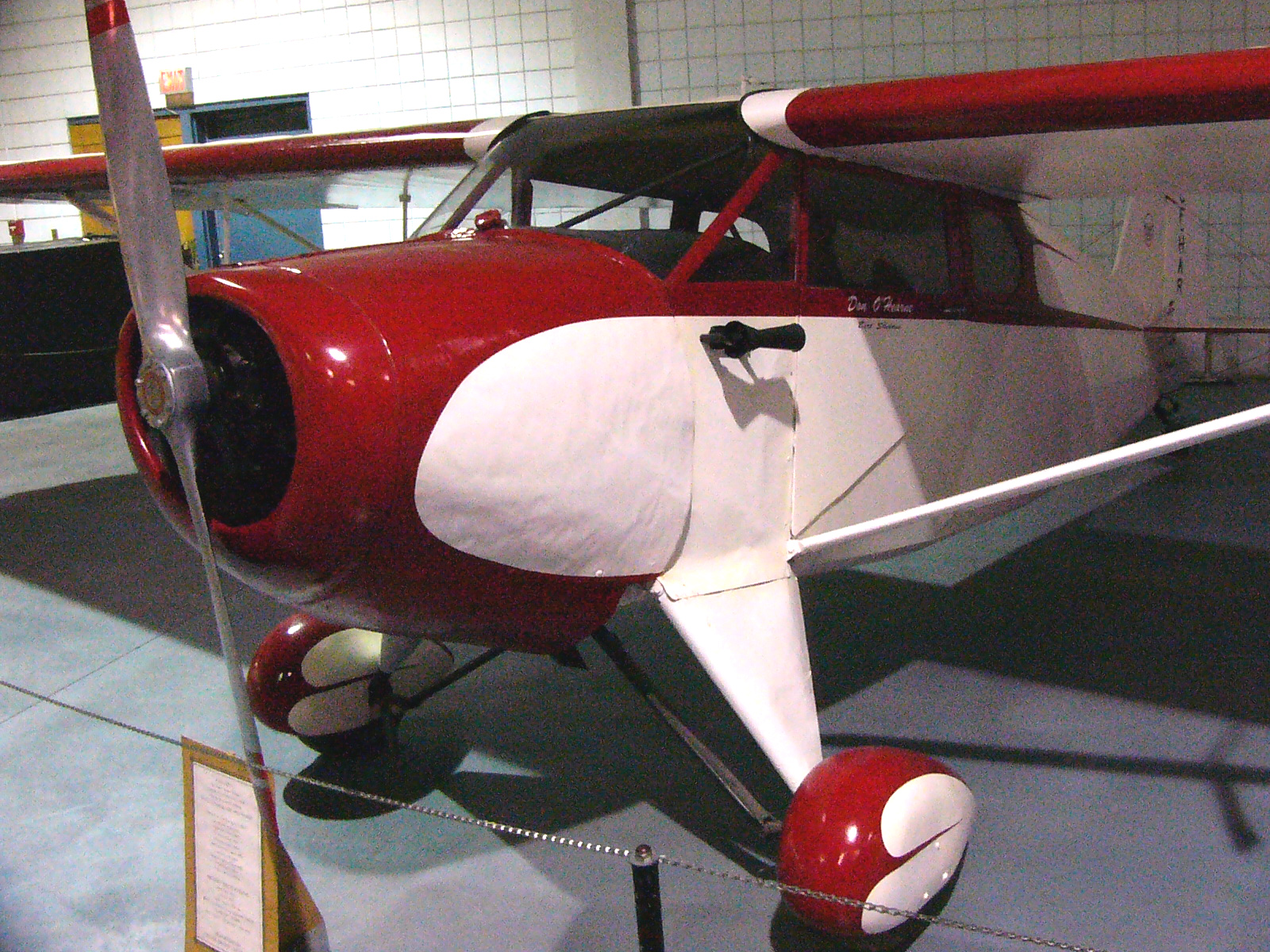
Funk B-85-C in the Saskatchewan Western Development Museum

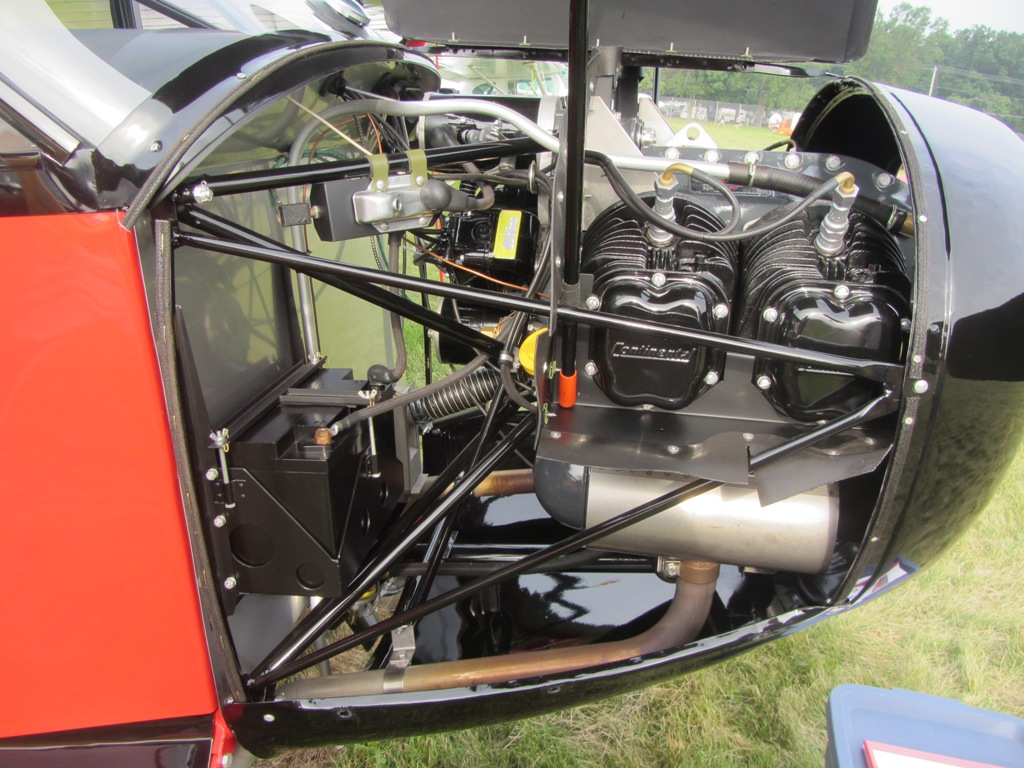
B-85-C Continental C85-12 engine

Model B
Prototype and initial production aircraft with Funk E engine.
Model B-75-L
Pre-war production aircraft with a 75hp (56 kW) Avco Lycoming GO-145-C2 piston engine.
Model B-85-C Bee
Post-war production aircraft with a Continental C85-12 engine.
UC-92
Army designation for one impressed Model B-75-L (s/n 42-79548).

== Specifications (B-85-C) ==
Data from Jane's All The World's Aircraft 1951–52

General characteristics

- Crew: 2
- Length: 20 ft 1 in (6.12 m)
- Wingspan: 35 ft 0 in (10.67 m)
- Height: 6 ft 1 in (1.85 m)
- Wing area: 169 sq ft (15.7 m^{2})
- Airfoil: NACA 4412
- Empty weight: 890 lb (404 kg)
- Gross weight: 1,350 lb (612 kg)
- Fuel capacity: 20 US gal (76 L; 17 imp gal)
- Powerplant: 1 × Continental C85-12 four-cylinder air-cooled horizontally-opposed engine, 85 hp (63 kW)
- Propellers: 2-bladed Lewis fixed pitch

Performance

- Maximum speed: 115 mph (185 km/h, 100 kn) at sea level
- Cruise speed: 100 mph (160 km/h, 87 kn)
- Range: 350 mi (560 km, 300 nmi) with 30 minutes reserve
- Service ceiling: 15,000 ft (4,600 m)
- Rate of climb: 800 ft/min (4.1 m/s)
- Take-off run: 348 ft (107 m)

== See also ==
Related lists

- List of military aircraft of the United States

== Bibliography ==
- John Andrade, U.S. Military Aircraft Designations and Serials since 1909, Midland Counties Publications, 1979, ISBN 0-904597-22-9 (Page 171)
- Bridgman, Leonard. Jane's All The World's Aircraft 1951–52. London: Sampson Low, Marston & Company, Ltd, 1951.
- Simpson, Rod, Airlife's World Aircraft, 2001, Airlife Publishing Ltd, ISBN 1-84037-115-3 (Page 248)
- Simpson, Rod. The General Aviation Handbook. 2005. Midland Publishing. ISBN 1-85780-222-5
- The Illustrated Encyclopedia of Aircraft (Part Work 1982-1985), 1985, Orbis Publishing
