= John and Jennie Dyke =

American aircraft designers

John and Jennie Dyke are an American husband-and-wife team who created unusual delta-wing aircraft in the 1960s. They flew the JD-1 in 1964, and followed it two years later with the JD-2, which became known simply as the Dyke Delta. This aircraft was marketed for homebuilding for many years, with some 360 known to be under construction or flying by 1992. John Dyke has been nominated for consideration as a candidate for enshrinement into the National Aviation Hall of Fame as of September 2024.
