= All American Ensign =

10A Ensign
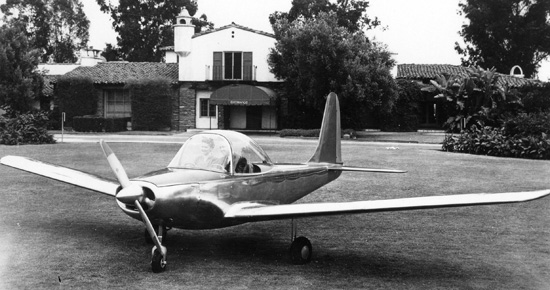

General information
- Type: Utility aircraft
- Manufacturer: All American
- Designer: Ernest Adler
- Number built: ~4

History
- First flight: 1945

The All American 10A Ensign was a two-seat light plane built in the United States shortly after World War II. It was a low-wing, all-metal cantilever monoplane with fixed tricycle undercarriage and which seated its pilot and passenger side by side under an expansive bubble canopy. Due to the glut of military surplus aircraft on the civil market after the war, All American was unable to attract buyers and no production ensued.

== Variants ==
- 10A
- 10D - proposed development with retractable undercarriage and 125 hp (93 kW) engine

== Specifications (performance estimated) ==
Data from Mass Output Set for New Ensign, Jane's all the World's Aircraft 1947

General characteristics

- Crew: 2
- Length: 22 ft (6.7 m)
- Wingspan: 33 ft (10 m)
- Height: 8 ft 6 in (2.59 m)
- Wing area: 140 sq ft (13 m^{2})
- Empty weight: 900 lb (408 kg)
- Gross weight: 1,450 lb (658 kg)
- Fuel capacity: 25 US gal (21 imp gal; 95 L) in a single fuselage tank
- Powerplant: 1 × Continental C85 air-cooled flat four, 85 hp (63 kW) (up to 125 hp (93 kW))
- Propellers: 2-bladed Sensenich wooden fixed pitch propeller

Performance

- Maximum speed: 125 mph (201 km/h, 109 kn)
- Cruise speed: 112 mph (180 km/h, 97 kn) *Landing speed 50 mph (43 kn; 80 km/h)
- Range: 400 mi (640 km, 350 nmi)
- Service ceiling: 13,500 ft (4,100 m)
- Rate of climb: 700 ft/min (3.6 m/s)
- Wing loading: 10.35 lb/sq ft (50.5 kg/m^{2})
- Power/mass: 17 lb/hp (10.33 kg/kW)
