= Dyke Delta =

Type of aircraft

Dyke Delta JD-2
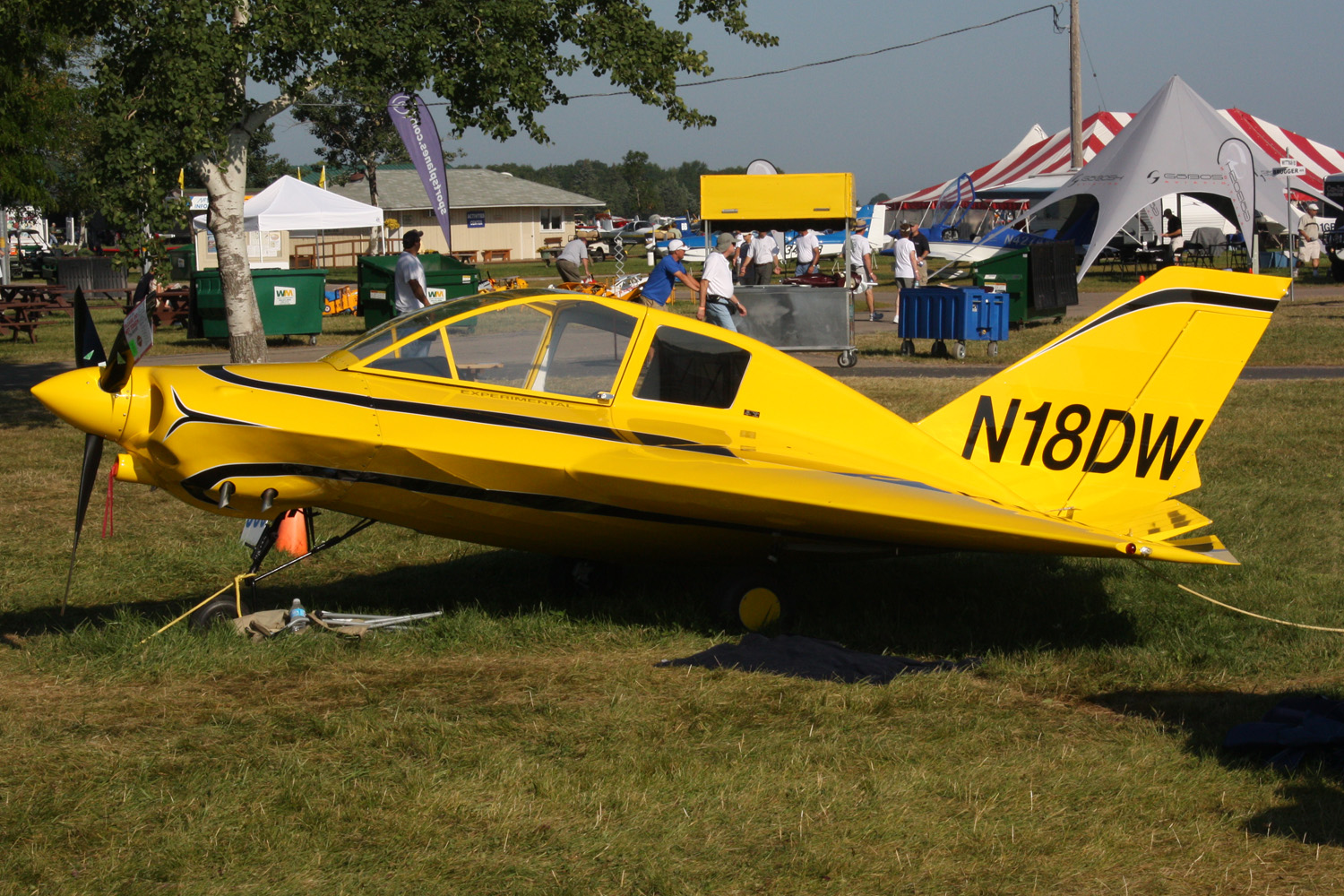
- EAA AirVenture 2008

General information
- Type: Homebuilt aircraft
- National origin: United States
- Designer: John and Jennie Dyke
- Number built: 50

History
- First flight: July 1966

The Dyke Delta JD-2 is an American homebuilt aircraft designed in the United States in the 1960s and marketed for amateur construction. It is a monoplane with retractable tricycle undercarriage and seating for four. The wings can be folded for towing or storage and hinge upwards to lie flat above the fuselage, one atop the other. Construction is of SAE 4130 grade steel tube framework with fiberglass and fabric skins.

In its standard configuration, the aircraft is a true double-delta with no horizontal stabilizer; however, a small T-tail is an option for trimming variants with higher-power engines. Since the mid-1960s, designer John Dyke has sold full construction plans and three-view drawings for the aircraft to homebuilders and is still selling them today. No kits were ever marketed. Over fifty examples have been completed.

== Development ==
Designer John Dyke said his inspiration for the aircraft came from Alexander Lippisch's delta designs, specifically the LP-6 glider and later the Convair F-102 Delta Dagger. The double delta layout of the Saab 35 Draken was incorporated into the design. A lifting body fuselage was incorporated after tests.

For research into the proposed layout, Dyke built models mounted on the front of his car and flew radio-controlled models to determine aerodynamic qualities. This led to Dyke's first actual aircraft, the JD-1 Delta, which first flew in July 1962. That aircraft was destroyed in June 1964 when a welding incident in the garage caused a fire. The aircraft had accumulated 145 hours of flight testing by then, and his wife persuaded Dyke to build an improved version as the Dyke JD-2 Delta. Its first flight was on 18 July 1966, and across 40 years it accumulated over two thousand flight hours.

== Design ==
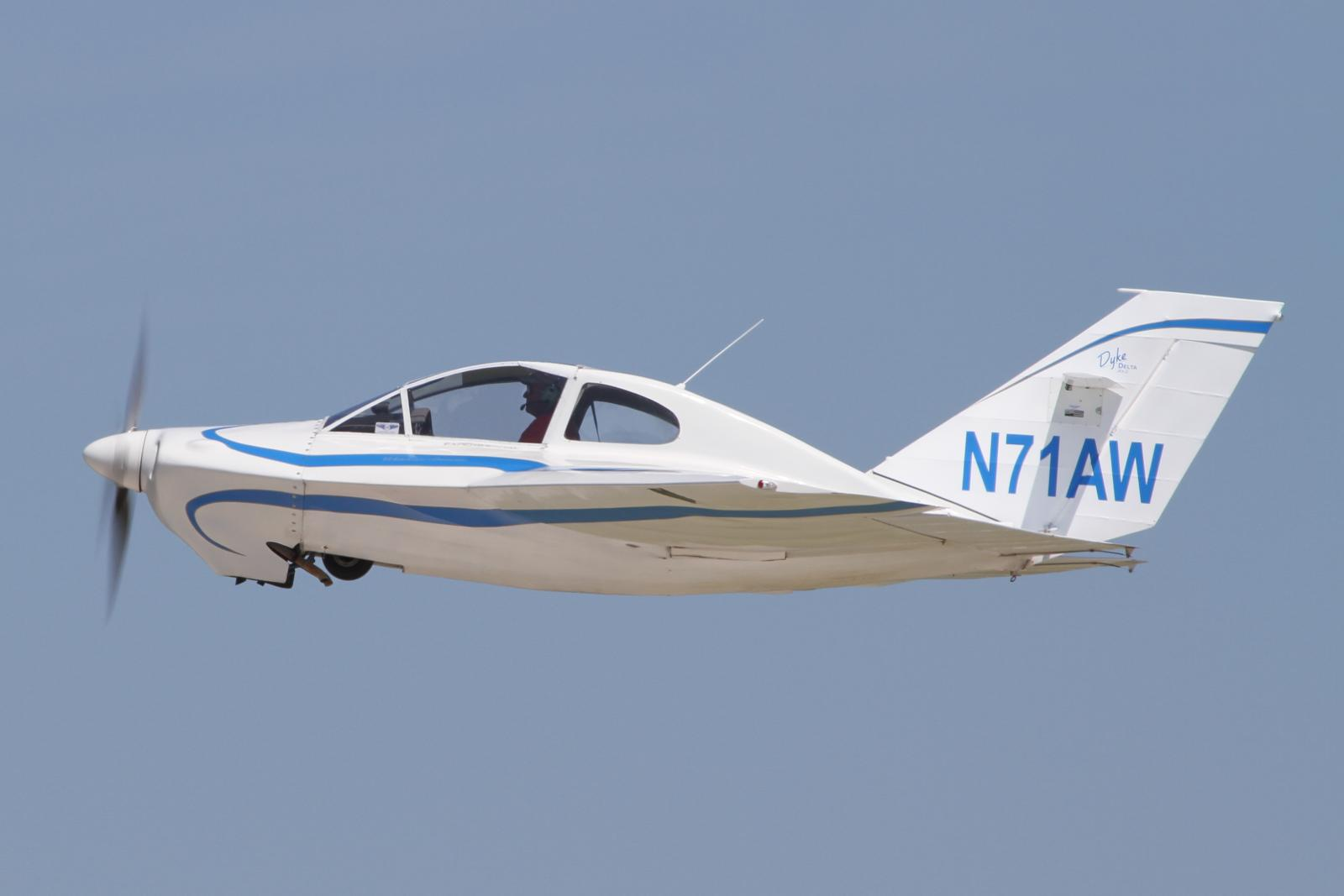
Dyke Delta JD-2 in flight at EAA AirVenture Oshkosh in 2011, with landing gear retracted.

The aircraft is metal framed with skin of laminated fiberglass or covering of Dacron fabric. Its landing gear is retractable. The delta configuration offers a relatively high cruise speed compared to conventional aircraft of the same weight and power. Its stall speed (70–75 mph) is relatively high for a small single-engine aircraft, and its configuration at touchdown is relatively nose-high. Approach speeds of 100–110 mph are used.

== Operational history ==
Including the prototype, under a dozen are in a known flying condition today, though nearly that many are currently under construction. As of 2021, at least 50 examples are known to be in existence.

The Dyke Delta was involved in NASA-funded flight-testing. Kelly Aerospace towed the Delta behind another aircraft to obtain flight towing and engine-off (glider) controllability data for use on future space-travel designs. The Dyke Delta flew quite well in tow and in a glide. Over the years, the JD-2 structure was evaluated by the University of Utah and the Wright-Patterson Air Force Base (Ohio) Structural Laboratory.

== Variants ==
- JD-1 Dyke Delta - a small version, with 1+2 seating and fixed landing gear, used to generate and verify delta-wing and tailless-configuration flight characteristics. First flight July 1962; destroyed June 1964.
- JD-2 Dyke Delta - an updated and enlarged version, with 1+3 seating and retractable landing gear. Debuted at Experimental Aircraft Association Annual Fly-In (Rockford IL) in 1966. Portions of the JD-1 were used in constructing the JD-2.
- Dyke Delta Stingray – a one-off development by US homebuilder Lowell Borchers, utilizing wood construction for a single-place airplane. It won a trophy at the 1980 EAA Annual Fly-In.

== Specifications (Dyke Delta JD-2) ==
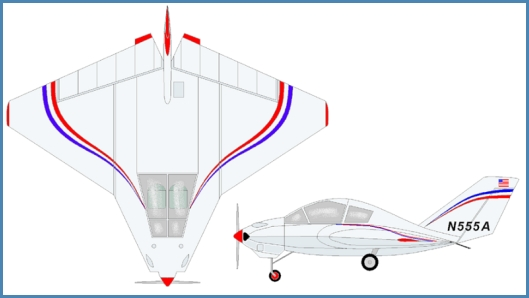
KN Dyke JD2 Delta 1964

General characteristics

- Crew: One pilot
- Capacity: 3: 2 passengers, with a small third passenger in the center bench seat position
- Length: 19 ft 0 in (5.79 m)
- Wingspan: 22 ft 3 in (6.87 m)
- Height: 5 ft 6 in (1.68 m)
- Wing area: 173 sq ft (16.0 m^{2})
- Empty weight: 1,060 lb (481 kg)
- Gross weight: 1,980 lb (884 kg)
- Powerplant: 1 × Lycoming O-360 , 180 hp (134 kW)

Performance

- Maximum speed: 200 mph (322 km/h, 170 kn)
- Cruise speed: 170 mph (273 km/h, 150 kn)
- Range: 870 mi (1,400 km, 760 nmi)
- Service ceiling: 14,500 ft (4,420 m)

== Aircraft on display ==
Dyke Delta

- JD-2 Dyke Delta (no power plant) - Texas Air Museum - Stinson Chapter, San Antonio, Texas

== See also ==
Aircraft of comparable role, configuration, and era

- Baker MB-1 Delta Kitten
- Löhr Delta
- Verhees D-Plane 1
- Wainfan Facetmobile
