= PAR Special =

1950s American experimental aircraft

Special
- Front quarter view of the PAR Special, at rest.

General information
- Type: Experimental aircraft
- National origin: American
- Manufacturer: Parks Alumni Racebuilders
- Status: Dismantled
- Number built: 1

History
- Introduction date: 1950
- First flight: February, 1950
- Retired: 1952
- Developed into: Mace-Trefethen Seamaster

The PAR Special was a high-speed experimental monoplane built by a consortium of aviation engineers, and competed in air races in the early 1950s.

== Design and development ==
The Special was a project of four St. Louis-based McDonnell Aircraft employees; Arthur Beckington, George Owl, Errol Painter, and Robert Short. They formed a partnership called Parks Alumni Racebuilders, or PAR, named as a tribute to the Parks Air College that all four had graduated from.

The Special was a shoulder-wing single-engine pusher monoplane, of wood and metal construction. It incorporated a variable-incidence wing, with a jackscrew mechanism allowing the wing to be adjusted in flight, with the angle of incidence covering the range from 0.5 through to 13.5 degrees. The wings were cantilevered and had a tapered planform, with neither sweep nor dihedral.

The pilot was positioned just ahead of the wing, and sat under a bubble canopy. A centrally located Continental C85 engine powered, via an extension-shaft, a two-bladed fixed-pitch propeller positioned aft of the empennage. The aircraft had a Y tail configuration, with an inverted tailfin that ensured that the propeller had sufficient ground clearance. Its undercarriage consisted of tandem main wheels, partially recessed into the underside of the fuselage. Skateboard wheels were attached to the trailing edge of each wingtip.

The aircraft was given the race number 87 and the registration N90522.

== Operational history ==
The Special was first flown by Art Beckington in February 1950. From that year through to 1952, it competed in several air races, achieving lap speeds of 181 mph (291 km/h). It was not as competitive as had been expected and in 1952 the Special was retired and later dismantled.

Its wings, rear fuselage, and tail were passed onto Thomas Trefethen and Harvey Mace, who incorporated them into a single-engine tractor seaplane they had constructed in the mid-1960s, the Mace-Trefethen Seamaster.

== Specifications ==
Data from Southern Flight

General characteristics

- Crew: 1
- Length: 20 ft (6.1 m)
- Wingspan: 20 ft (6.1 m)
- Wing area: 67 sq ft (6.2 m^{2})
- Airfoil: NACA 23009-23012
- Empty weight: 640 lb (290 kg)
- Gross weight: 900 lb (408 kg)
- Powerplant: 1 × Continental C85 flat-four, 85 hp (63 kW)
- Propellers: 2-bladed

Performance

- Maximum speed: 234 mph (377 km/h, 203 kn) estimated
- Stall speed: 65 mph (105 km/h, 56 kn)

== See also ==
Aircraft of comparable role, configuration, and era

- Allenbaugh Grey Ghost
- Lesher Nomad
- Lesher Teal
- Petit Special
