= Allenbaugh Grey Ghost =

1940s American experimental aircraft

Grey Ghost
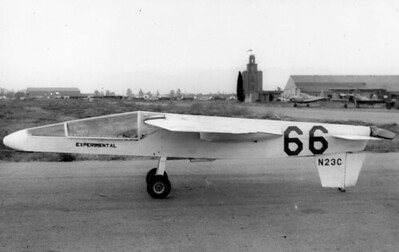
- Side view of the Allenbaugh Grey Ghost

General information
- Type: Experimental aircraft
- National origin: American
- Manufacturer: Edward Allenbaugh
- Status: Crashed
- Number built: 1

History
- First flight: 1948
- Retired: 1948

The Grey Ghost was a high-speed experimental monoplane built by Ed Allenbaugh, and intended to compete in the 1948 Goodyear Trophy.

== Design and development ==
The Grey Ghost was a shoulder-wing single-engine pusher monoplane, designed by Paul Schaupp and constructed by Ed Allenbaugh. It was notable for its small frontal area, with the fuselage measuring just 25 in (0.64 m) wide and 28 in (0.71 m) deep. The wings were cantilevered and had a tapered planform, with no dihedral. The pilot, positioned ahead of the wing, lay in an almost fully supine position. A centrally located Continental C85 engine powered, via an extension-shaft, a two-bladed fixed-pitch propeller that was positioned just aft of the empennage. The aircraft had a conventional tailplane, but an inverted tailfin that ensured that the propeller had sufficient ground clearance. It was equipped with a conventional fixed undercarriage.

The aircraft was painted white, with the race number 66 and the registration mark N23C being painted in red.

== Operational history ==
The Grey Ghost flew once. On August 15, 1948 it took off from Van Nuys Airport with Dwight Dempster at the controls. Several minutes into the flight, while flying at an altitude of 500 ft (150 m), the engine failed and the airplane went out of control. Dempster bailed out, but at too low an altitude for his parachute to open. He crashed through the roof of a garage at 1800 Nordhoff Street, Northridge, Los Angeles, dying instantly. The aircraft crashed at a nearby walnut grove.

As a result of this event, the Professional Race Pilots Association - organizers of the Goodyear races - outlawed aircraft incorporating the supine pilot position.

== Specifications (Grey Ghost) ==
Data from Sport Aviation, Aerofiles, and The Daily News

General characteristics

- Crew: 1
- Length: 19 ft 6 in (5.94 m)
- Wingspan: 18 ft (5.5 m)
- Width: 2 ft 1 in (0.64 m) fuselage
- Height: 2 ft 4 in (0.71 m) fuselage
- Empty weight: 500 lb (227 kg)
- Powerplant: 1 × Continental C85 flat-four, 85 hp (63 kW)
- Propellers: 2-bladed

Performance

- Maximum speed: 200 mph (320 km/h, 170 kn)

== See also ==
Aircraft of comparable role, configuration, and era

- Lesher Nomad
- Lesher Teal
- PAR Special
- Petit Special
