= Lesher Teal =

American experimental aircraft

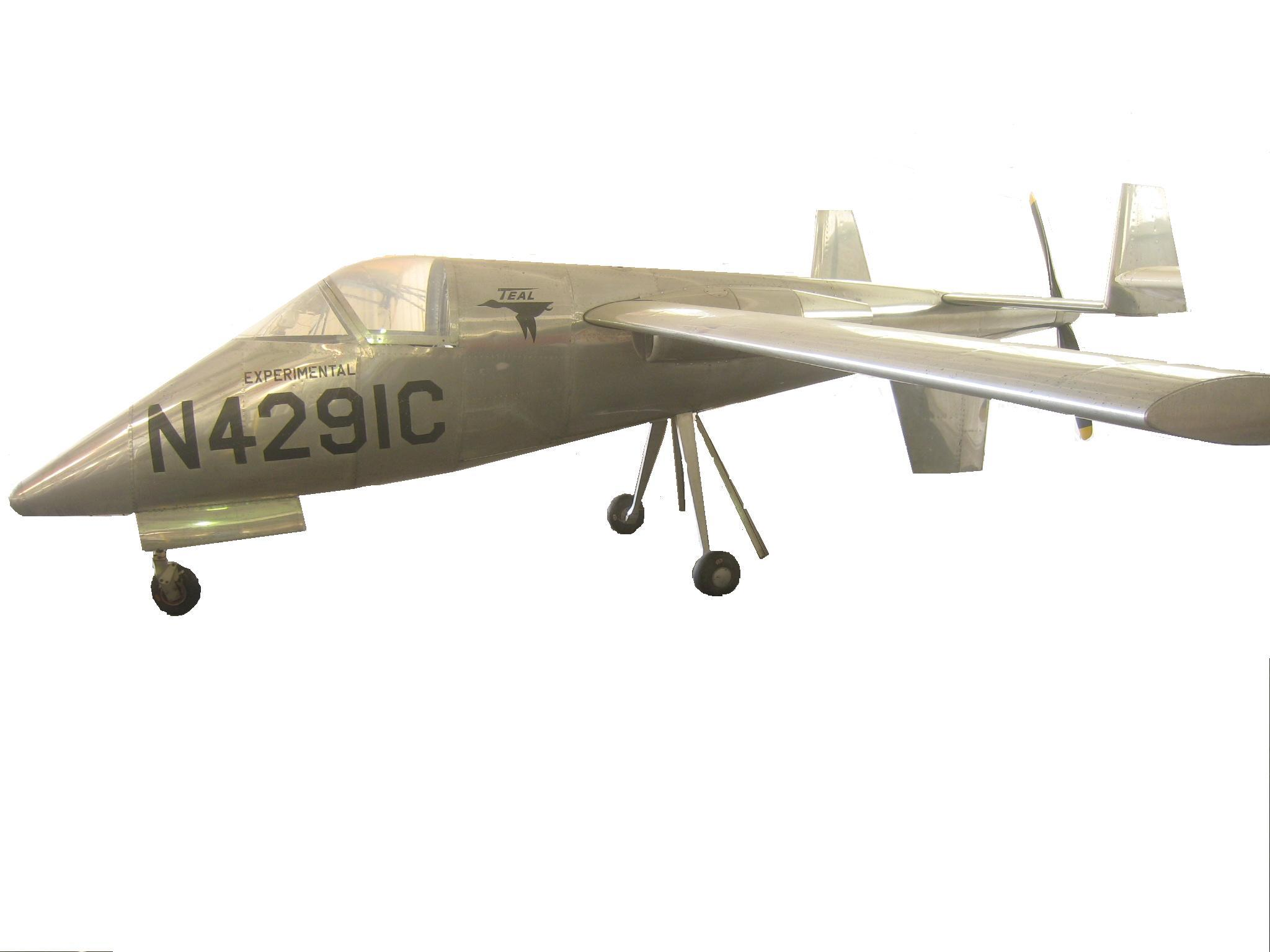
- Lesher Teal

General information
- Type: Homebuilt aircraft
- National origin: United States
- Designer: Edgar J Lesher
- Number built: 1

History
- First flight: 28 April 1965

The Lesher Teal is a home built experimental aircraft that at one point held seven Federation Aeronautique Internationale (FAI) class is C-l.a records for speed and distance.

== Design and development ==
The Teal was designed to beat the Federation Aeronautique Internationale (FAI) class is C-l.a records for speed and distance.

Construction started in 1962. The aircraft was configured as an all-aluminum single-place aircraft with retractable landing gear, powered by a 100 hp Continental O-200 engine driving a 64-inch Hartzell ground-adjustable propeller. By 28 April 1965, the airframe was complete. On that day, Lesher made the aircraft's first flight at Willow Run Airport. That August, he flew Teal to the 1965 EAA Fly-In in Rockford, Illinois, where he won an award from the EAA for his achievements.

== Operational history ==
After two years of testing the Teal, Lesher flew the aircraft, on 22 May 1967, to a new 500 km closed-course Class C1a speed record of 181.55 mph. On 30 June 1967, he set a new 1,000 km closed-course speed record of 169.20 mph and on 220 October 1967, he set a new 2,000 km closed-course speed record of 141.84 mph.

On 6 May 1968, while flying Teal near Ann Arbor, he experienced a loss of power. Not being able to make it to a nearby airport, he made an emergency landing in a field. The airplane was badly damaged, but he was unhurt. After rebuilding Teal, on 9 September 1970, he set a new Class C1a closed-circuit distance record of 1554.29 miles. Later, on 29 September 1973 he set a new Class C1a 3 km speed record of 173.101 mph and the next day he set a new 15–25 km speed record of 169.134 mph. Finally, on 2 July 1975, he set a new Class C1a record for distance in a straight line by flying 1,835.459, flying from Florida to Arizona. He continued to fly Teal for many more years, but never made any more record attempts. For his record-breaking flights, he won the FAI's Louis Bleriot Medal four times and was inducted in the Michigan Aviation Hall of Fame in 1988.

The Teal was donated to the EAA Airventure Museum in 2002.

== Specifications (Lesher Teal) ==
Data from Jane's All the Worlds Aircraft 1967–68.

General characteristics

- Length: 19 ft 3 in (5.87 m)
- Wingspan: 23 ft 10 in (7.26 m)
- Height: 5 ft 8 in (1.73 m)
- Wing area: 60.0 sq ft (5.57 m^{2})
- Aspect ratio: 9.6:1
- Airfoil: NACA 65_{3}618
- Empty weight: 685 lb (311 kg)
- Max takeoff weight: 1,102 lb (500 kg)
- Fuel capacity: 60 US gal (50 imp gal; 230 L)
- Powerplant: 1 × Continental O-200A-A air-cooled four-cylinder horizontally-opposed piston engine, 100 hp (75 kW)
- Propellers: 2-bladed Hartzell, 5 ft 4 in (1.63 m) diameter (ground-adjustable pusher)

Performance

- Cruise speed: 160 kn (180 mph, 290 km/h) (70% power)
- Stall speed: 70 kn (80 mph, 130 km/h)
- Range: 1,700 nmi (2,000 mi, 3,200 km)

== See also ==
Aircraft of comparable role, configuration, and era

- Allenbaugh Grey Ghost
- Lesher Nomad
- PAR Special
