= Lesher Nomad =

General information
- Type: Homebuilt aircraft
- National origin: United States
- Designer: Edgar J Lesher

History
- First flight: 1961

The Lesher Nomad is an innovative two-place homebuilt aircraft.

== Design and development ==
Designer Edgar J Lesher had previously worked at Stinson Aircraft Company in Wayne, Michigan on the Stinson 106 Skycoach. The Skycoach was a four-place aircraft with a pusher propeller, a configuration which captured Lesher's imagination.

In August 1958, he attended one of the early Experimental Aircraft Association Fly-Ins. The homebuilt aircraft he saw there inspired him to design one himself. Remembering the Skycoach, he began the design of an all-aluminum two-place, side-by-side, pusher propeller aircraft. Construction began in February 1959. In October 1961, after 5,000 hours of construction, he first flew his aircraft, the Lesher Nomad (N1066Z) at Willow Run Airport in Ypsilanti, Michigan. A novel design feature was his use of a Dodge Flexidyne Coupling in the drive train to dampen torsional vibrations. The aircraft was powered by a 100 hp Continental O-200 engine driving a 72-inch Hartzell ground-adjustable propeller.

== Operational history ==
Lesher flew the Nomad to the 1962 EAA Fly-In in Rockford, Illinois, where the design attracted a lot of interest. In 1964, flying Nomad, he took the grand prize in the AC Spark Plug Rally. The aircraft was regularly flown until Lesher's death in 1998.

The aircraft is on display in the atrium of the Francois-Xavier Bagnoud building at the University of Michigan.

== Specifications ==
General characteristics

- Wingspan: 29 ft (8.8 m)
- Wing area: 86 sq ft (8.0 m^{2})
- Airfoil: NACA 23015
- Empty weight: 998 lb (453 kg)
- Gross weight: 1,485 lb (674 kg)
- Fuel capacity: 18
- Powerplant: 1 × Continental O-200A , 100 hp (75 kW)

Performance

- Cruise speed: 100 kn (120 mph, 190 km/h)
- Stall speed: 62 kn (71 mph, 115 km/h) Flaps down
- Range: 291 nmi (335 mi, 539 km)
- Service ceiling: 15,000 ft (4,600 m)

== See also ==
- Allenbaugh Grey Ghost
- Lesher Teal
- PAR Special
