= Edgar J. Lesher =

American aircraft designer (1914–1998)

- Born: July 31, 1914; Detroit, Michigan
- Died: May 19, 1998; Ann Arbor, Michigan
- Citizenship: United States
- Education: Ohio State University (BS, 1938), University of Michigan (MSE, 1940)
- Occupation: Aeronautical engineer
- Known for: Aircraft designer
- Spouse: Margaret Radebaugh
- Children: Ted, Karen, Roger & Nancy (twins), Sarah & Deborah (twins), Megan & Daniel (twins), Valerie & Gretchen (twins)

Edgar J. Lesher (July 31, 1914 – May 19, 1998) was an American aircraft designer, pilot and a professor of aerospace engineering.

== Early life ==
Ed Lesher was born in Detroit, Michigan. A self-described "airport bum", he took his first ride in an airplane at age 13, shortly after Charles Lindbergh's landmark flight across the Atlantic Ocean. Growing up in Columbus, Ohio, he was forced to delay college entrance due to the Great Depression. He eventually entered Ohio State University, where he earned a degree in mathematics. He remained at OSU, doing graduate studies of mathematics and physics. Transferring to the University of Michigan, he earned a master's degree in aeronautical engineering in 1940.

== Career ==
After finishing graduate school, Lesher went to work at Douglas Aircraft in Santa Monica, California. There, he worked as a stress analyst on the Douglas C-54 and Douglas A-20 programs. Preferring a university career, in 1941 he accepted a job at Texas A&M College. There, he taught ground school for the Civilian Pilot Training Program and earned his pilot's license. The next year, he returned to the University of Michigan as a faculty member in the aeronautical engineering department.

In 1945, he took a leave of absence and worked at Stinson Aircraft Company in Wayne, Michigan. At Stinson, he worked on the Stinson L-5 Sentinel, Stinson L-13 and the Stinson 106 Skycoach. The Skycoach was a four-place aircraft with a pusher propeller, a configuration which captured Lesher's imagination. He returned to teaching at the University of Michigan after this. In 1952 he took another leave of absence and spent 15 months working at Convair in San Diego California. Again, he returned to the University of Michigan, where he assisted in wind tunnel projects and did structural consulting in addition to his teaching responsibilities. Beginning in 1962, he began working at the Willow Run Laboratories of the University of Michigan.

In August 1958, he attended one of the early Experimental Aircraft Association fly-ins. The homebuilt aircraft he saw there inspired him to design one himself. Remembering the Skycoach, he began the design of an all-aluminum two-place, side-by-side, pusher propeller aircraft. Construction began in February 1959. In October 1961, after 5,000 hours of construction, he first flew his aircraft, the Lesher Nomad (N1066Z) at Willow Run Airport in Ypsilanti, Michigan. A novel design feature was his use of a Dodge Flexidyne Coupling in the drive train to dampen torsional vibrations. The aircraft was powered by a 100 hp Continental O-200 engine driving a 72-inch Hartzell ground-adjustable propeller. He flew the Nomad to the 1962 EAA Fly-In in Rockford, Illinois, where the design attracted a lot of interest. In 1964, flying Nomad, he took the grand prize in the AC Spark Plug Rally.

After returning home, he began looking into the existing FAI records and realized that he could design an aircraft to break the altitude, speed and distance records of Class C1a (propeller) for aircraft below 1,102 lbs gross weight. He began work on the design, and in October 1962 he started construction on what was to become the Lesher Teal (N4291C). The aircraft was configured as an all-aluminum single-place aircraft, powered by a 100 hp Continental O-200 engine driving a 64-inch Hartzell ground-adjustable propeller. By April 28, 1965, the airframe was complete. On that day, Lesher made the aircraft's first flight at Willow Run Airport. That August, he flew Teal to the 1965 EAA Fly-In in Rockford, Illinois, where he won an award from the EAA for his achievements.

After two years of testing Teal, on May 22, 1967, he flew the aircraft to a new 500 km closed-course Class C1a speed record of 181.55 mph. On June 30, he set a new 1,000 km closed-course speed record of 169.20 mph and on October 20, he set a new 2,000 km closed-course speed record of 141.84 mph.

On May 6, 1968, while flying Teal near Ann Arbor, he experienced a loss of power. Not being able to make it to a nearby airport, he made an emergency landing in a field. The airplane was badly damaged, but he was unhurt. After rebuilding Teal, on September 9, 1970, he set a new Class C1a closed-circuit distance record of 1554.29 miles. Later, on September 29, 1973, he set a new Class C1a 3 km speed record of 173.101 mph and the next day he set a new 15–25 km speed record of 169.134 mph. Finally, on July 2, 1975, he set a new Class C1a record for distance in a straight line by flying 1,835.459, flying from Florida to Arizona. He continued to fly Teal for many more years, but never made any more record attempts. For his record-breaking flights, he won the FAI's Louis Bleriot Medal four times and was inducted in the Michigan Aviation Hall of Fame in 1988.

In 1978, he began construction of a larger aircraft, "Nene", which he hoped to break the FAI Class C1b records. However, the aircraft was not completed. He retired from the University of Michigan in 1985.

The Teal was donated to the EAA Airventure Museum in 2002.

== Other activities ==
Lesher was involved with the Ann Arbor Civic Theater as a set designer and actor and sang in the Ann Arbor Civic Chorus.
