= Cessna 140 =

Single engine light airplane

Cessna 120 & 140
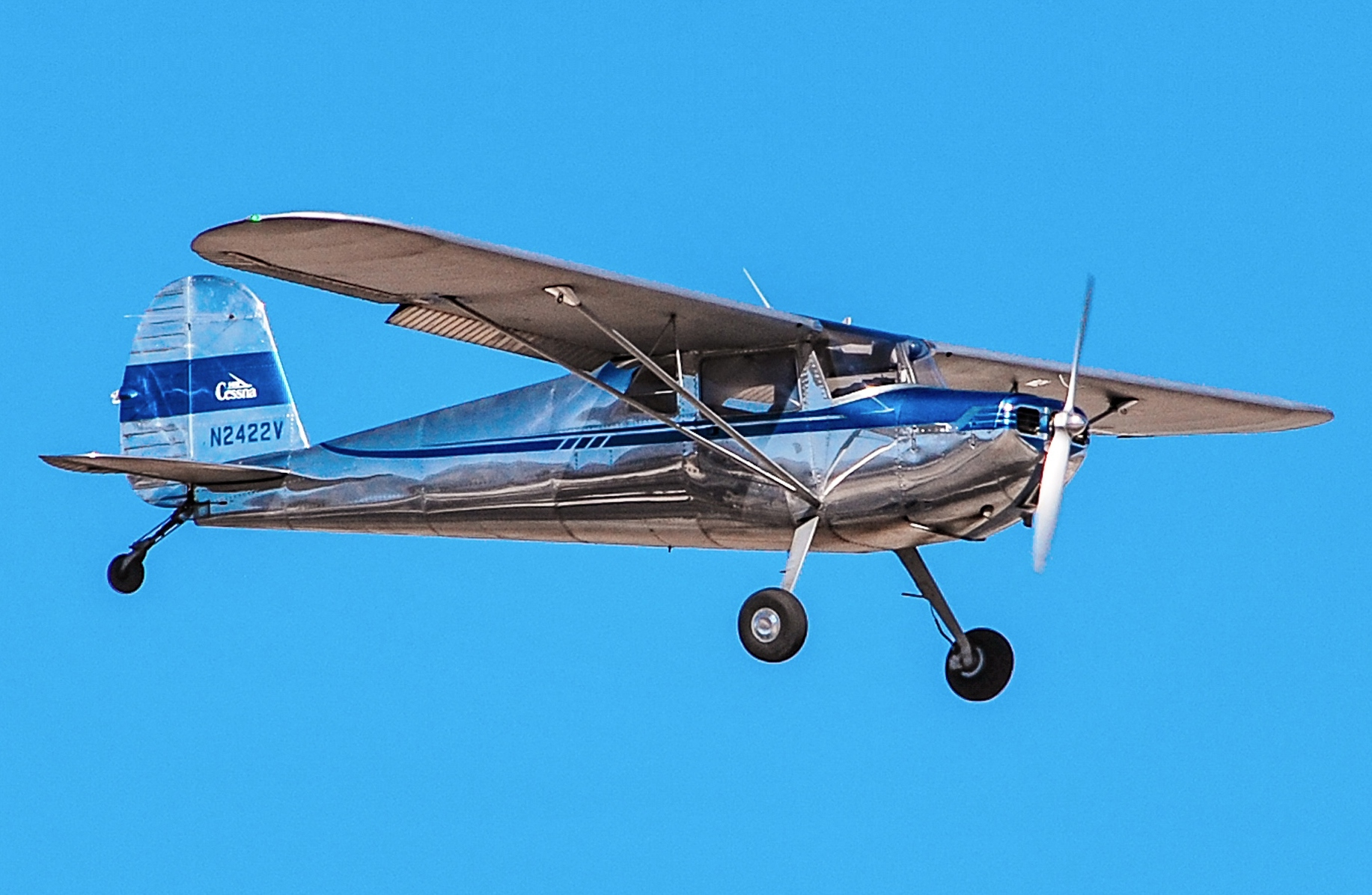
- Cessna 140

General information
- Type: Light utility aircraft
- Manufacturer: Cessna Aircraft Company
- Number built: 7,664

History
- Manufactured: 1946–1951
- Introduction date: 1946
- First flight: June 28, 1945 (140); 1946 (120)

The Cessna 120, 140, and 140A, are single-engine, two-seat, conventional landing gear (tailwheel), light general aviation aircraft that were first produced in 1946, immediately following the end of World War II. Production ended in 1951, and was succeeded in 1959 by the Cessna 150, a similar two-seat trainer which introduced tricycle gear. Combined production of the 120, 140, and 140A was 7,664 units in five years.

== Development ==
=== Cessna 140 ===
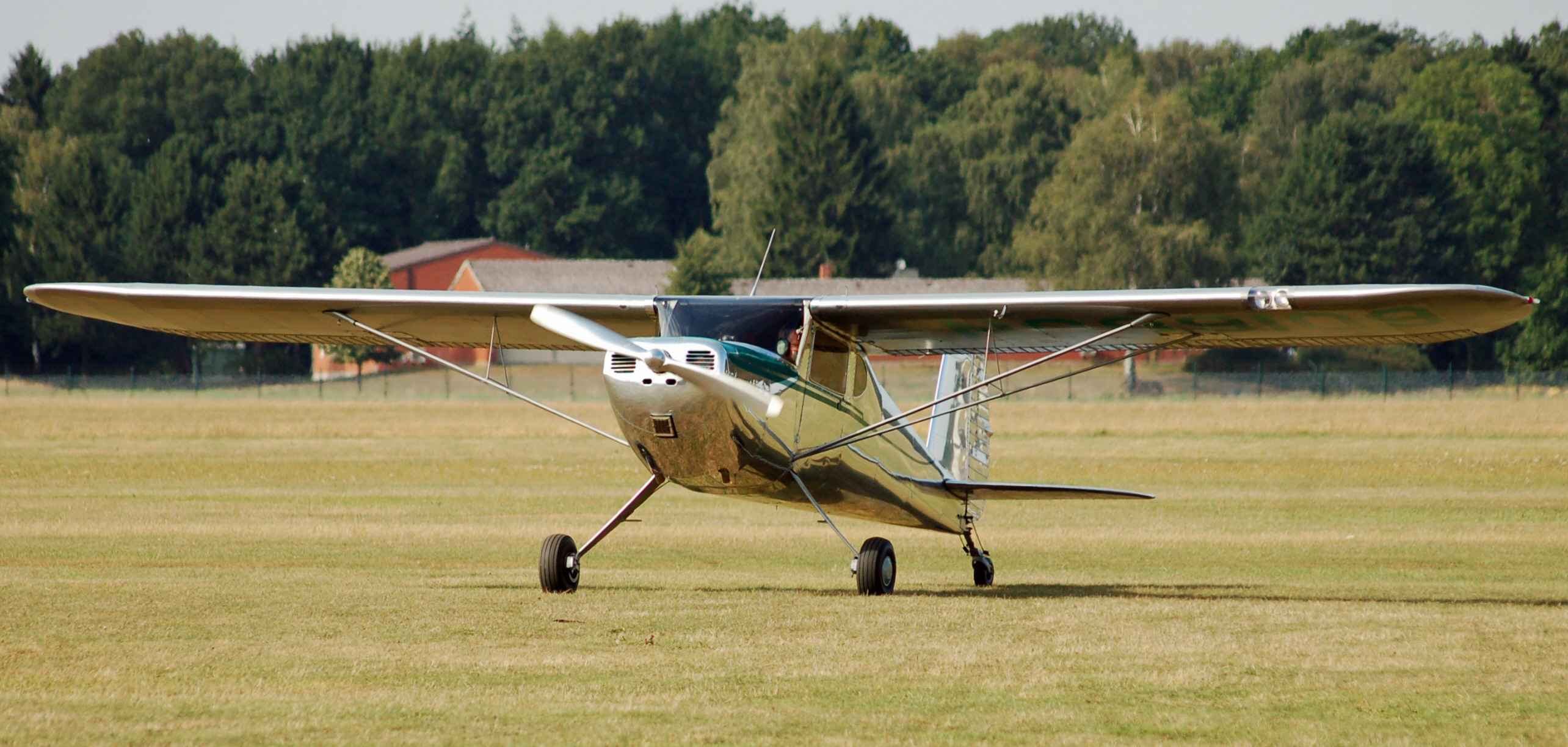
Cessna 140 taxiing

The Cessna 140 was originally equipped with a Continental C-85-12 or C-85-12F horizontally opposed, air-cooled, four-cylinder piston engine of 85 hp (63 kW). The Continental C-90-12F or C-90-14F of 90 hp (67 kW) was optional, as was the 108 hp (81 kW) Lycoming O-235-C1 engine, an aftermarket installation authorized in the type certificate. This model had a metal fuselage and fabric wings with metal control surfaces. The Cessna 170 was a larger four-seat development of the 140, sporting a more powerful engine.

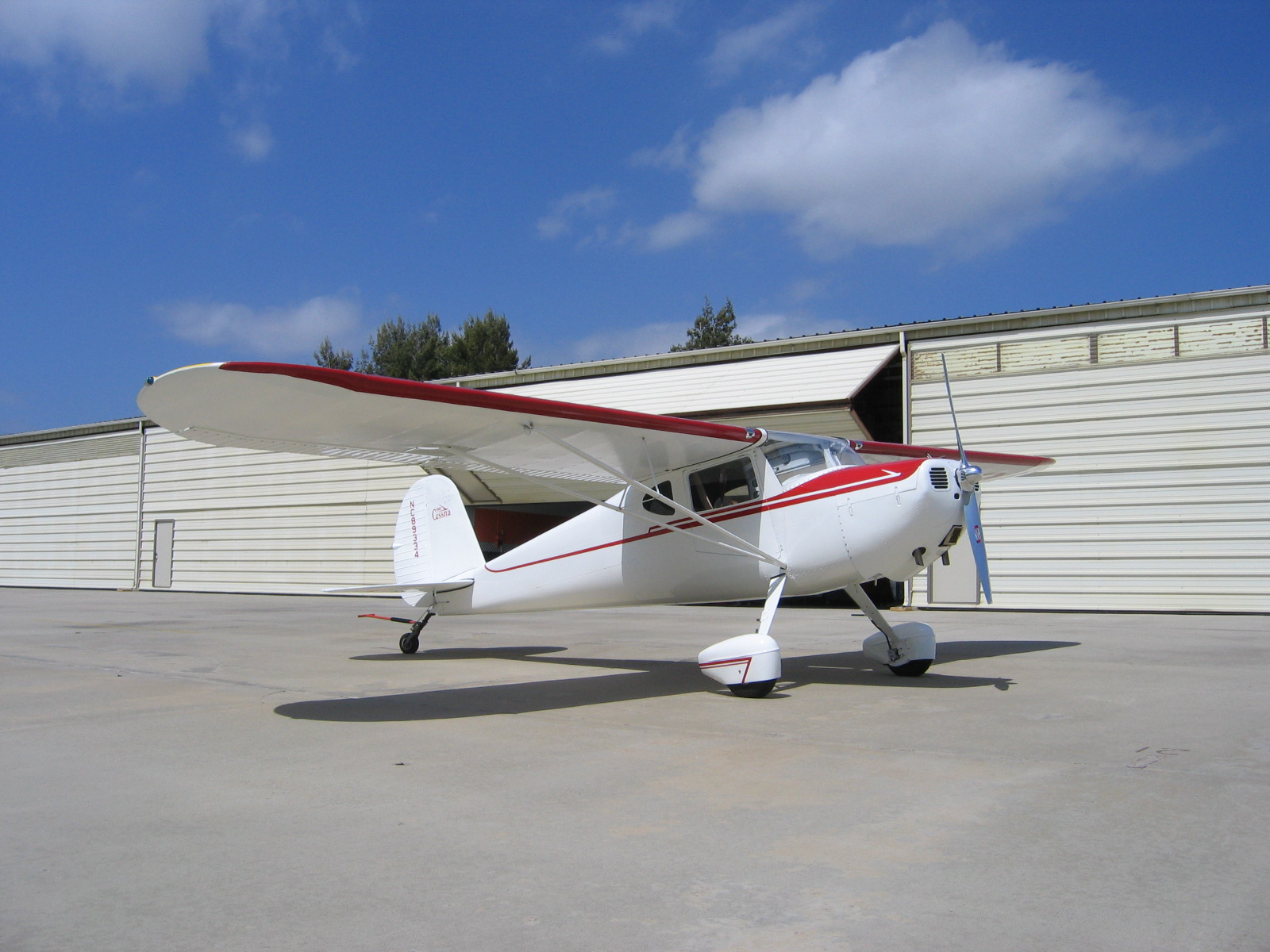
Restored 1946 Cessna 140

=== Cessna 120 ===
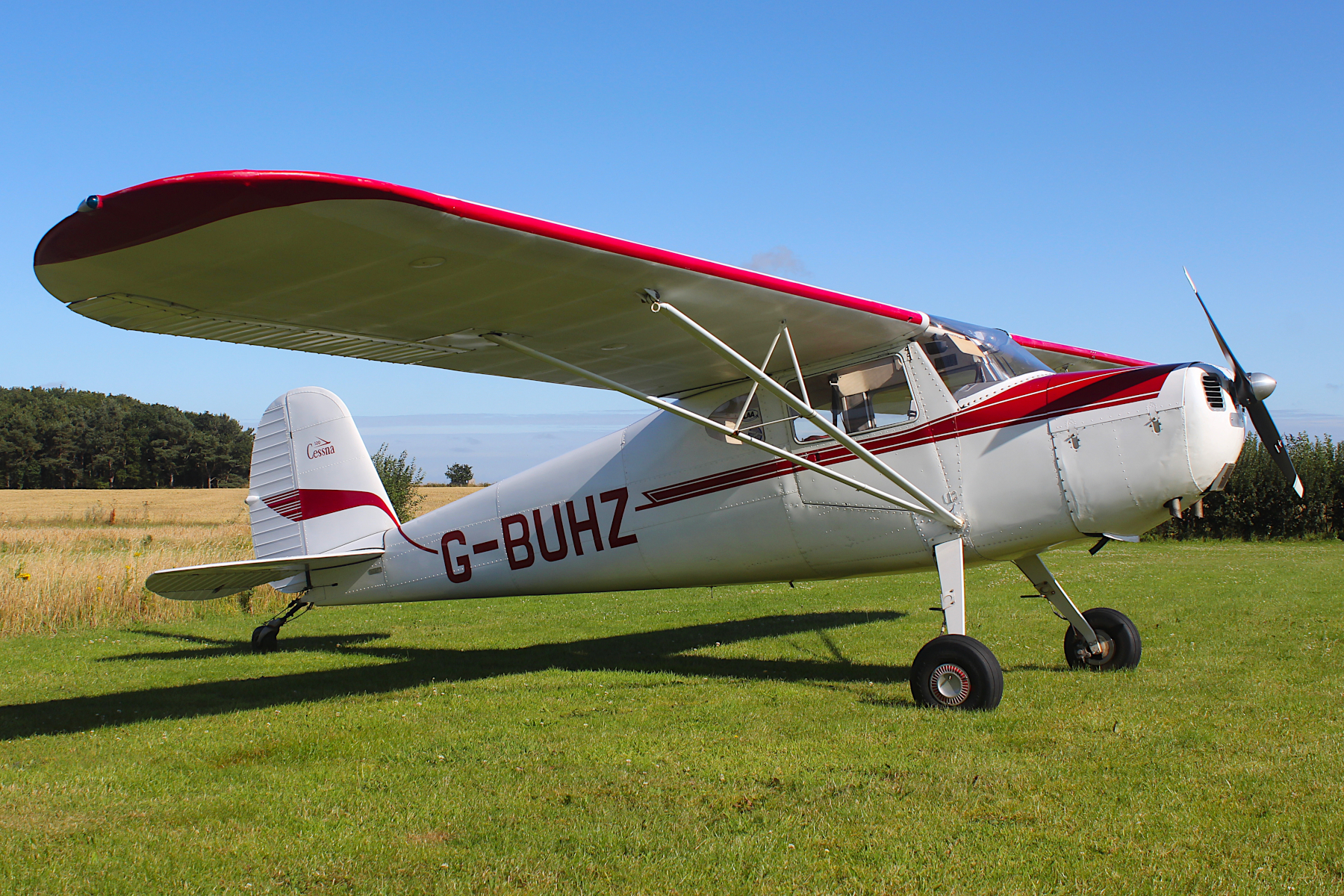
Cessna 120, built 1948, showing the smooth underside of the inboard wing, without flaps.

The Cessna 120 was an economy version of the 140 produced at the same time. It had the same engine as the 140, but lacked wing flaps. The rear-cabin "D" side windows and electrical system (radios, lights, battery and starter) were optional. A 120 outfitted with every factory option would be nearly equivalent to a 140, but the International Cessna 120/140 Association believes that no 120s were originally built this way. Despite this, many decades' worth of owner-added options have rendered many 120s almost indistinguishable from a 140 aside from the absence of wing flaps. The 120 was dropped from production upon introduction of the 140A in 1949.

Two additional variants of the 120 were offered in May 1946; the 120A and 120B. The 120A would have been a 120 with co-pilot brakes a steerable tailwheel, while the 120B would have been a 120A but with a complete electrical system as standard equipment. No examples of the 120A or 120B are known to have been built.

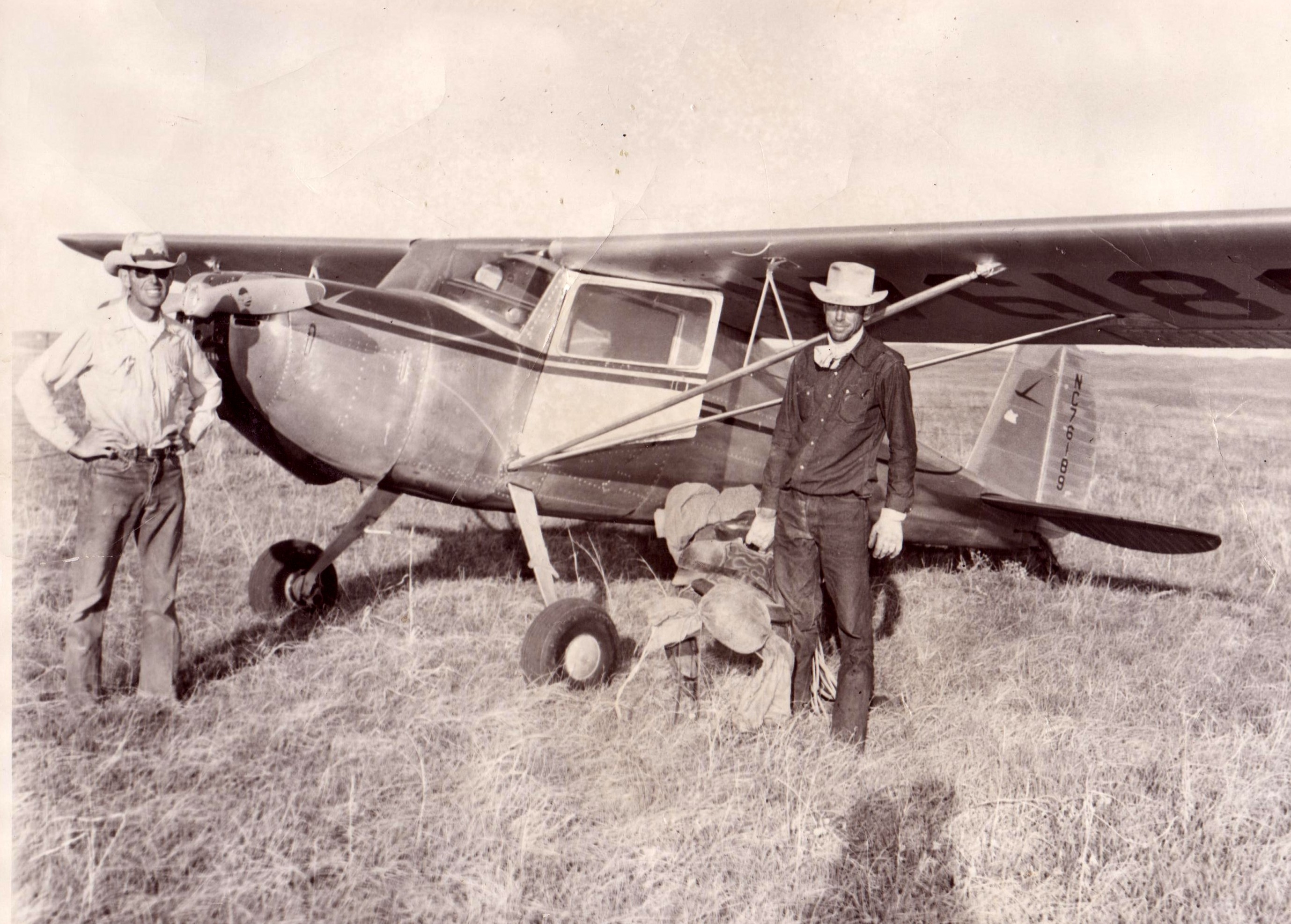
1946 Cessna 120, in Nebraska, 1964

=== Cessna 140A ===
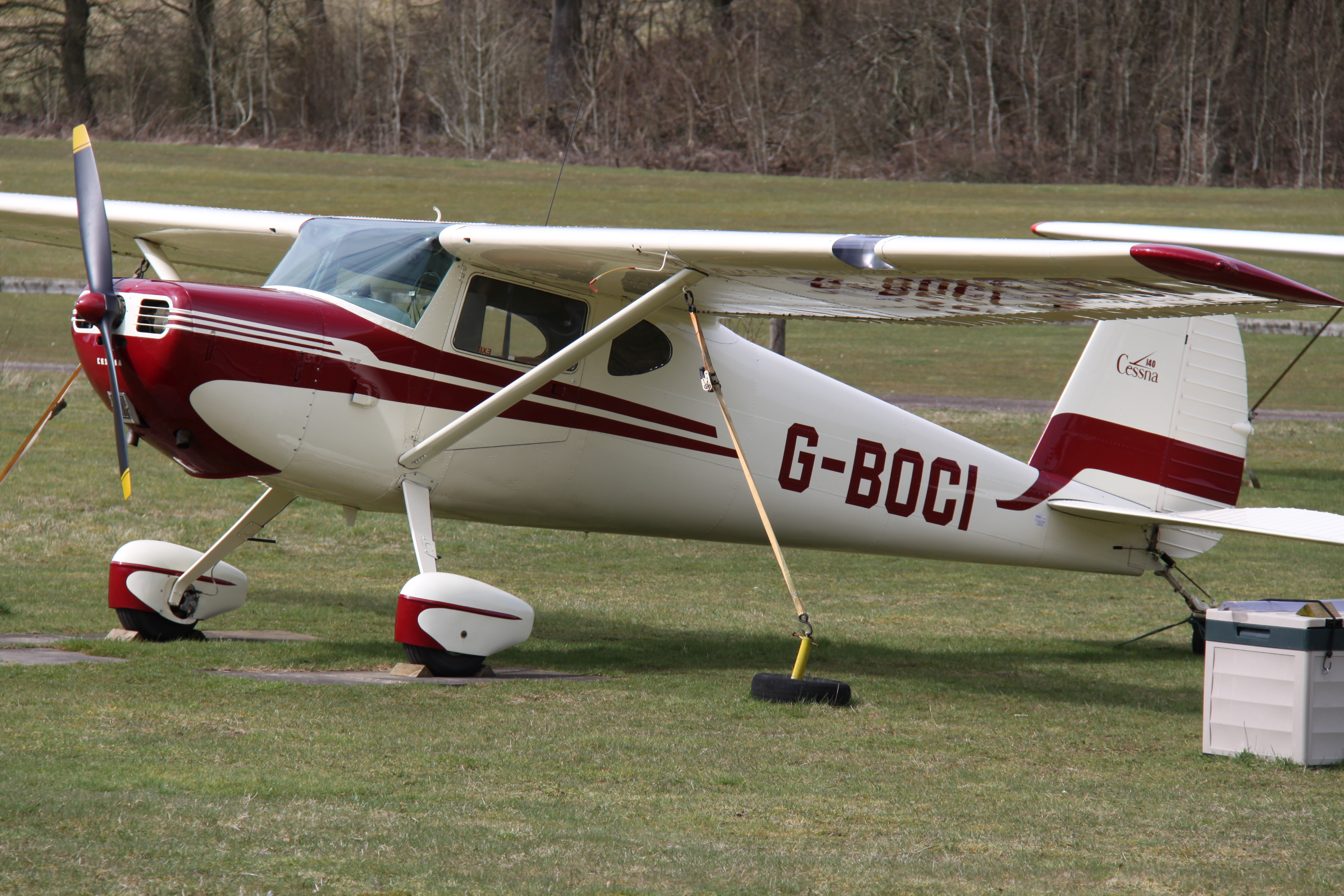
Cessna 140A with the single wing strut

In 1949, Cessna introduced the 140A, a new variant with aluminum-covered wings and single wing struts instead of the fabric wing covering, dual "V" struts, and jury struts fitted on earlier models. Standard engines were the Continental C-90-12F or C-90-14F of 90 hp (67 kW), with the 85 hp (63 kW) Continental C-85-12, C-85-12F, or C-85-14F engines optional. The spring-steel gear had been swept 3 in (8 cm) forward on 120 and 140 models in late 1947 so landing gear extenders were no longer necessary to counter nose-over tendencies during heavy application of brakes; all 140A models had the improved gear legs. Despite these improvements, sales of the 140 lineup faltered, and the 140A comprised only seven percent of overall 120/140 production.

== Modifications ==
Common modifications to the Cessna 120 and 140 include:

- "Metalized" wings, where the fabric is replaced with light-gauge sheet aluminum, eliminating the need to periodically replace the wing fabric.
- The installation of landing gear extenders to reduce the tendency of the aircraft to nose over on application of heavy braking. These were factory-optional equipment.
- Installation of rear-cabin "D" side windows on 120s that were not originally so equipped.
- Installation of electrical systems on 120s that were not originally so equipped, allowing owners to install an electric starter, more sophisticated avionics, or lights for night flying.
- Installation of a more powerful engine. A popular conversion today is to replace the original C-85 or C-90 with a 100 hp (75 kW) Continental O-200.

Three propellers with different pitches of the propeller blades were originally available on the Cessna 140A model, the standard propeller, a climb propeller, and a cruise propeller. A Cessna 140A with a Continental 100 HP O-200 and a cruise propellor could cruise past the larger, usually faster, Cessna 172.

A kit is available to install a Lycoming O-320 but this conversion is less prevalent due to a roughly 100 lb (45 kg) weight penalty and a sharp increase in fuel consumption.

== Operators ==
=== Military ===
Guatemala

- Guatemalan Air Force

Nicaragua

- Nicaraguan Air Force

== Specifications (Cessna 140) ==
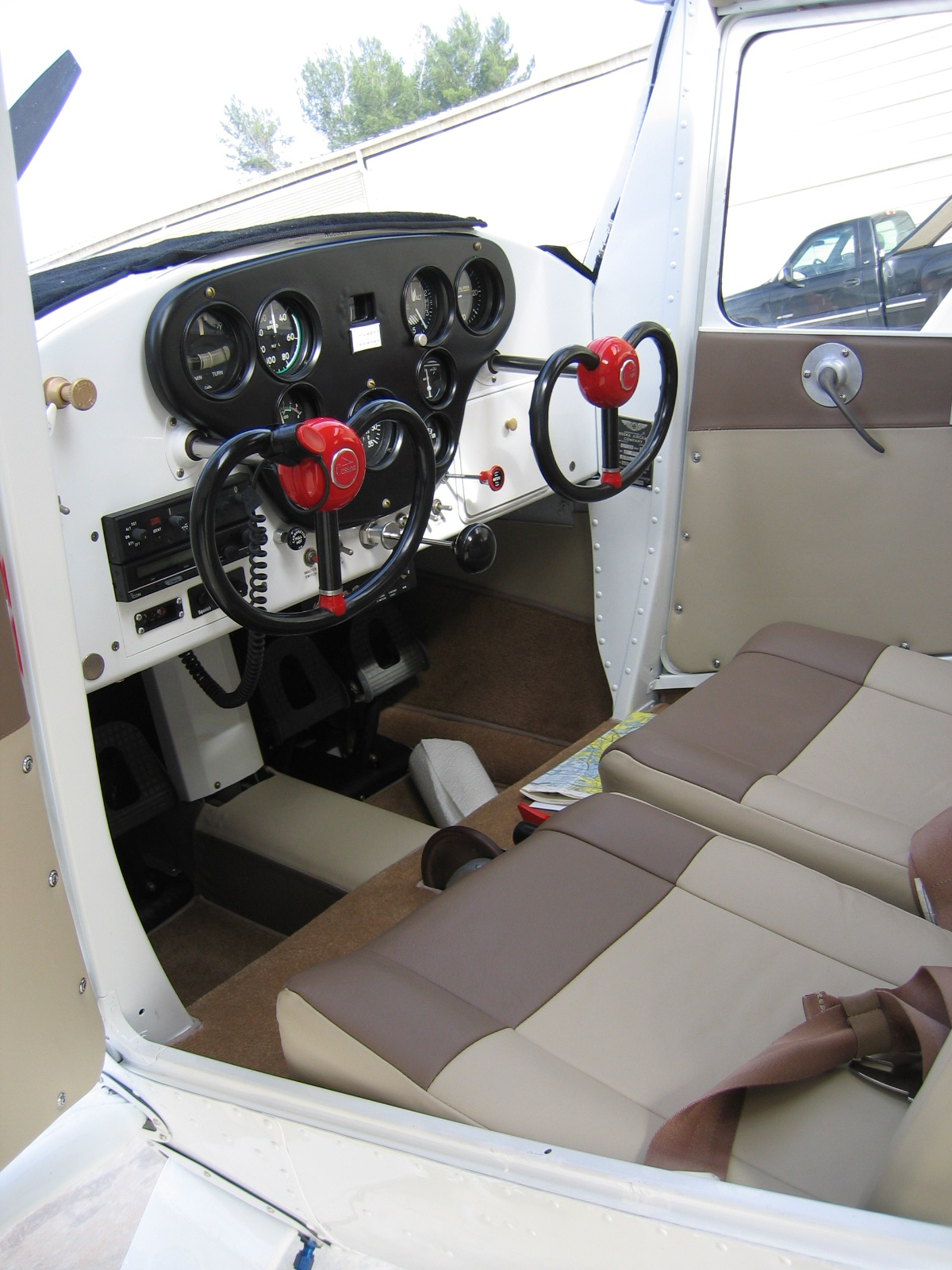
1946 Cessna 140 interior

Data from The Complete Guide to the Single-Engine Cessnas, AOPA Pilot, and Aircraft Specification No. A-768.

General characteristics

- Crew: one
- Capacity: one passenger
- Length: 21 ft 6 in (6.55 m)
- Wingspan: 33 ft 4 in (10.16 m)
- Height: 6 ft 3 in (1.91 m)
- Wing area: 159.3 sq ft (14.80 m^{2})
- Empty weight: 890 lb (404 kg)
- Gross weight: 1,450 lb (658 kg)
- Fuel capacity: 25 US gallons (95 liters), of which 21 US gallons (79.5 liters) are useable
- Powerplant: 1 × Continental C-85 four cylinder, four stroke, horizontally opposed aircraft engine, 85 hp (63 kW)
- Propellers: 2-bladed Sensenich

Performance

- Maximum speed: 125 mph (201 km/h, 109 kn)
- Cruise speed: 105 mph (169 km/h, 91 kn)
- Stall speed: 45 mph (72 km/h, 39 kn) flaps down
- Never exceed speed: 140 mph (230 km/h, 120 kn)
- Range: 450 mi (720 km, 390 nmi)
- Service ceiling: 15,500 ft (4,700 m)
- Rate of climb: 680 ft/min (3.5 m/s)
- Wing loading: 9.1 lb/sq ft (44 kg/m^{2})

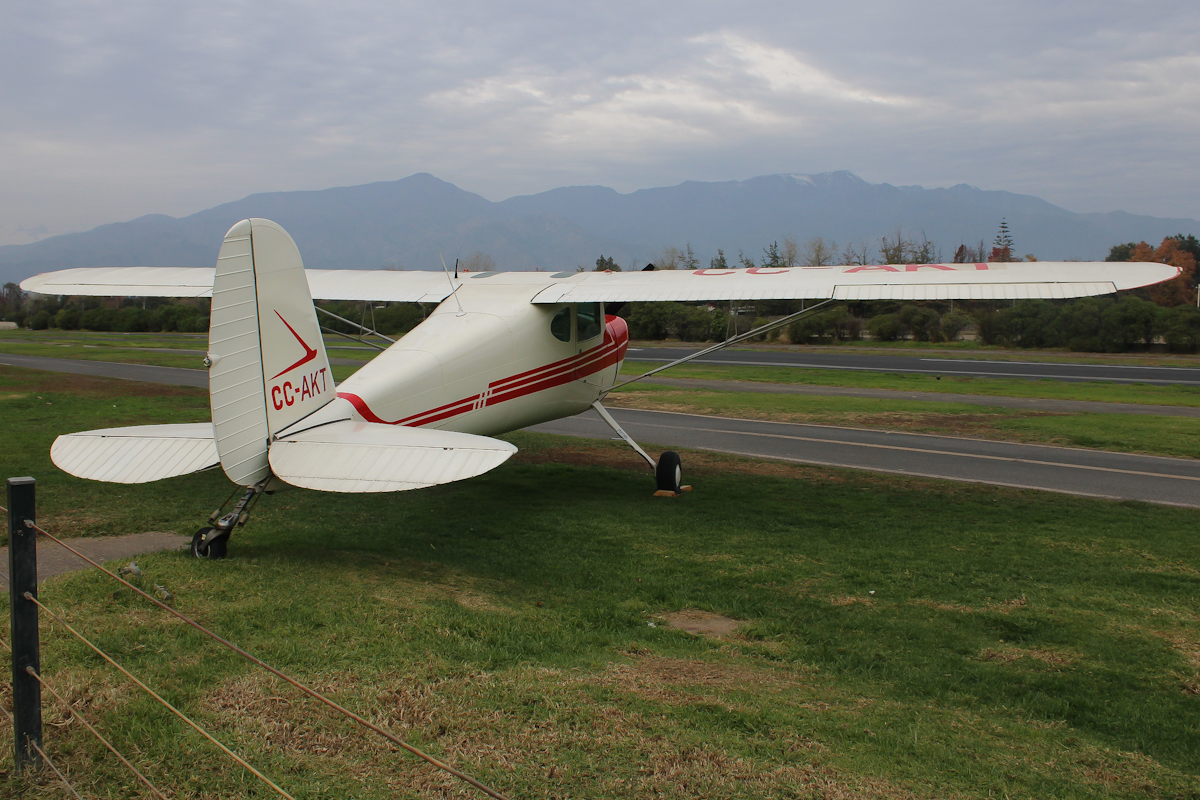
View (from behind) of a Cessna 140.

== See also ==
- 1945 in aviation (first flight)

Related development

- Cessna 150
- Cessna 170

Aircraft of comparable role, configuration, and era

- Aeronca Chief
- ERCO Ercoupe
- Fleet Canuck
- Luscombe 8
- Taylorcraft B
- Piper Vagabond
