= Dean Delt-Air 250 =

American homebuilt aircraft

Delt-Air 250

General information
- Type: Delta-wing homebuilt aircraft
- National origin: United States
- Designer: Herbert Dean
- Status: Destroyed
- Number built: 1

History
- First flight: 8 November 1961

The Dean Delt-Air 250 was an American twin-seat amateur-built, delta wing light aircraft. Designed and built by Herbert Dean of Flint, Michigan, the aircraft was destroyed on its first flight and Dean was killed.

== Design and development ==
The Delt-Air was a single-engined all-metal light aircraft powered by a 180 hp (134 kW) Lycoming O-360 engine mounted at the rear driving a pusher propeller. It had a tricycle landing gear and rear-hinged canopy for access to the tandem cockpit. Registered N6379T it was destroyed during its first flight on 8 November 1961 and the designer killed.

== Specifications ==
Data from Flight International January 1962

General characteristics

- Length: 25 ft 3 in (7.70 m)
- Wingspan: 16 ft 3 in (4.95 m)
- Gross weight: 1,460 lb (662 kg)
- Powerplant: 1 × Lycoming O-360 four-cylinder, direct-drive, horizontally opposed, air-cooled, piston aircraft engine, 180 hp (130 kW)
- Propellers: 2-bladed

Performance

- Maximum speed: 240 mph (390 km/h, 210 kn) estimated
