= Bushby (surname) =

Bushby is an English surname. Notable people with the surname include:

- Adrian Bushby (active 21st century), British recording engineer
- Aisha Bushby (born 1991), children's writer
- Bill Bushby (born 1935), English cricketer
- Bill Bushby (footballer) (1914–1997), English footballer
- David Bushby (born 1965), Australian diplomat
- Edward Bushby (1817–1856), English cricketer
- Karl Bushby (born 1969), British ex-paratrooper, walker and author
- Max Bushby (1927–1994), Australian politician
- Michael Bushby (1931–2020), English cricketer
- Perc Bushby (1919–1975), Australian rules footballer
- Robert Bushby (1927–2018), American aircraft mechanic and aviator
- Thomas Bushby (1911–1983), American football player
- William Bushby (1864–1936), Australian rules footballer

== Other uses ==
- Anthony Bushby Bacon (1772–1827), British industrialist
- Margaret Bushby Lascelles Cockburn (1829–1928), Indian-born artist and amateur ornithologist

== See also ==
- Busby (surname)
- Bushby Midget Mustang, a light aircraft
- Bushby Mustang II, a light aircraft
