= Busby (surname) =

Busby is the surname of the following notable people:

- Adam Busby (born 1948), Scottish terrorist
- Alan T. Busby (1895–1992), American educator
- Alexander Busby (politician) (1808–1873), English-born Australian politician
- Allen Busby (1900–1988), American politician
- Amy Busby (1872–1957), American actress
- Brian Busby (born 1962), Canadian literary historian and anthologist
- Buzz Busby (1933–2003), stage name of American bluegrass musician Bernarr Graham Busbice
- Cathy Busby, Canadian artist
- Cathy Busby (geologist), American geologist
- Charles Busby (architect) (1786–1834), British architect
- Charles Busby (politician) (born 1963), American engineer and politician
- Christopher Busby (born 1945), British scientist
- Chris Busby (rugby union), Irish rugby referee
- Cindy Busby (born 1983), Canadian actress
- Cylin Busby, American writer
- Dean Busby (born 1973), rugby player
- Drew Busby (1947–2022), Scottish footballer
- Duncan Busby (born 1983), English archer
- Eileen Rose Busby (1922–2005), American author and antiques expert
- F. M. Busby (1921–2005), American science fiction author
- Francine Busby (born 1951), American politician
- Gerald Busby (born 1935), American composer
- George H. Busby (1794–1869), American politician
- Hector Busby (1932–2019), Māori navigator and shipbuilder in New Zealand
- Horace Busby (1924–2000), American journalist
- James Busby (1801–1871), key figure in colonial New Zealand law and independence, pioneer of the Australian wine industry, son of John
- T. Jeff Busby (1884–1964), American politician
- Jheryl Busby (1949–2008), American recording company executive
- Jim Busby (1927–1996), American baseball player
- Jodean Rowan Busby (1932–2010), American actress, wife of Tony Russel and mother of Del Russel
- John Busby (1765–1857), Australian mining engineer
- Karen Busby (born 1958), Canadian feminist legal scholar
- Kathryn Busby, American television and film executive
- Lee Busby (born 1956 or 1957), American military officer, politician, businessman and sculptor
- Luke Busby (born 1981), British music producer and songwriter, son of Sid Busby
- Margaret Busby (born 1940s), Ghanaian publisher, editor, writer and broadcaster based in the UK
- Mark Busby (1945–2025), American academic, novelist and writer
- Matt Busby (1909–1994), Scottish football player and manager
- Mike Busby (born 1972), baseball player
- Morris D. Busby (born 1938), American diplomat
- Paul Busby (1918–2003), American baseball player
- R. A. Busby, American author
- Richard Busby (1606–1695), English Anglican clergyman and headmaster
- Rick Busby, American gospel singer
- Sherrill Busby (1914–1960), American football player
- Siân Busby (1960–2012), British writer
- Stephen Busby, British biochemist and professor
- Steve Busby (born 1949), American baseball player
- Thad Busby (born 1974), American football player
- Thomas Busby (disambiguation)
- Tom Busby (1936–2003), Canadian actor
- Viv Busby (1949–2024), British football player and manager
- William Busby (priest) (1757–1820), Anglican Dean of Rochester
- William Busby (politician) (1813–1887), English-born Australian politician

== See also ==
- Bushby (surname)
