= Bert Wilcut =

American Aircraft designer

Bert Edward Wilcut
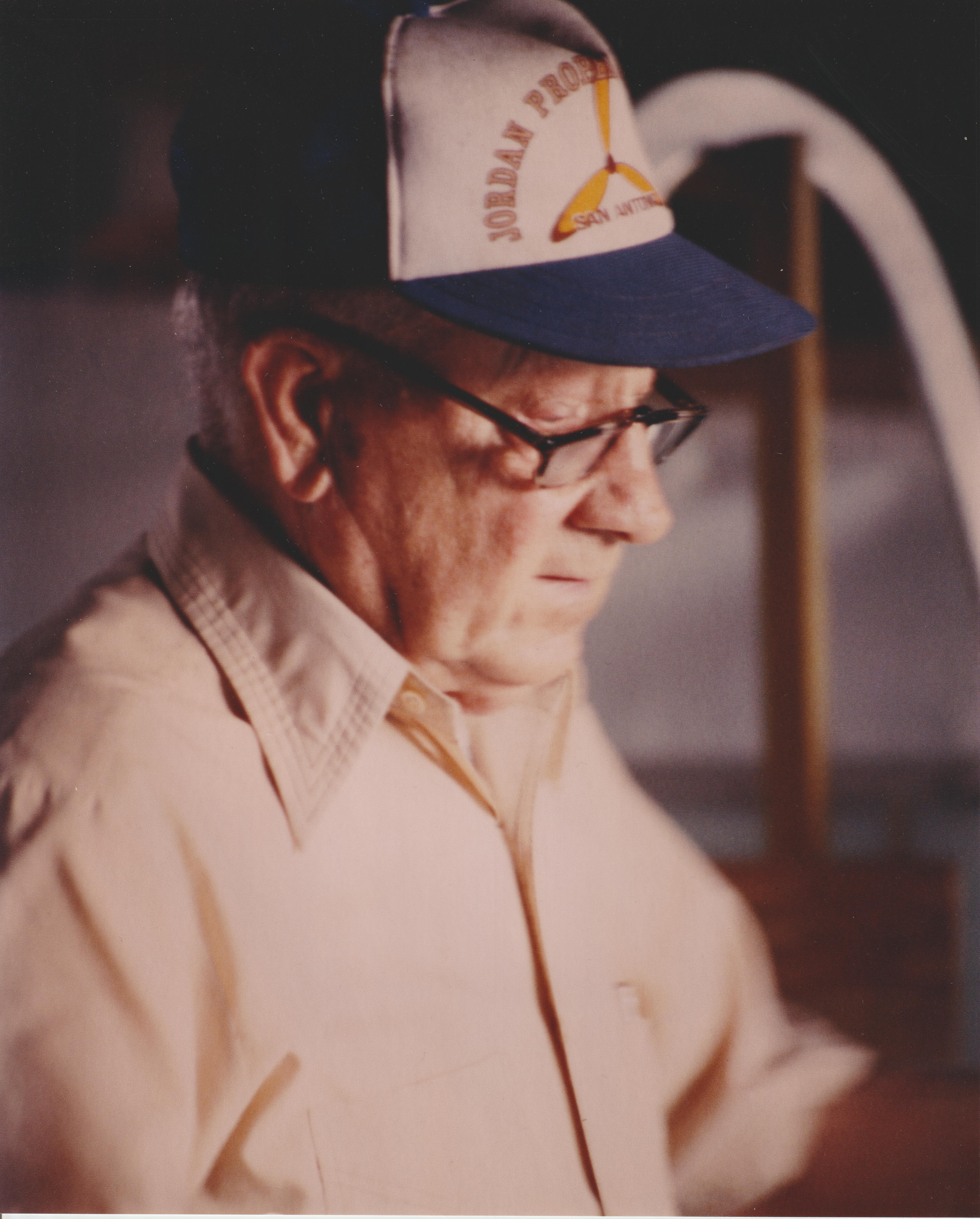
- Born: November 18, 1901; Woodbury, Iowa, US
- Died: February 12, 2001 (aged 99); San Antonio, Texas, US
- Occupations: Primary Flight instructor U.S. Army Air Corps, Owner of aircraft manufacturing companies
- Years active: 1927–1988
- Known for: Founder of San Antonio Aviation modifying the Midget Mustang and creating the Palomino (aircraft)

Bert Edward Wilcut (November 18, 1901 – February 12, 2001) was a 1928 American congressional appointed aviation cadet, a World War II veteran, and is best known for upgrading the Midget Mustang and creating its third generation, the Palomino.

== Early life ==
Bert Wilcut was born to his father, Rasmer Dupree Wilcut, and to his mother, Iva Evelyn Shannon. They lived in Sloan Township, Woodbury, Iowa, until 1915, when they moved to Liberty Township, Woodbury, Iowa.

In 1928, Wilcut moved to Texas where he attended the Southwest Texas State Teachers College in San Marcos, Texas. While attending, he worked for the college's weekly newspaper named The College Star. He was the paper's Business Manager in the Editorial Staff Department. After graduation, Wilcut taught Mathematics and Science at Alamo Heights Junior High School.

== Career ==
In 1928, Bert Wilcut received a congressional appointment as a military aviation cadet, and learned to fly at Brooks Field in San Antonio, Texas in a Consolidated PT-1 aircraft. He graduated two classes after Charles Lindbergh. One of Wilcut's flight instructors was Claire Lee Chennault.

In 1934, Wilcut sold used cars on a downtown, Broadway Street location in San Antonio, Texas.

In 1939, with the help of Thurman Berret, Wilcut developed land near Gillespie Boulevard and Palo Alto Road (in San Antonio, Texas) into a plane factory for the National Aircraft Corporation. He also operated this flying field to include a flying school on this site. His operation was called "Wilcut Aeronautics." He provided airplane storages, repairs and maintenance facilities, along with a dealership for new and used planes. This airport would later become known as Bexar County Airport.

The year after, in July 1940, Wilcut earned his civilian pilot's license from Royal A. Woodchick, operator of Chuck's Flying Service.

In 1941, Wilcut and his Wilcut Aeronautics had to be abandoned because he was assigned to Randolph Field for U.S. Army Air Corps Flight Instructor training.

=== World War II ===
Wilcut served as a primary flight instructor at Army Air Corps Basic Training Field in Ballinger, Texas. At this time, Stinson Field (now known as Stinson Municipal Airport) was being used by the Army Air Corps for Aircrew training on twin engine aircraft and Hangar #10 was the main repair facility.

=== After WW II ===
In 1945, Wilcut went to work as a Certified Flight Instructor at the Leon Valley, Texas airport. In 1946, the U.S. Army gave Stinson Field back to the City of San Antonio and Wilcut had the opportunity to acquire Hangar #10. Here he started his second company, San Antonio Aviation.

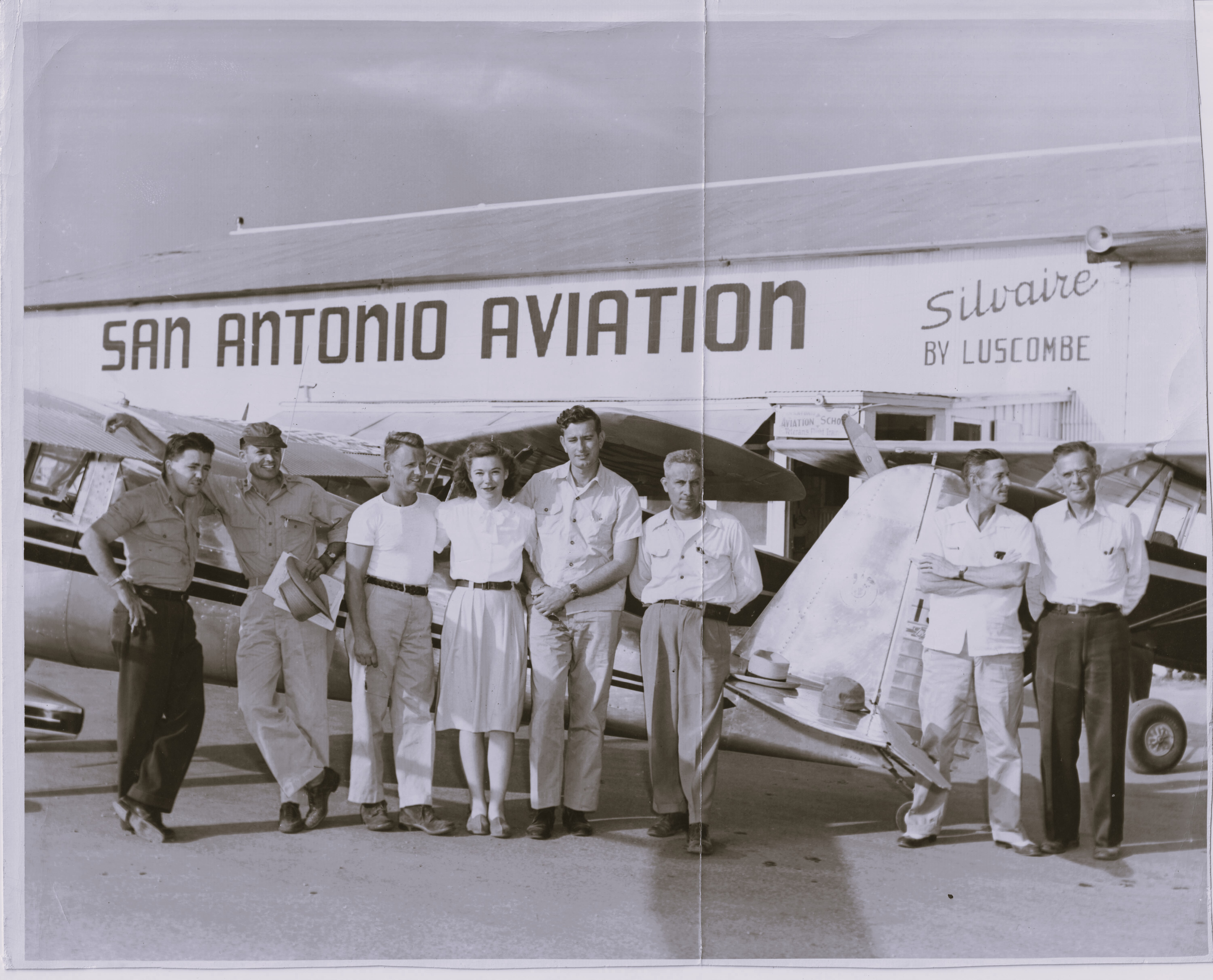
San Antonio Aviation founded by Bert Wilcut

The business expanded rapidly after the GI Bill was established. Large numbers of former servicemen, denied the opportunity to fly during the war, then took advantage of the GI bill to obtain pilot training. He offered flight instruction courses from Private Pilot to Multi-engine Instrument Airline Transport ratings. He started the first school for Aircraft and Powerplant Mechanics in the South Texas area. The overall enrollment of his aviation schools exceeded 2,000 students.

November 1949 saw an expansion of aircraft dealership on Stinson Field. Lloyd Brown, of Brown Flying Service, South Texas distributor for Piper-Stinson aircraft delivers the first Piper PA-16 Clipper to Bert Wilcut owner of San Antonio Aviation. The Clipper is a family type aircraft that cruises at 112 miles per hour and can safely land and take off from small restricted areas. Its list for under $3000. Wilcut also offered Piper PA-15 Vagabond for $1995 and up to the Stinson 108 "Flying Station Wagon" for $6484. The PA-11 Trainer and PA-14 were also for sale.

In 1950, Wilcut offered the only Texas course in crop dusting provided by his San Antonio Aviation school. His flight school used a specially designed crop-dusting plane for giving dual instructions to crop dusting pilots under actual dusting conditions. He said that opportunities are many for pilots since dusting, spraying and fertilizing is rapidly seen to be a great benefit to the famers. The training is recognized by the department of agriculture, civil aeronautics administration and state approved agencies as being very essential.

== Taylorcraft TG-6 ==
In 1946, a surplus Taylorcraft TG-6, a World War II assault training glider, was sold by Fritz Schmidt to Wilcut, then the owner and operator of the San Antonio Flying School. Wilcut converted the glider by adding a powered engine and removed the wing spoilers. He flew it until 1950 when it was involved in an accident. The plane sat unrepaired until 1960 when he sold it. This TG-6 last known location was in June 1982 during a Fly-In sponsor by the Experimental Aircraft Association event held in Oskaloosa, Iowa airport.

== Midget Mustang ==
In the early 1950s, Wilcut purchased the manufacturing rights and tooling for the “Long Midget” from the widow of deceased design engineer David Long, of Piper Aircraft. This aircraft had been built especially to compete in pylon racing. He changed the name to Midget Mustang because it looked like the WWII North American P-51 fighter aircraft. He acquired a block of registration numbers from the FAA (N35J-N45J) and began manufacturing the aircraft for sale.

The intent was to build kits to sell and ship anywhere in the world. After several of the Midget Mustangs had been built, sold, and licensed as amateur-built aircraft, the FAA stepped in and advised that less than 50 percent of the construction work was required by the purchaser and that further production of the aircraft would require Type Certification. Because of a shortage of capital required to do this, production of the Midget Mustang was stopped and the remaining two aircraft on hand were sold to residents of Latin American countries. Wilcut then sold the manufacturing rights to Robert Bushby.

== Palomino ==
After selling the rights to the Midget Mustang, Wilcut wanted a to build a compact private airplane with speed, efficiency, and a moderate selling price. The aircraft is called the Palomino. By October 1962, Wilcut had many of the engineering plans approved by Federal Aviation Agency (FAA term used in the 1960s) for the new, all-metal "utility sport" plane. He estimated that he would hire 150 men to manufacture three Palominos a week in his Stinson Field factory, making it the only aircraft plant in San Antonio, Texas, where a plane is built from scratch. The idea of the Palomino started in September 1958 and Wilcut spent so far $107,000.00 ($1,125,523.08 today's year 2025 cost) on its production.

The Palomino is a two-place, tandem seating, low wing monoplane powered by a 140-horsepowered engine. Its empty weight is 960 pounds and has gross capacity of 1,500 pounds. Fuel capacity is 27 gallons and it has a flying range of 600 miles. Cruise is estimated to be 150 miles per hour and the aircraft would be available in the $6,000 price range.

The Designated Engineering Representative (DER's) for the Palomino were: Hal Cronkhite, the Chief Design Engineer for Ted Smith on the original Aero Commander; Dick Kraft, formerly with Swearingen Aircraft, one of the engineers working on the Merlin and the Metro aircraft (known today as Fairchild Swearingen Metroliner); John Taylor, formerly Chief Engineer of the Mooney M20 series; and Art Mooney, formerly of Mooney Aircraft, who contributed in the design of the control system and landing gear retraction system.

Upon the completion of the first Palomino, the engineering certification for the FAA Type Certification had exceeded $325,000.00 (equivalent in purchasing power to about $3,487,941.72 in today's year 2025 amount). By the time the second aircraft was under construction, the FAA required additional engineering certifications on the Fatigue Life (a.k.a. Fatigue (material)) of the metal skin of the Palomino. It was estimated that this new engineering cost would exceed an additional $225,000.00 (1960 cost).

The attempts to market the Palomino as an amateur-built aircraft hit too high of a cost and made the project not affordable. The project was scrapped. The first Palomino (The FAA registry's N-Number on this Palomino is unknown) was sold as an Experimental to a retired U.S. Navy Commander in Bremerton, Washington, and the second aircraft (FAA N-number unknown) was sold along with the Engineering, Tooling, and Manufacturing rights to Allen J. Pratka of Pleasanton, Texas.

== Consolidated PT-3 ==
In early 1967, Wilcut received the grand champion, best open biplane, and most outstanding antique aircraft awards during the Arlington, Texas fly-in for his restored PT-3.

On August 15, 1967, at Brooks Air Force Base over Hangar 9 (landmark), Wilcut flew his restored 1927 PT-3 over the crowds gather to celebrate an historic event. Hangar 9 was receiving its Historic Landmark plaque. The hangar will become a museum highlighting aircraft and other items of the 1917-1927 era.

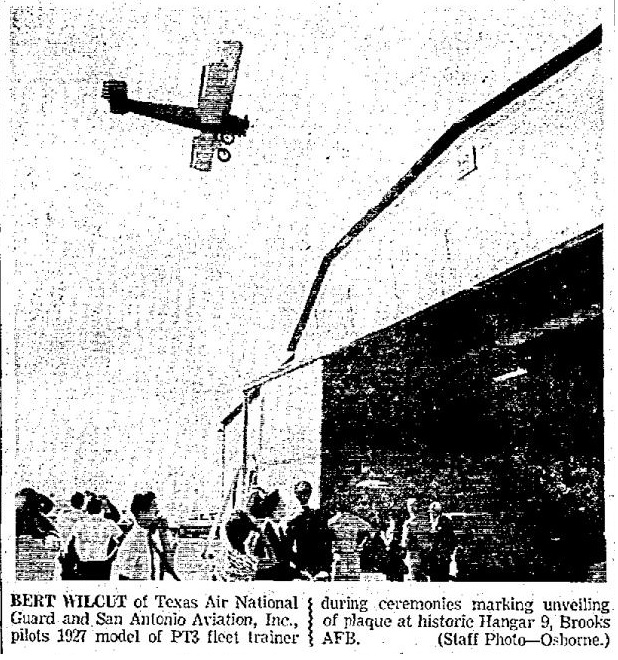
Bert Wilcut flies his Consolidated PT-3 over Brooks AFB

== Retirement ==
In the early 1980s, Wilcut decided to retire and sold his San Antonio Aviation to Randy Bean. A few years later, Bert traveled to England and purchased, from the Rover Company, a Rover T.P. 90 engine. This engine uses a 1S/90 Turbine Drive and was used in the de Havilland Chipmunk, an English Primary Training aircraft. In 1985, Wilcut returned to the Stinson's Hangar #10 (now owned by James L. Transue as T&M Aviation) and started the work to rebuilding and duplicating the T.P.90 Turboprop engine. He then purchased the tooling required from Pratka and built a third Palomino aircraft to use as a test frame for the engine. This is the only known surviving Palomino, N64TT, it is registered as the "Texas Turbo" and is on display at the Texas Air Museum - Stinson Chapter.

== Death ==
Wilcut died peacefully in 2001 at the age of 99 and is buried in Mission Burial Park South, San Antonio, Bexar, Texas, United States.
