= Palomino (aircraft) =

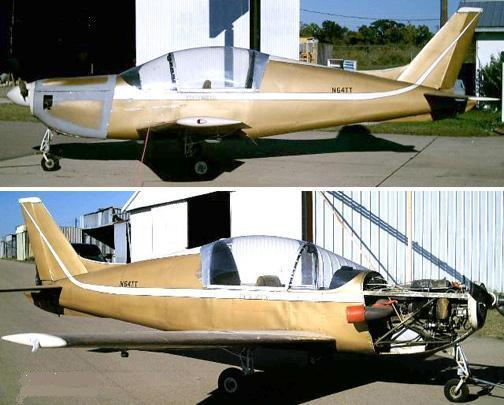
- The only known surviving Palomino, N64TT is registered as the "Texas Turbo". and powered by a Rover turbine.

General information
- Type: Experimental aircraft
- National origin: United States
- Designer: Bert Wilcut

History
- Introduction date: 1967
- First flight: 1963
- Developed from: Midget Mustang

The Palomino is the third generation of the Midget Mustang. The Midget Mustang was a 1948 midget racer developed by Dave Long, Piper's chief engineer. In early 1960s, Bert Wilcut acquired manufacturing right to the Midget Mustang and started to modify the design into the Palomino. Wilcut was involved in the re-engineering and development, along with Dave Lang, Art Mooney, Hal Cronkite, Bill Taylor, and Dick Kraft.

== Operational history ==
In 1962, the first Palomino was a single-seat aircraft made by the Palomino Aircraft Associates, later to become San Antonio Aviation located on Stinson Municipal Airport in San Antonio, Texas. This airplane was powered by a 125 hp Lycoming O-290. Its Federal Aviation Administration number is N40J.

In 1965, the original Palomino was modified to a tandem-seater with a 150 hp Avco Lycoming O-320 engine. Its span is now 28 feet 2 inches and length: 20 feet 7 inches but retained the N40J registration number.

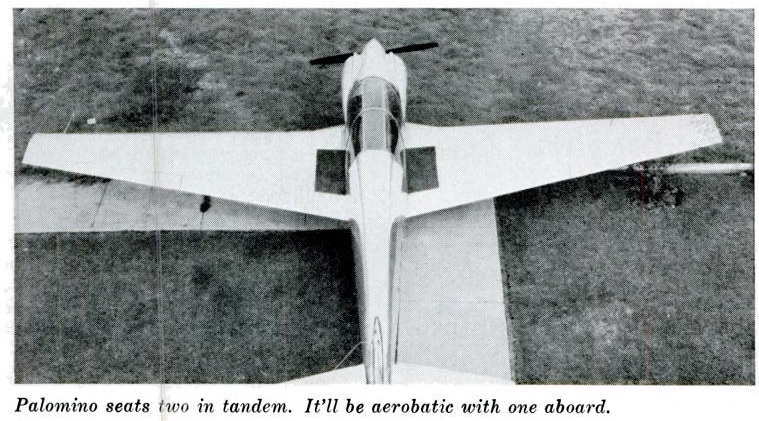
Flying Magazine, Palomino, son of Mustang, January 1967, pg 15-16

== Variants ==
- Palomino reg. no. N40J of the San Antonio Aviation Company (single-seater)
- Palomino same reg. no. N40J of the Palomino Aircraft Associates with upgrade 150 hp Avco Lycoming O-320 engine (tandem two-seater)
- Palomino reg. no. N64TT is the second built tandem two-seater with Rover Turbine engine. FAA registration as the "Texas Turbo".
- Omega same reg. no. N40J of the Integrated Systems Company called "Streak 90" and involved in an accident (hard landing) on 16 October 1964.
- Omega II
- Omega III

== Aircraft on display ==
- Texas Air Museum - Stinson Chapter

== Specifications ==
Data from American airplanes Pa-Pi

General characteristics

- Crew: 1
- Capacity: 2
- Length: 20 ft 7 in (6.27 m)
- Wingspan: 28 ft 2 in (8.59 m)
- Empty weight: 998 lb (453 kg)
- Gross weight: 1,726 lb (783 kg)
- Powerplant: 1 × Franklin 4A-235-B, replaced by Avco Lycoming O-320 150 hp , 130 hp (97 kW)
- Propellers: 2-bladed McCauley

Performance

- Maximum speed: 163 mph (262 km/h, 142 kn)
- Cruise speed: 148 mph (238 km/h, 129 kn)
- Service ceiling: 15,000 ft (4,600 m)

== See also ==
Aircraft of comparable role, configuration, and era

- Midget Mustang
- Omega II
