= Cathy Busby (geologist) =

American geologist

Cathy J. Busby
- Education: University of California, Berkeley (B.Sc., 1976); Princeton University (PhD, 1983)
- Awards: Fellow, Geological Society of America (1995)
- Scientific career
- Workplaces: University of California, Santa Barbara; University of California, Davis
- Doctoral advisor: John Suppe

Cathy J. Busby is an American geologist, and professor emerita at the University of California, Davis. She has been recognised for her contributions to field geology, sedimentology and volcanology.

== Biography and career ==
Busby grew up in Ohio, and later moved to California. She was introduced to geology and plate tectonics by her teachers at the Los Angeles Pierce Community College, before heading to University of California, Berkeley to complete her undergraduate studies in geology. Here, she undertook an undergraduate geological field research project in the Sierra Nevada with Jason Saleeby. Busby graduated with a B.S. degree in 1976. She completed her doctoral research under the guidance of John Suppe at Princeton University and graduated with a PhD in 1983. She was appointed to a faculty position at the University of California, Santa Barbara, in a large departement where there was only one other female faculty member at that time. Busby was a faculty member at UC Santa Barbara for 32 years. She moved in January 2015 to University of California, Davis as professor and research scientist.

== Research ==
Busby's research has had a focus on the sedimentology, volcanology and tectonics of geological rifts and volcanic arcs. Much of her work has used field geology as a primary way of gathering evidence. She has written extensively on aspects of geology of the south-western United States, and parts of contiguous Mexico, including the Walker Lane basins and the Sierra Nevada. She has worked on ancient, exhumed volcanic arcs, such as the Cretaceous age Alisitos arc of Baja California, as well as on the volcanism of the active Izu–Bonin–Mariana volcanic arc. Busby has edited and authored a number of scientific books and monographs during her career to date. Her 1995 book on Tectonics of Sedimentary Basins, co-edited with RV Ingersoll, was described as a "wonderful reference book" by a reviewer in the journal, Nature.

== Selected publications ==
- Busby, CJ; Ingersoll, RV, eds. (1995). Tectonics of Sedimentary Basins. Blackwell Science. ISBN 0-86542-245-1.
- Busby, C; Azor, A, eds. (2011). Tectonics of Sedimentary Basins: Recent Advances. Blackwell Publishing Ltd. doi:10.1002/9781444347166. ISBN 9781444347166.
- Tamura, Y; Busby, CJ; Blum, P; Expedition 350 Scientists, eds. (2015). Izu-Bonin-Mariana Rear Arc, Expedition 350. Proceedings of the International Ocean Discovery Program. Vol. 350.
- Busby, CJ; Morris, RA; DeBari, SM; Medynski, S; Putirka, K; Andrews, GDM; Schmitt, AK; Brown, SR (2023). Geology of a Large Intact Extensional Oceanic Arc Crustal Section with Superior Exposures: Cretaceous Alisitos Arc, Baja California (Mexico). GSA Special Papers. Vol. 560. Geological Society of America. doi:10.1130/SPE560. ISBN 9780813795607.

== Recognition ==
Busby was elected a fellow of the Geological Society of America in 1995.

From 2016 to 2017, Busby was a distinguished lecturer for the International Ocean Discovery Program (IODP), following her work as a co-chief scientist on IODP Leg 350, which was one of three related expeditions to the Izu-Bonin-Mariana volcanic arc in 2014. In 2020, Busby was honoured with the distinguished geologic career award of the mineralogy, geology, petrology and volcanology division of the Geological Society of America, which cited her contributions and accomplishments in "Field Geology, Stratigraphy, Paleogeography, Structural Geology, Sedimentology, and Volcanology".

In 2025, the Geological Society of America published a collection of nineteen papers in a special volume, to celebrate Busby’s contributions to field geology.
