= Coast Range Ophiolite =

Geological formation in California

- Stratigraphic range: Middle-Late Jurassic
- Type: igneous, metamorphic
- Underlies: Great Valley Sequence
- Overlies: Franciscan Complex

Lithology
- Primary: basalt, gabbro, peridotite, schist

Location
- Region: California Coast Ranges
- Country: United States

Type section
- Named for: California Coast Ranges

The Coast Range Ophiolite is an ophiolite of Middle to Late Jurassic age located in the California Coast Ranges. It forms the basement of the extreme western margin of central and northern California. Exposures straddle the coast from Santa Barbara County up to San Francisco. The formation then trends inland up to the southern end of the Klamath Mountains.

The Coast Range ophiolite is arguably the most extensive ophiolite terrane in the United States, and is one of the most studied ophiolites in the world.

== Description ==
The Coast Range ophiolite is a highly dismembered ophiolite sequence located in the California Coast Ranges east and west of the San Andreas Fault. Exposures are scattered over 900km on the western margin of North America, primarily in California. Most ophiolite remnants are less than 10km wide across strike, and are generally less than 5km thick. Across the scattered exposure, ophiolites remnants are lumped into three groups. The first consist of exposures located northwest of Sacramento Valley characterized by ultramafic rocks overlain by mafic breccia and volcanic rocks. Plutonic rocks are rare in this section and sheeted dyke intrusions are absent. The second group of ophiolite remnants located in the northwest and central Coast Ranges contain ultramafic rocks, gabbro, basalt, and are commonly overlain by tuffs or volcanic breccias. Sheeted dykes are only present in a few ophiolite remnants in this region. The third group is characterized by nearly complete ophiolite sequences of ultramafic rocks, cumulate and massive gabbros, steeted intrusive rocks, and basalts. This third group is located in south-central coastal California.

=== Distribution ===
In general, the ophiolite is exposed near the boundary between the sequences of rocks associated with the Coast Ranges, and rocks associated with the Great Valley Sequence. Where it is exposed, it generally underlies the various sedimentary rocks of the Great Valley Sequence, and may be coextensive with the contemporaneous (but slightly younger on average) Franciscan Assemblage, as would be expected by an observational application of the law of superposition. However, in many localities, the ultramafic rocks of the ophiolite can be found intruding or on top of the local country rock.

=== Origin and tectonics ===
Whatever the conditions under which the Coast Range ophiolite formed, it has undergone much deformation and dismemberment since the Jurassic period resulting in the wide distribution of ophiolite fragments across the California coast. One of the main drivers of this ophiolite dismemberment is the active San Andreas fault. Kinematic reconstructions of the ophiolite fragments show that the Jurassic Coast Range Ophiolite retains its original lithospheric coherence, meaning geologists are able to re-construct how the ophiolites have been moved by faults moved since its genesis. Using the supra-subduction back-arc basin model of the Coast Range Ophiolite, geologists were able to reconstruct the deformation history of the western United States since the Jurassic time period between 160 and 170 million years ago. This model showed that the ophiolite belt has been part of the western North American forearc since 150 Ma, and has since been dismembered by the San Andreas Fault zone and other North American tectonic regimes associated with the western subduction zone.

== See also ==
- Franciscan Assemblage
- Point Sal State Beach – notable coastal exposure

== Sources ==
- Bailey, E. H., Blake Jr, M. C. & Jones, D. L. (1970). "On-land Mesozoic oceanic crust in California Coast Ranges" (PDF). Geological Survey Professional Paper. 700C: C70–C81. ISSN 0096-0446. Wikidata Q65798444.
- Dickinson, W. R., Hopson, C. A., Saleeby, J. B.,; et al. (1996). "Alternate Origins of the Coast Range Ophiolite (California):Introduction and Implications" (PDF). GSA Today. 6 (2): 2–10. ISSN 1052-5173. Wikidata Q97990697.
- Shervais, J. (n.d.). John W. Shervais: Research Projects - Ophiolites and Oceanic Crust. Retrieved September 6, 2014.
