= Nexus Mustang =

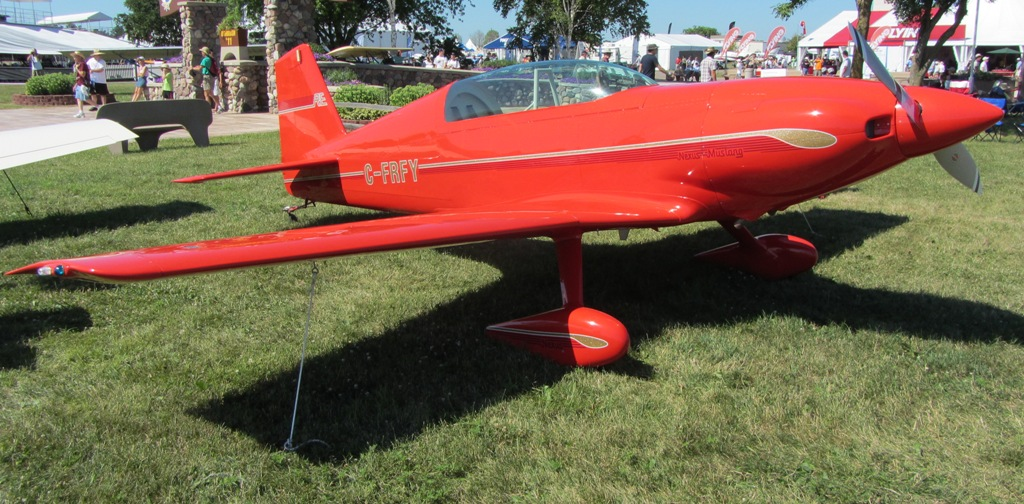

General information
- Type: Homebuilt aircraft
- National origin: Canada
- Designer: Richard Eaves

The Nexus Mustang is a two place homebuilt aircraft designed around the construction techniques of the Midget Mustang.

== Design and development ==
Designer Dick Eaves used his experience building a Baby Ace, Skyhopper II, Wittman Tailwinds, Wag-Aero CUBys, and a Midget Mustang to develop a new two seat tandem homebuilt design.

The aircraft uses an all-aluminum construction with fiberglass nose cowling. The tail surfaces and spar extrusion are modeled after a Mustang II.

== Operational history ==
A Nexus Mustang won first place in the Plans built Category at Sun 'n Fun in 2004 and Bronze Lindy at EAA AirVenture 2004.

== Specifications (Nexus Mustang) ==
Data from Sport Aviation

General characteristics

- Crew: one
- Capacity: one passenger
- Length: 6.02 m (19 ft 9 in)
- Wingspan: 6.76 m (22 ft 2 in)
- Height: 1.70 m (5 ft 7 in)
- Wing area: 8.53 m^{2} (91.8 sq ft)
- Airfoil: GA37A-214
- Empty weight: 492 kg (1,085 lb)
- Gross weight: 771 kg (1,700 lb)
- Powerplant: 1 × Lycoming O-360-C1A , 130 kW (180 hp)
- Propellers: 2-bladed Sensenich 72FNB S16-1-85

Performance

- Maximum speed: 390 km/h (240 mph, 210 kn)
- Cruise speed: 340 km/h (210 mph, 180 kn)
- Stall speed: 101 km/h (63 mph, 55 kn)
- Rate of climb: 8.6 m/s (1,700 ft/min) At gross
