= Franciscan Complex =

Late Mesozoic terrane of heterogeneous rocks in the California Coast Ranges

- Stratigraphic range: Late Jurassic to Late Cretaceous
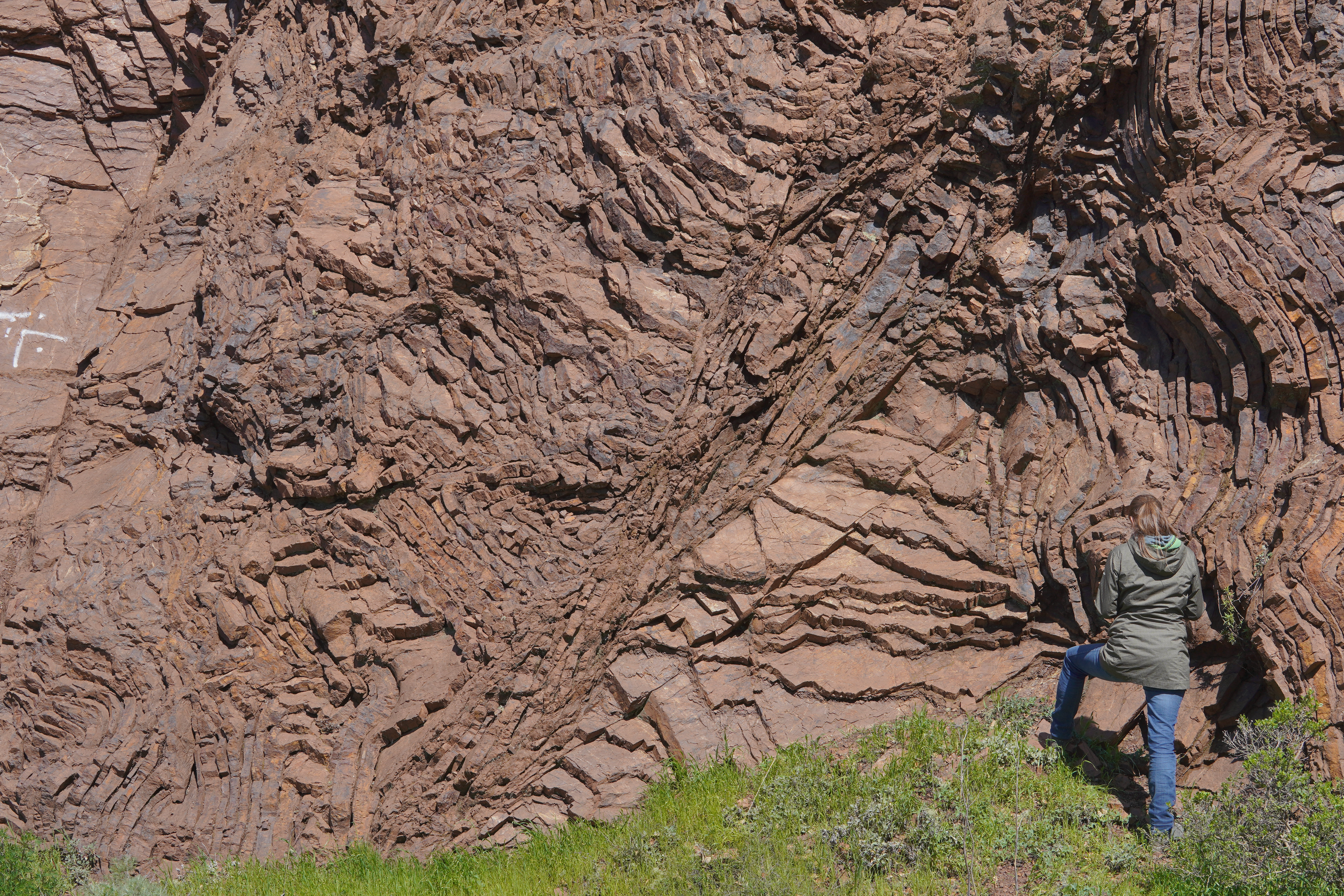
- Chevron folds in ribbon chert of the Marin Headlands, California. Geologist Christie Rowe for scale.
- Type: varied; primarily metamorphic (low grade), but also sedimentary, igneous and high-pressure metamorphic
- Underlies: Coast Range Ophiolite, Great Valley Sequence
- Overlies: various

Lithology
- Primary: schist (incl. serpentinite), sandstone, basalt, greywackes
- Other: shale, chert

Location
- Region: California Coast Ranges, northern Transverse Ranges
- Country: United States

Type section
- Named for: San Francisco, California

The Franciscan Complex or Franciscan Assemblage is a geologic term for a late Mesozoic terrane of heterogeneous rocks found throughout the California Coast Ranges, and particularly on the San Francisco Peninsula. It was named by geologist Andrew Lawson, who also named the San Andreas Fault that defines the western extent of the assemblage.

The Franciscan Complex is dominated by greywacke sandstones, shales and conglomerates which have experienced low-grade metamorphism. Other important lithologies include chert, basalt, limestone, serpentinite, and high-pressure, low-temperature metabasites (blueschists and eclogites) and meta-limestones. Fossils like radiolaria are found in chert beds of the Franciscan Complex. These fossils have been used to provide age constraints on the different terranes that constitute the Franciscan. The mining opportunities within the Franciscan are restricted to deposits of cinnabar and limestone.

The outcrops of the formation have a very large range, extending from Douglas County, Oregon, to Santa Barbara County, California. Franciscan-like formations may be as far south as Santa Catalina Island. The formation lends its name to the term describing high-pressure regional metamorphic facies, the Franciscan facies series.

== Geologic history ==
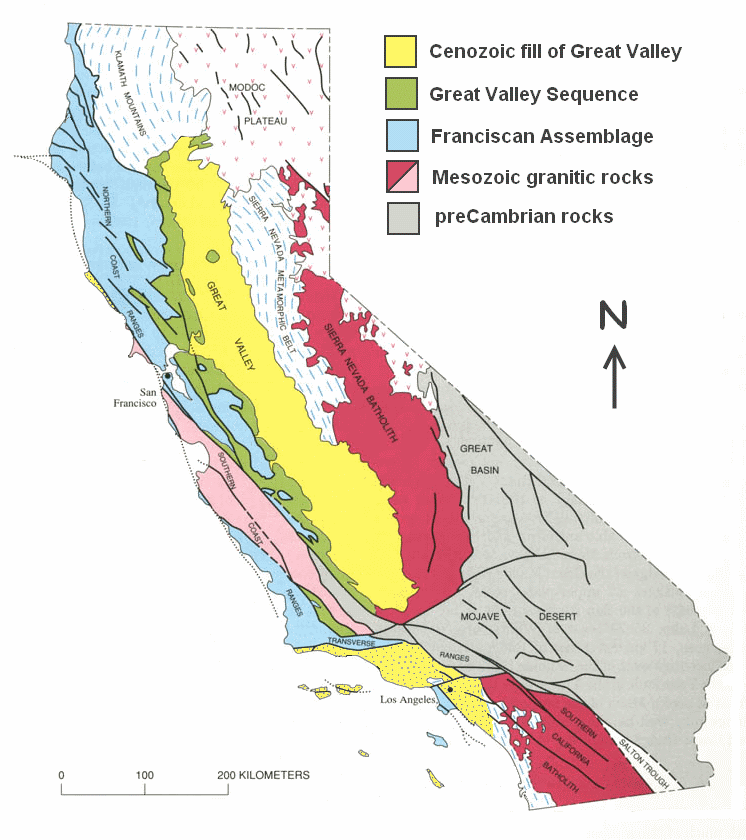
Map modified from Irwin (1990) showing distribution of Great Valley Sequence and Franciscan Complex (in blue).

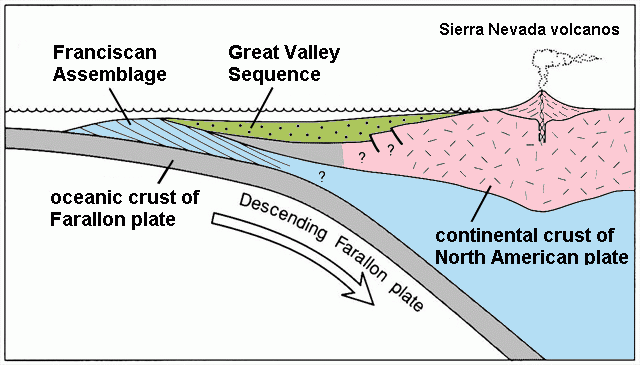
Diagram (modified from Fig 3.11 in Irwin, 1990) showing the depositional setting of the Franciscan Assemblage and the contemporaneous Great Valley Sequence.

The Franciscan Complex is an assemblage of metamorphosed and deformed rocks, associated with east-dipping subduction zone at the western coast of North America. Although most of the Franciscan is Early/Late Jurassic through Cretaceous in age (150-66 Ma), some Franciscan rocks are as old as early Jurassic (180-190 Ma) age and as young as Miocene (15 Ma). The different age distribution represents the temporal and spatial variation of mechanisms that operated within the subduction zone. Franciscan rocks are thought to have formed prior to the creation of the San Andreas Fault when an ancient deep-sea trench existed along the California continental margin. This trench, the remnants of which are still active in the Cascadia and Cocos subduction zone, resulted from subduction of oceanic crust of the Farallon tectonic plate beneath continental crust of the North American Plate. As oceanic crust descended beneath the continent, ocean floor basalt and sediments were subducted and then tectonically underplated to the upper plate. This resulted in widespread deformation with the generation of thrust faults and folding, and caused high pressure-low temperature regional metamorphism. In the Miocene, the Farallon-Pacific spreading center reached the Franciscan trench and the relative motion between Pacific-North America caused the initiation of the San Andreas Fault. Transform motion along the San Andreas Fault obscured and displaced the subduction related structures, resulting in overprinting of two generations of structures.

== Description ==
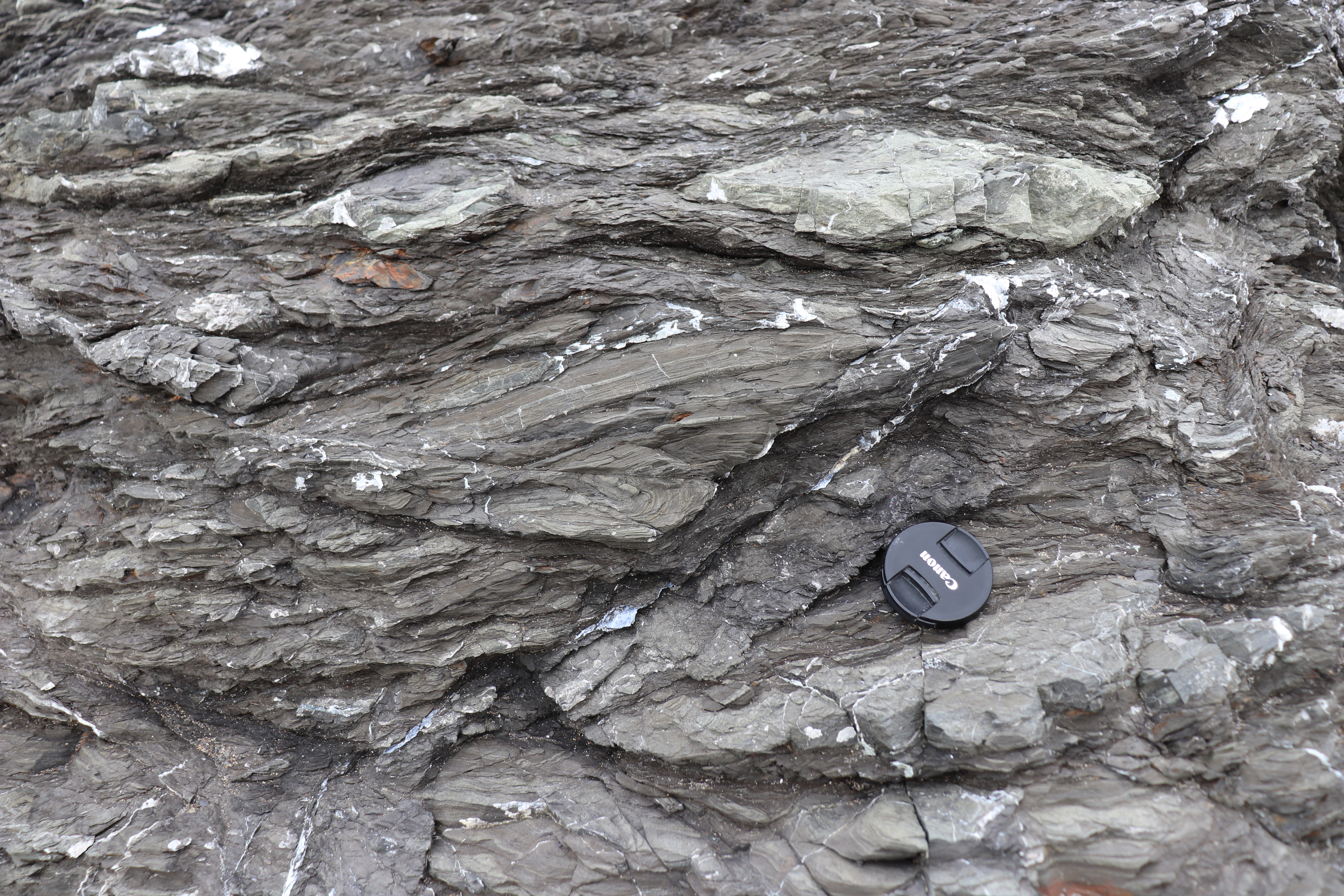
Shale matrix mélange with clasts of sandstone and greenstone on Marshall's Beach, San Francisco

The units of the Franciscan complex are aligned parallel to the active margin between the North American and Pacific plates. The Franciscan Complex is in contact with the Great Valley Sequence, which was deposited on the Coast Range Ophiolite, along its eastern side. The type area of Franciscan rocks in San Francisco consists of metagraywackes, gray claystone and shale, thin bedded ribbon chert with abundant radiolarians, altered submarine pillow basalts (greenstone) and blueschists. Broadly, the Franciscan can be divided into two groups of rocks. Coherent terranes are internally consistent in metamorphic grade and include folded and faulted clastic sediments, cherts and basalts, ranging from sub-metamorphic to prehnite-pumpellyite or low-temperature blueschist (jadeite-bearing) grades of metamorphism. Mélange terranes are much smaller, found between or within the larger coherent terranes and sometimes contain large blocks of metabasic rocks of higher metamorphic grade (amphibolite, eclogite, and garnet-blueschist). The mélange zones in the Franciscan usually have a block in matrix appearance with higher grade metamorphic blocks (blueschist, amphibolite, greenschist, eclogite) embedded within the mélange matrix. The matrix material of the mélanges are mudstone or serpentinite. Geologists have argued for either a tectonic or olistostromal origin. In the northern Coast Ranges, the Franciscan has been divided into the Eastern, Central and Coastal Belts based on metamorphic age and grade, with the rocks younging and the metamorphic grade decreasing to the west. The Franciscan varies along strike, because individual accreted elements (packets of trench sediment, seamounts, etc.) did not extend the full length of the trench. Different depths of underplating, distribution of post-metamorphic faulting, and level of erosion produced the present-day surface distribution of high P/T metamorphism.

=== Gallery ===
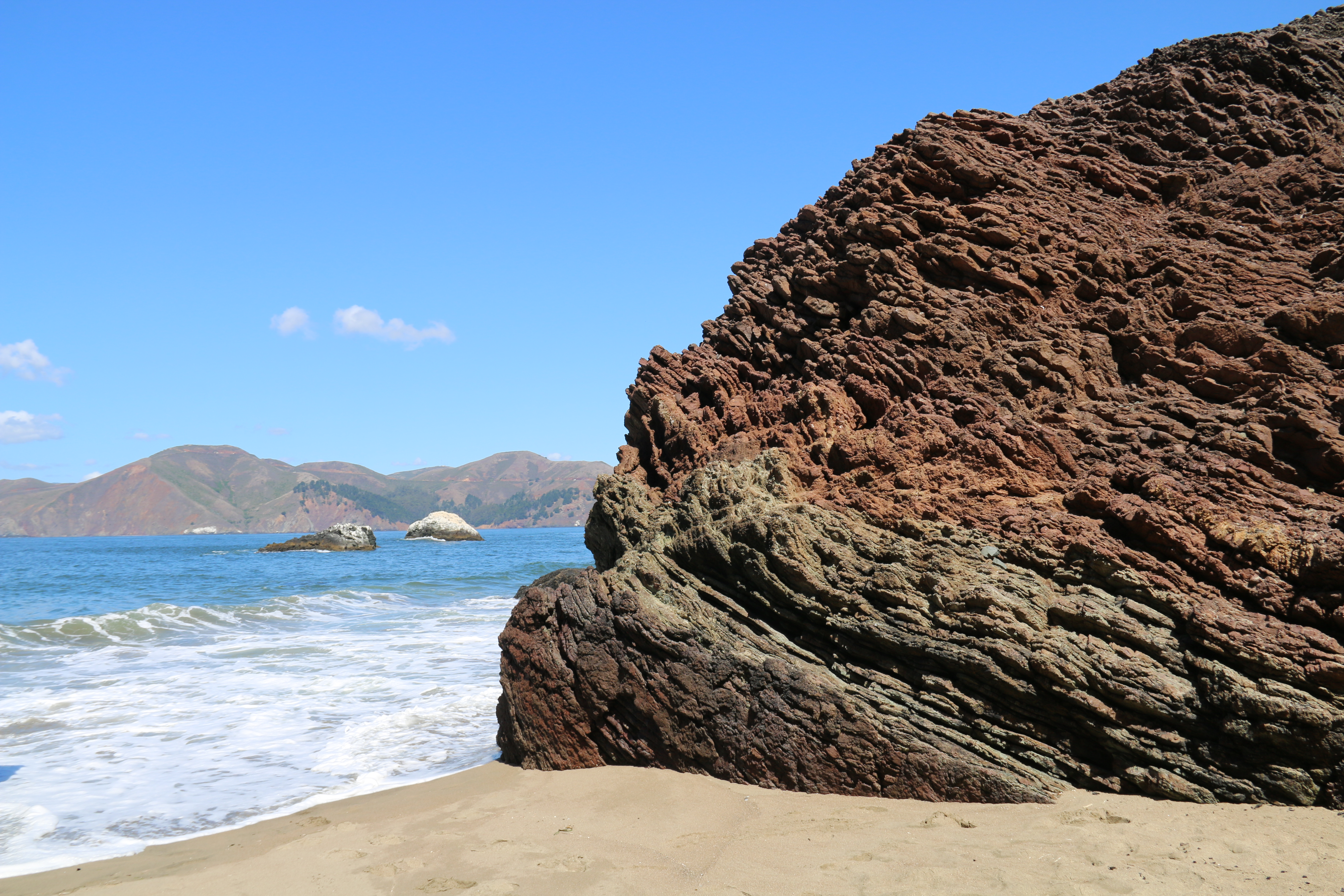
Ribbon Chert of the Marin Headlands Terrane, exposed at Marshall's Beach, San Francisco.

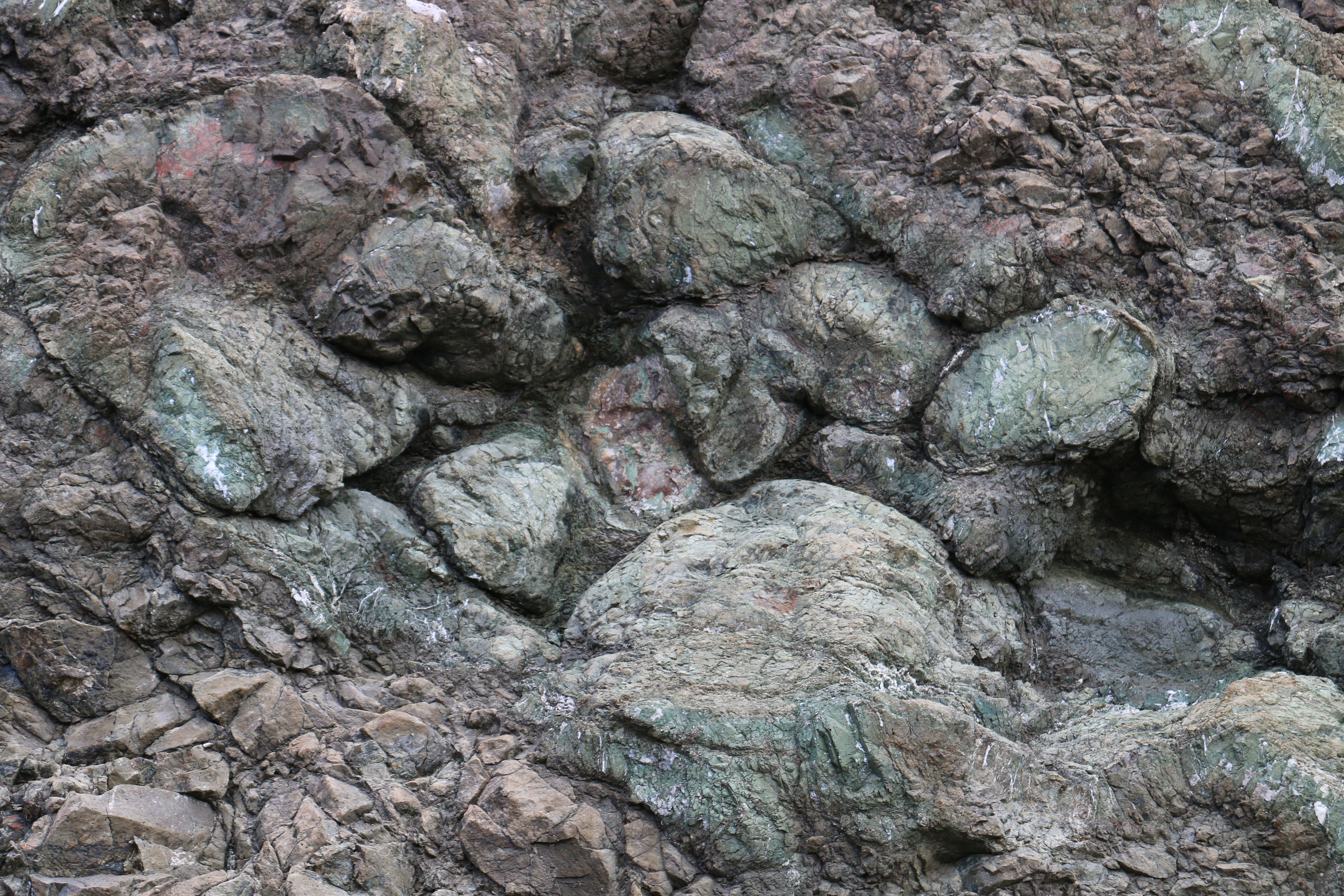
Pillow structures preserved in greenschist-facies metamorphosed basalts of the Franciscan Complex, Black Sands Beach, Marin Headlands, California. Field of view is approximately 2 m wide.

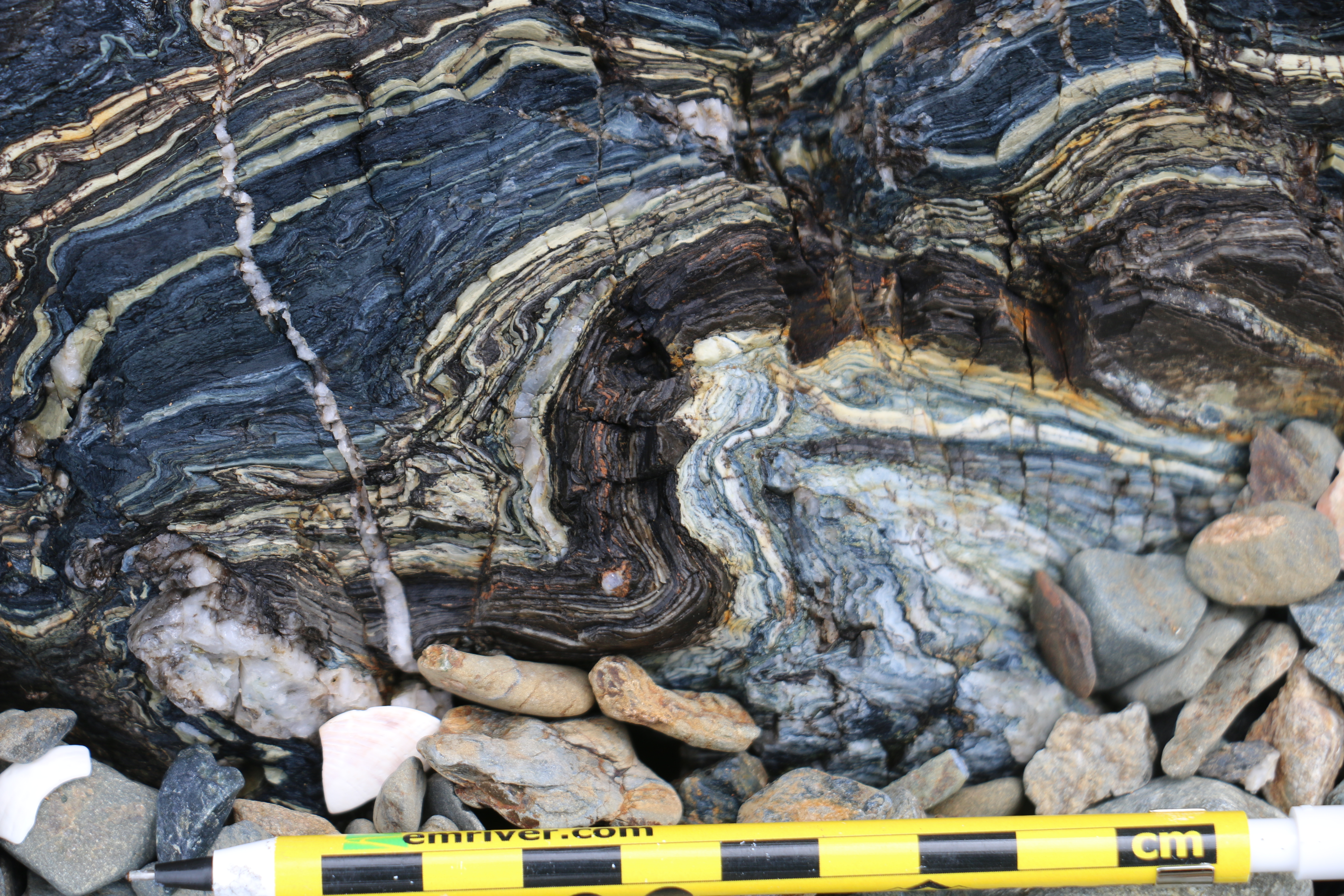
Folded blue metacherts with glaucophane-rich layers, exposed in outcrops on Kayak Beach, Angel Island, northern San Francisco Bay.

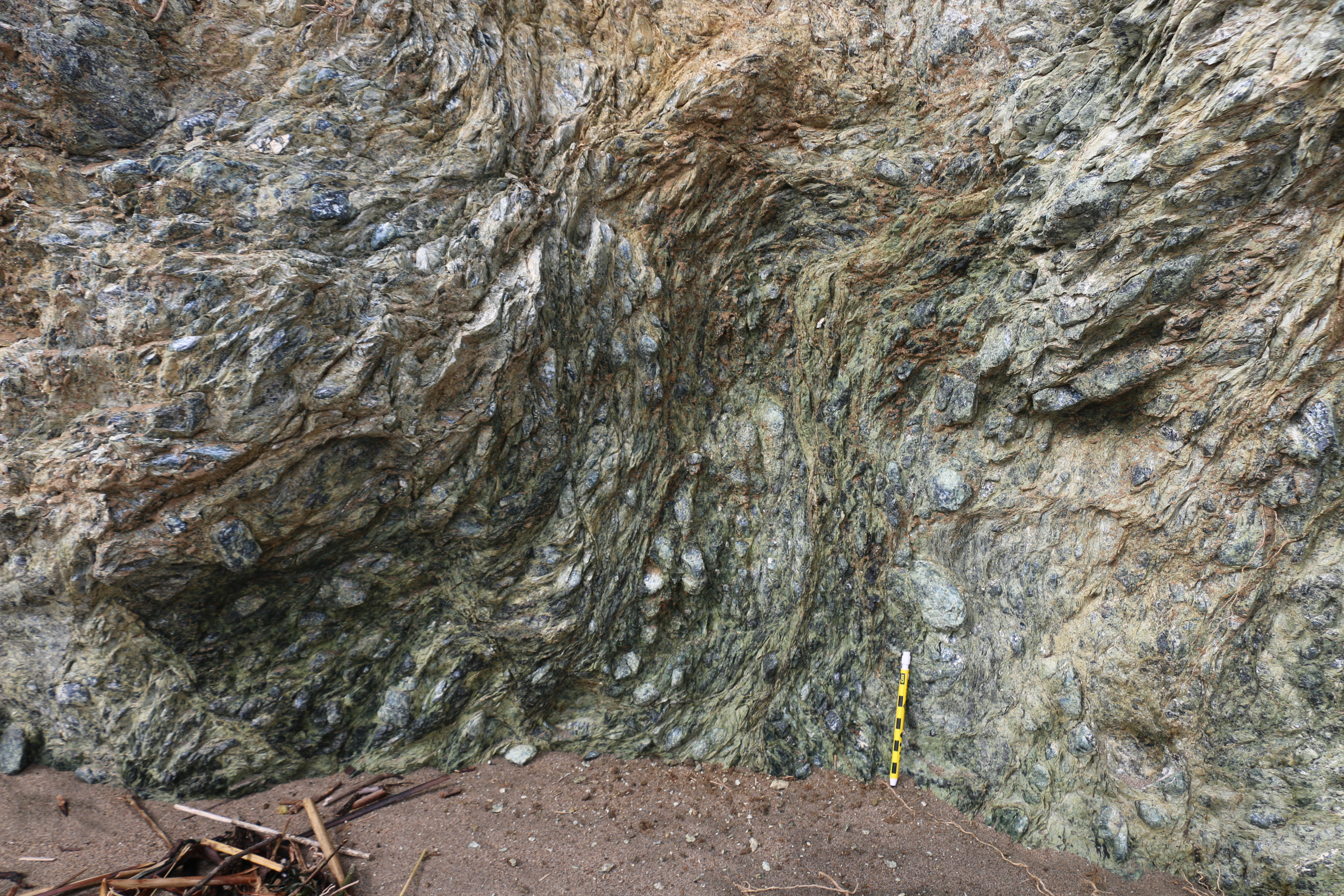
Sheared block-in-matrix fabric composed of serpentinite blocks in serpentinite matrix, exposed on Perles Beach, Angel Island, Marin County, California. Pencil for scale. The strong anastomosing foliation is folded, sub-vertical in the lower part of the photo and more gently dipping in the upper part of the photo.

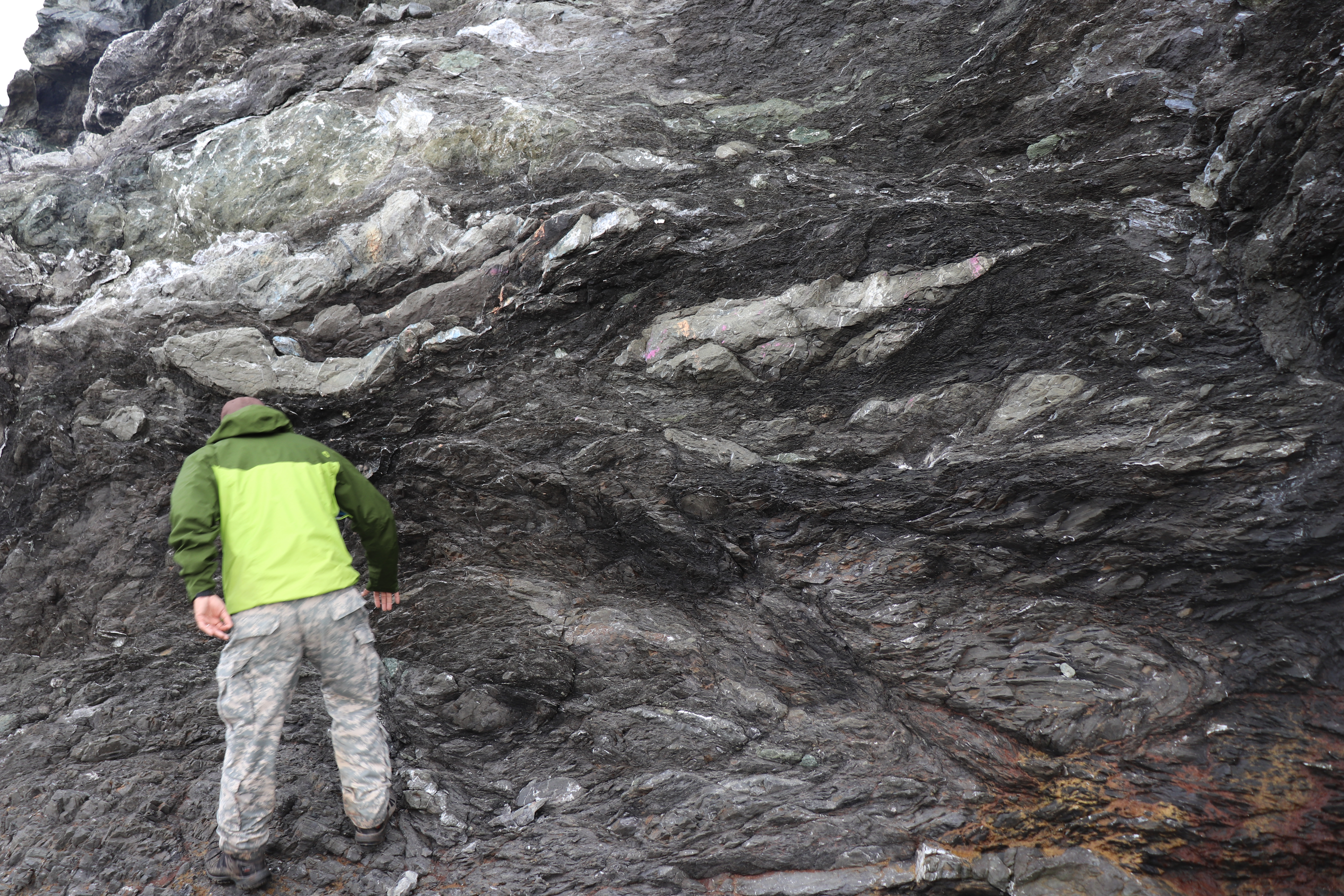
Shale matrix mélange of the Franciscan Complex at Marshall's Beach, San Francisco, California. Sandstone blocks (light grey) contain white mineral veins. Dark grey shale matrix displays strongly foliated anastomosing scaly fabric. Geologist John Wakabayashi for scale.

== Fossils ==
Franciscan sediments contain a sparse, but diverse assemblage of fossils. The most abundant fossils by far are microfossils, particularly in the cherts, which contain single-celled organisms called radiolarians that have exoskeletons of silica. There are also in some of the shales microfossils of planktonic foraminifera that have exoskeletons of carbonate. These microfossils, by and large, indicate deposition in an open-water setting where deep-water conditions exist. Vertebrate fossils in the Franciscan are extremely rare, but include three Mesozoic marine reptiles that are shown in the table below. Again, these indicate an open-water, and therefore deep-marine setting. Although rare, a few shallow-marine fossils have been found as well, and include extinct oysters (Inoceramus) and clams (Buchia). Microfossils in the Calera Limestone member of the Franciscan exposed at the Permanente and Pacifica cement quarries also indicate a shallow-marine setting, with deposition on top of a seamount in the tropical Pacific Ocean and subsequent transport and accretion by the Pacific Plate onto the California continental margin. Thus, even though most of the Franciscan appears to have been deposited in a deep-water setting, it is a complex and diverse assemblage of rocks, and shallow-water settings, though not the norm, existed as well.

Mesozoic Vertebrate Fossils of the Franciscan Complex
Genus	Species	Notes
Ichthyosaurus	californicus	Name means "fish-lizard of California." Found in 1935 in Stanislaus County in a piece of Franciscan chert from the Coast Ranges washed into the Great Valley.
Ichthyosaurus	franciscanus	Name means "fish-lizard of the Franciscan." Found in 1940 in San Joaquin County in a piece of Franciscan chert from the Coast Ranges washed into the Great Valley.
Plesiosaurus	hesternus	Name means "one who is near to being a lizard of the West coast." Found in 1949 in San Luis Obispo County in a limestone concretion in Franciscan-Knoxville shales.

== Economic importance ==
Although no significant accumulations of oil or gas have been found in the Franciscan, other opportunities have been exploited over the years. During the 19th century when gold mining was one of the main industries in California, cinnabar associated with serpentine in the Franciscan and Great Valley Group was mined for quicksilver (mercury) needed to process gold ore and gold-bearing gravels. Some of the more important mines were those at New Idria and New Almaden, the Sulphur Bank Mine at Clearlake Oaks, and the Knoxville Mine (cf. McLaughlin Mine) and others at Knoxville. The Franciscan also contains large bodies of limestone pure enough for making cement, and the Permanente Quarry near Cupertino, California is a giant open-pit mine in a body of Franciscan limestone that supplied most of the cement for building the Shasta Dam across the Sacramento River. The Rockaway Quarry in Pacifica is another example of a major limestone quarry in the Franciscan.

== See also ==
- California landslides
- Farallon Plate – Ancient oceanic plate that has mostly subducted under the North American plate
- Great Valley Sequence – Group of late Mesozoic formations in the Central Valley of California
- Subduction – Geological process at tectonic plate boundaries
- Accretionary prism
