= Great Valley Sequence =

Group of late Mesozoic formations in the Central Valley of California

- Stratigraphic range: Late Jurassic through Cretaceous
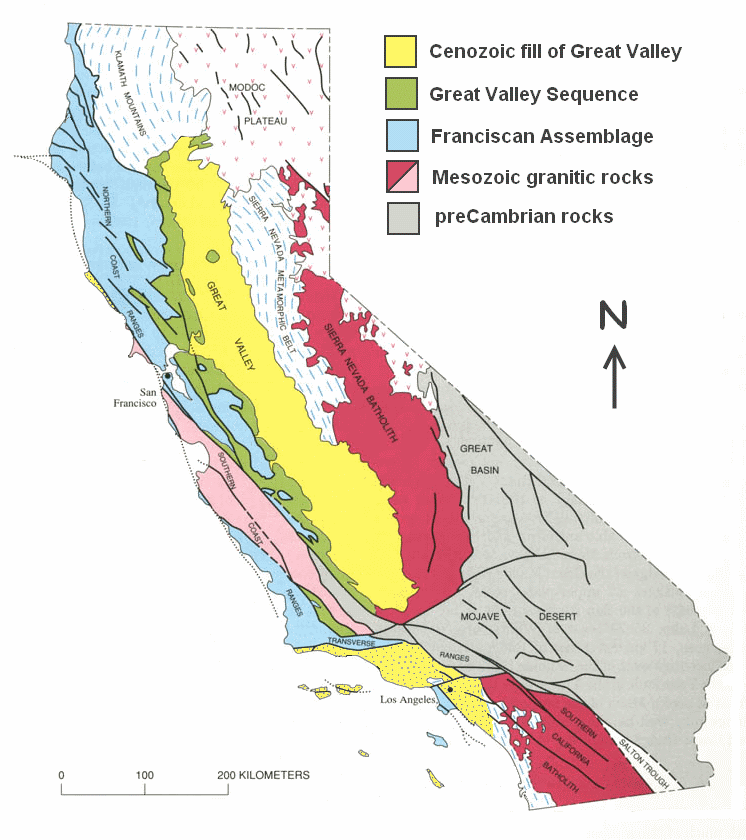
- Geologic map showing location of the Great Valley Sequence. Modified from Irwin (1990)
- Type: Sedimentary
- Underlies: Cenozoic sedimentary fill
- Overlies: Coast Range ophiolite, Franciscan Complex
- Thickness: up to 40,000 feet (12 km)

Lithology
- Primary: shale and sandstone
- Other: minor conglomerate

Location
- Region: Great Valley-Central Valley of California
- Country: United States

Type section
- Named for: Great Valley-(Central Valley) of California
- Named by: Baily, Irwin & Jones (1964)

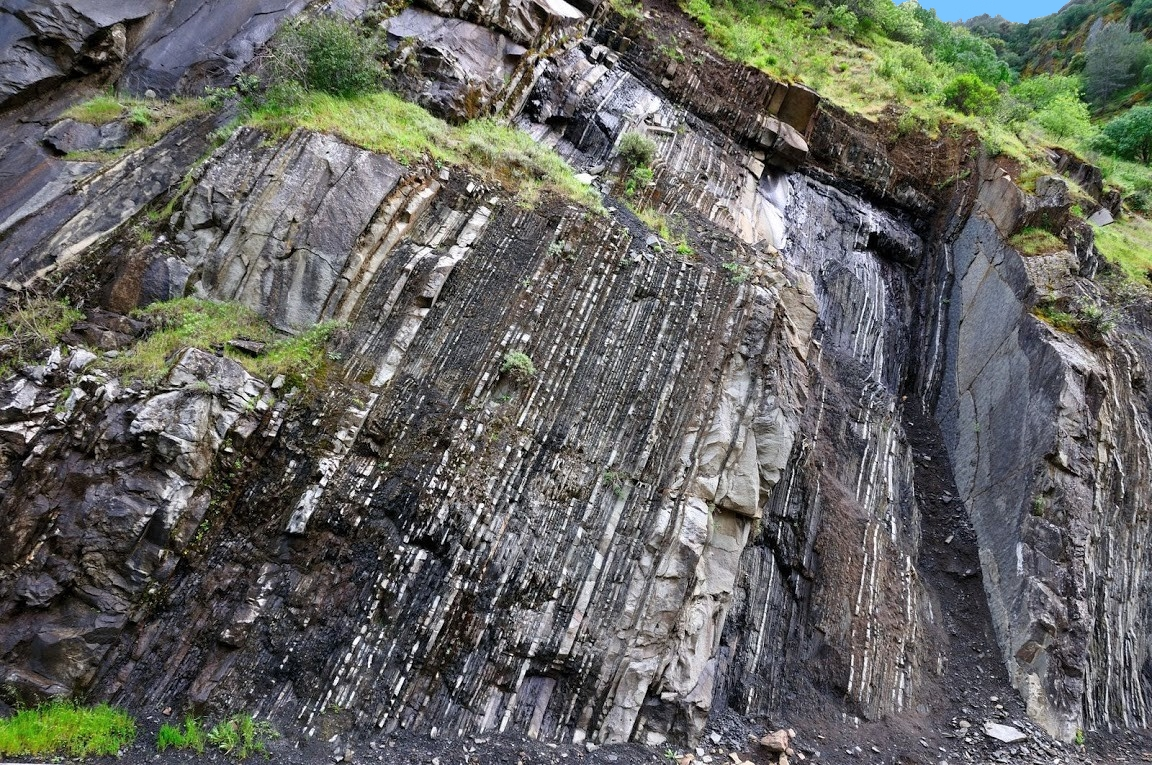
Turbidites in the Venado Sandstone (Great Valley Sequence) at Lake Berryessa, California.

The Great Valley Sequence of California is a 40,000-foot (12 km)-thick group of related geologic formations that are Late Jurassic through Cretaceous in age (150–65 Ma) on the geologic time scale. These sedimentary rocks were deposited during the late Mesozoic Era in an ancient seaway that corresponds roughly to the outline of the modern Great Valley (Central Valley) of California.

== Description ==
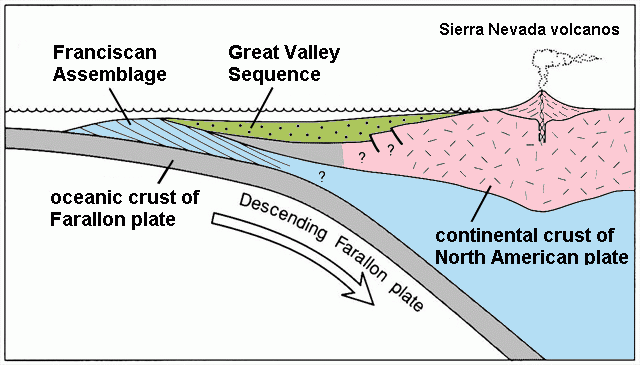
Diagram showing depositional setting of the Great Valley Sequence and coeval Franciscan Assemblage

Although the total thickness of the Great Valley Sequence in places is upwards of 7 miles (11 km), most of these rocks today are buried beneath the thick Cenozoic sedimentary fill of the Great Valley of California. A number of gas and oil wells do penetrate these rocks in the subsurface of the valley, and these same rocks also crop out extensively along the west margin of the valley and to a lesser extent along the northern and eastern margins. The sequence overlies the Franciscan Assemblage along the west margin of its extent, and onlaps onto granitic rocks of the Sierra Nevada in the east.

The rocks in Great Valley Sequence are largely shale deposited in a deep-marine setting with thick bodies of sandstone and minor conglomerate that represent ancient deep-sea submarine fans and submarine canyons. Individual sandstone beds within these fans and canyons are typically turbidites and related sediment gravity flow deposits, such as the chaotic, often coarse-grained deposits of submarine mudflows. By contrast, the shales represent clay that was originally suspended in the water column and slowly settled out on the deep ocean floor. Thus, the mudstones represent background sedimentation that took place continuously, whereas the turbidites and mudflow deposits, by and large, represent sudden events.

== Tectonic depositional setting ==
The ancient marine basin that the Great Valley Sequence was deposited in very closely approximates the combined extent of the modern Sacramento Valley and San Joaquin Valley as delineated by the California Coast Ranges on the west side and the Sierra Nevada on the east. Geologists believe that the Great Valley Sequence represents the sedimentary fill of forearc basin formed along the convergent plate boundary that existed along the west coast of North America during the Jurassic and Cretaceous. During this time oceanic crust was being subducted beneath the continental margin prior to formation of the modern San Andreas Fault.

The eastern boundary of the forearc basin was a volcanic arc, a chain of ancient volcanoes located where the Sierra Nevada is today. Batholiths and metamorphosed volcanic rocks in the Sierra Nevada are the geologic record of this volcanic arc. As these ancient Sierran volcanoes were rapidly eroded they fed volcanic-derived sediment through submarine canyons westward to the ancient submarine fans of the Great Valley Sequence. Additional sediment was fed into the basin as the granitic roots of these volcanoes were uplifted and eroded. As a consequence, the volcanic cover of the Sierra Nevada has been largely stripped off and used by nature to fill the Great Valley basin. Little sediment is believed to have been derived from the uplifted Franciscan rocks of the Coast Ranges.

The western boundary of this basin was created by the growth and uplift of an accretionary wedge consisting of sedimentary, volcanic and metamorphic rocks scraped off the subducting plate. The uplift of this accretionary wedge acted like a dam to form the western side of a basin in which the Great Valley Sequence was deposited. The geologic record of this accretionary wedge are the metamorphic and sedimentary rocks of the Franciscan Assemblage that today make up much of the California Coast Ranges.

The Great Valley Sequence was largely deposited atop basaltic rocks representing a slab of oceanic crust of mid-Jurassic age which was incorporated into the North American continent and today is known as the Coast Range Ophiolite.

== Fossils ==
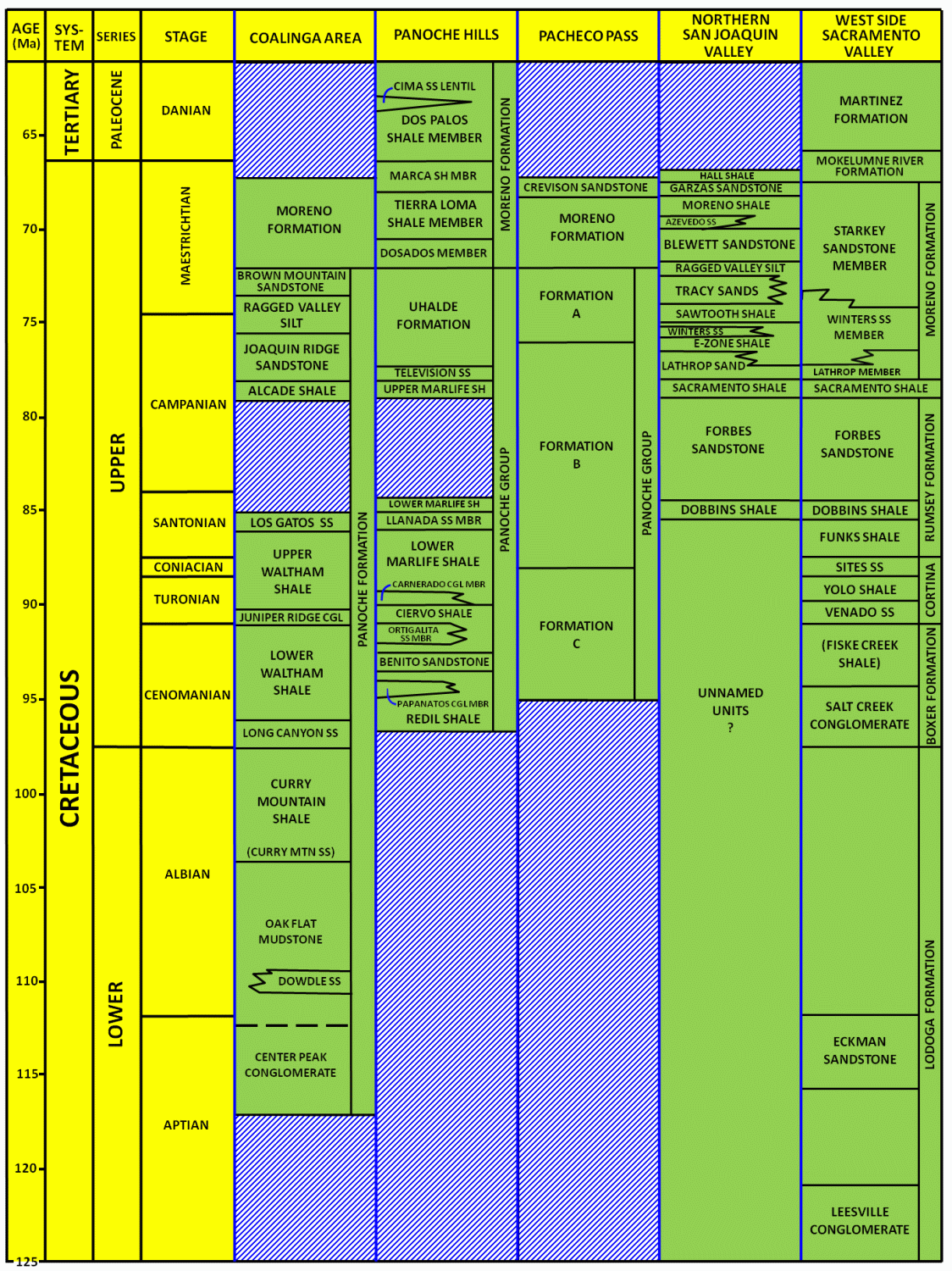
Chart showing some of the geologic formations included in the Great Valley Sequence.

The Great Valley Sequence contains a diverse and abundant assemblage of fossils that includes microfossils, plant remains, invertebrate marine creatures, and vertebrates. The microfossils are particularly important, as unique assemblages of microfossils, especially benthic (bottom-dwelling) and planktonic (free-floating) foraminifera, that are abundant in some of the shales are used to assign ages to the rocks. The particular assemblage of benthic foraminifera present in various rock formations can also be used to estimate the water depth in which these sediments were deposited. Palynomorphs, which are organic-walled microfossils that include the spores and pollen of ancient plants, can be particularly useful for determining what the ancient climate was like. Another variety of palynomorphs called dinoflagellates can be as valuable for age determinations as foraminifera. Invertebrate fossils found in the Great Valley Sequence include various bivalves, gastropods, and even coiled ammonites. Vertebrate fossils have been found also, mainly in the Chico and Moreno Formations in the uppermost part of the sequence, and include fish, flying reptiles (pterosaurs), and a variety of marine reptiles, including turtles, mosasaurs, plesiosaurs and ichthyosaurs. There is even the recorded find at the canyon of Del Puerto Creek near Patterson in 1936 of the first dinosaur bones ever found in California, the vertebrae and hindquarters of a hadrosaur, a land-dwelling dinosaur that apparently died near the coast and was subsequently washed out to sea by a river.

== Formations ==
The Great Valley Sequence contains several geologic formations. Because geologists studying this sequence in different areas have used different formation names over the years to describe the same packages of rocks, the nomenclature is complex and confusing. Parts of the sequence are well exposed at several places along a line of outcrops that extends for about 150 miles (241 km) along the west side of the Sacramento Valley and San Joaquin Valley (both of which make up the Great Valley of California). These same rocks are also found in several deep wells in oil and gas fields located in the center of the valley. Geologists working these different areas independent of each other developed different sets of formation names for the different areas. Yet refinements in dating the ages of the different units has led to the realization that an interval of rock in one area may be exactly the same age as the rocks in another area, yet be referred to by a completely different formation name.

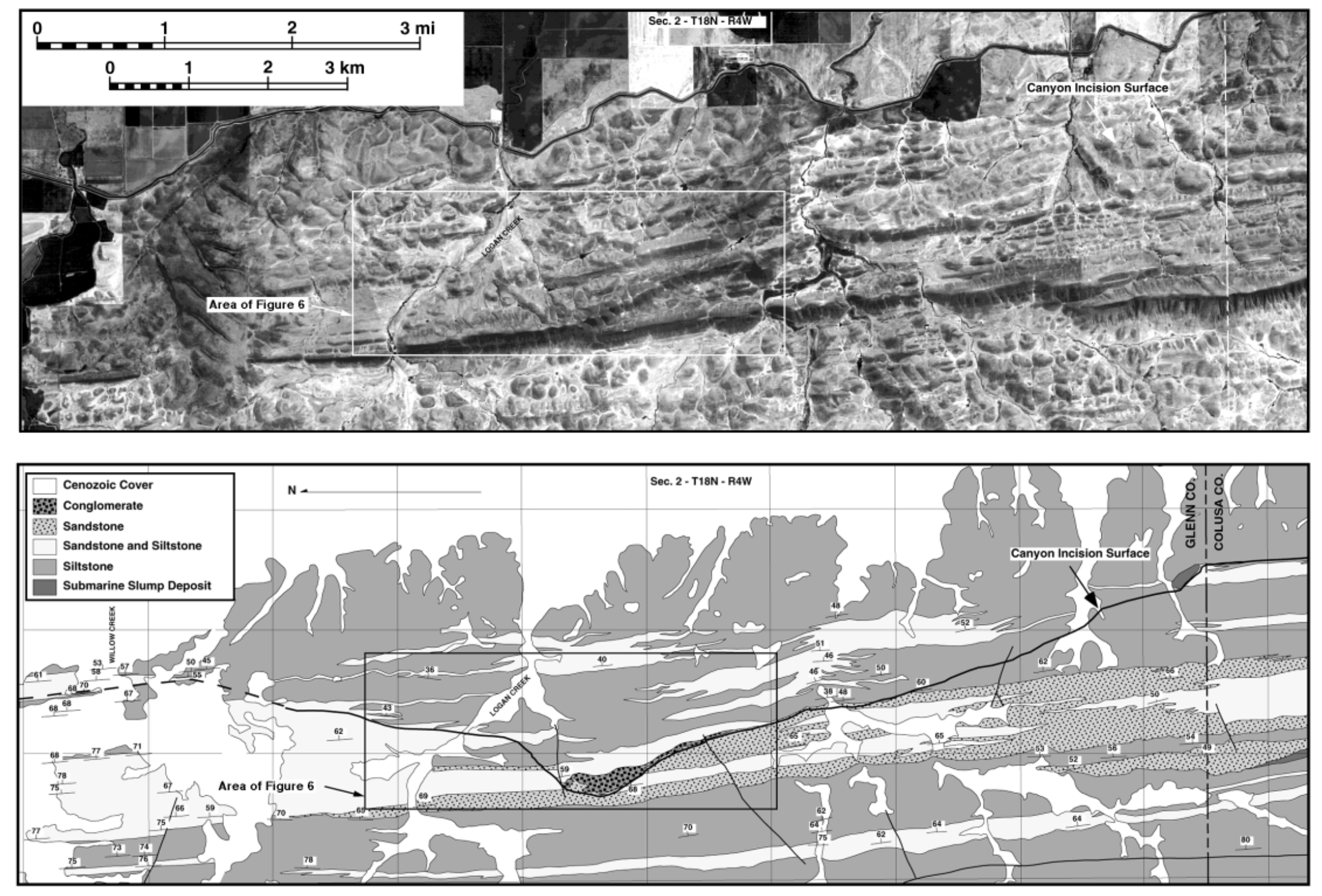
Upper Cretaceous Great Valley Sequence rocks including a fossil submarine canyon, exposed on the west side of the Sacramento Valley near Willows

Some of the best outcrops for these rocks are on the west side of the southern Sacramento Valley at Putah Creek and Cache Creek canyons. The formation names used here extend to the subsurface where several gas wells in the center of the valley produce from the same rocks, and from younger rocks that overlie them. Although the younger rocks are not exposed in the canyons to the west, most geologists combine the formation names from the west side outcrops with the subsurface names from the gas fields to create a coherent set of names that is largely agreed upon for most of the Sacramento Valley.

The same is not true for the San Joaquin Valley to the south, where another area of well-known outcrops is found in the hills to the west of Coalinga. This area uses a completely different set of formation names for exactly the same group of rocks as are found to the north. Yet another set of formation names is applied to Great Valley rocks penetrated by oil and gas wells in the subsurface northeast of Coalinga in the area near Stockton in the northern part of San Joaquin Valley. In addition, there are several lesser known areas in the San Joaquin Valley that each have their own terminologies. All of these names are firmly established in the geologic literature and attempts to set up a unified set of formation names have not met with success. An exception are the Jurassic-age rocks of the Great Valley Sequence, which most geologists assign to the Knoxville Formation, irrespective of location.

== Economic importance ==
The Sacramento Basin in the northern portion of the Great Valley is a prolific natural gas province, and most of the gas here is produced from sandstone reservoirs in the Upper Cretaceous part of the Great Valley Sequence. Virtually all of this gas is derived from organic-rich shales interbedded with the sandstone reservoirs. As such, a self-contained source-reservoir petroleum system exists. Numerous gas accumulations have been found within this system. Particularly noteworthy is the Rio Vista Gas Field, which has produced more gas than any other field in California. Many active fields continue to produce large volumes of gas from the Great Valley Sequence, and exploration for new accumulations continues. The only oil produced from reservoirs in the Great Valley Sequence is from the Oil City pool at Coalinga Oil Field, and from two small pools at the Brentwood Oil Field to the south of Rio Vista.

== See also ==
- Franciscan Assemblage – Late Mesozoic terrane of heterogeneous rocks in the California Coast Ranges
- Natural history of the Central Valley (California)
