= Michael Bushby =

English cricketer (1931–2020)

Personal information
- Full name: Michael Howard Bushby
- Born: 29 July 1931; Macclesfield, Cheshire
- Died: 8 February 2020 (aged 88); Maidstone, Kent, England
- Batting: Right-handed

Domestic team information
- Years: Team
- 1952–1954: Cambridge University

Career statistics
Competition	First-class
Matches	46
Runs scored	1,919
Batting average	24.92
100s/50s	3/6
Top score	113
Balls bowled	16
Wickets	1
Bowling average	11.00
5 wickets in innings	0
10 wickets in match	0
Best bowling	1/7
Catches/stumpings	12/–
- Source: Cricinfo, 14 February 2020

Michael Howard Bushby (29 July 1931 – 8 February 2020) was an English cricketer. He played 43 first-class matches for Cambridge University Cricket Club between 1952 and 1954.

An opening batsman, Mike Bushby captained Cambridge University in 1954. His highest score was 113 against Lancashire in 1954.

Bushby spent his working life as a teacher at Tonbridge School, where he taught history. He ran the school's cricket from 1956 to 1972. He retired in 1991, and moved to a house 200 yards from the school.
