= Edward Bushby =

English cricketer

Personal information
- Full name: Edward Bushby
- Born: 3 April 1817; Sompting, Sussex, England
- Died: 29 February 1856 (aged 38); Henfield, Sussex, England
- Batting: Right-handed

Domestic team information
- Years: Team
- 1843–1854: Sussex

Career statistics
Competition	First-class
Matches	64
Runs scored	1,485
Batting average	14.55
100s/50s	–/3
Top score	86
Balls bowled	48
Wickets	–
Bowling average	–
5 wickets in innings	–
10 wickets in match	–
Best bowling	–
Catches/stumpings	27/–
- Source: Cricinfo, 20 January 2013

Edward Bushby (3 April 1817 – 29 February 1856) was an English cricketer. Bushby was a right-handed batsman and noted long stop fielder. He was born at Sompting, Sussex.

Bushby made his first-class debut for Sussex against the Marylebone Cricket Club at Lord's in 1843, with him making five further first-class appearances for the county in that year. He made several further first-class appearances the following year and was deemed good enough to play for the Players in the Gentlemen v Players fixture at Lord's. He also played two first-class fixtures for Petworth Cricket Club against the Marylebone Cricket Club in 1844, as well as playing a first-class match each for a team of Single men against a team of Married men and for England against Kent. He made several further appearances in 1845 for Sussex, Petworth, England and the Players, making ten appearances in first-class cricket. The start of the following season saw Bushby selected to play for Fuller Pilch's personal eleven against the personal eleven of Nicholas Felix, for the remainder of the season he made five further appearances in first-class matches for Sussex, while the following year he made just three appearances for the county. He made no appearances in first-class cricket in 1848, but did return to play in seven matches for Sussex in 1849, before making a further five appearances in 1850. Of his three first-class appearances in 1851, one included appearing for the South in the North v South fixture. In 1852, he appeared in five first-class matches for Sussex and the following year he made four further appearances for it. He also played in 1853 for a combined Kent and Sussex team against an All England Eleven. 1854 was to be his final season in first-class cricket, with Bushby making five appearances for Sussex and a single appearance for the South against the North. In total he made 64 recorded appearances in first-class matches, the majority of which were for Sussex. His 50 appearances for the county saw him score 1,103 runs at an average of 13.78, with three half centuries and a high score of 86.

Outside of cricket he was employed as a gardener by his Sussex teammate Alfred Smith. He died at Henfield, Sussex on 29 February 1856.
