= Mustang Aeronautics Mustang II =

Two-seat homebuilt sportsplane

Bushby Mustang II
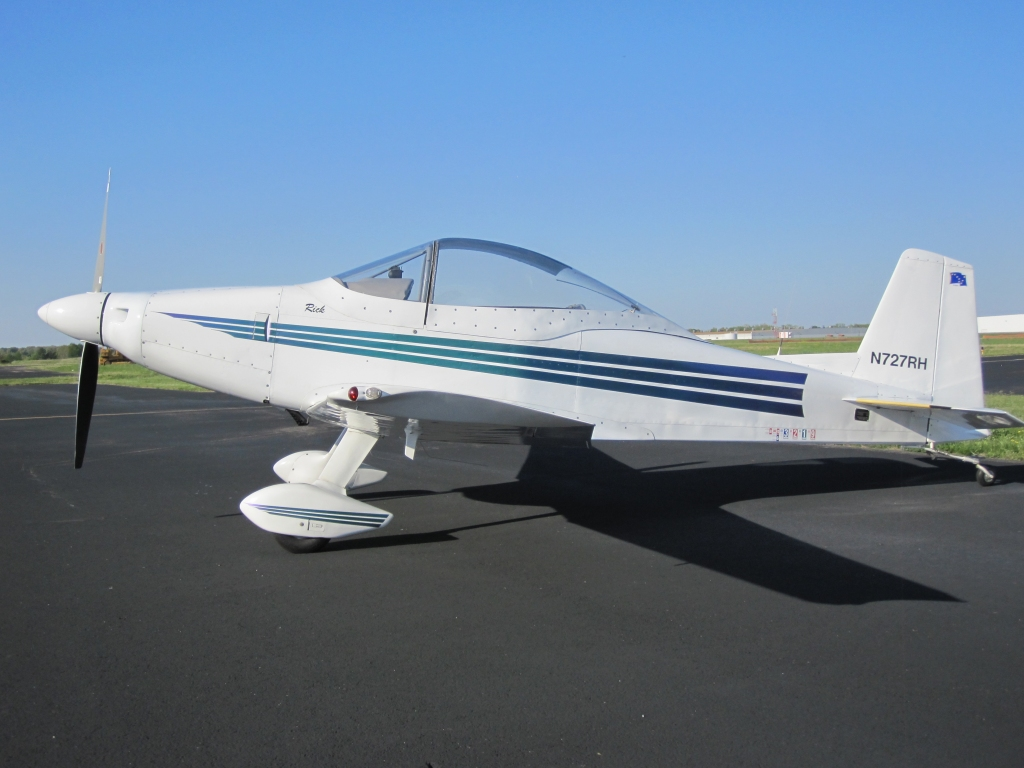
- Mustang II

General information
- Type: Aerobatic sports plane
- Manufacturer: Mustang Aeronautics for Homebuilding
- Designer: Robert Bushby
- Status: In production (2015)

History
- Manufactured: 480 (2011)
- First flight: 9 July 1966

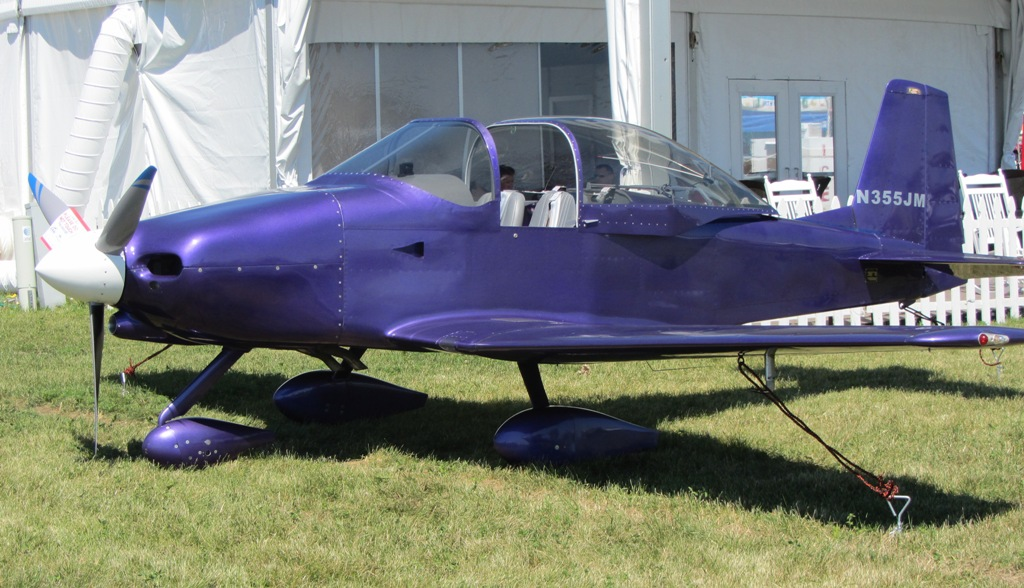
A tri-gear Mustang II

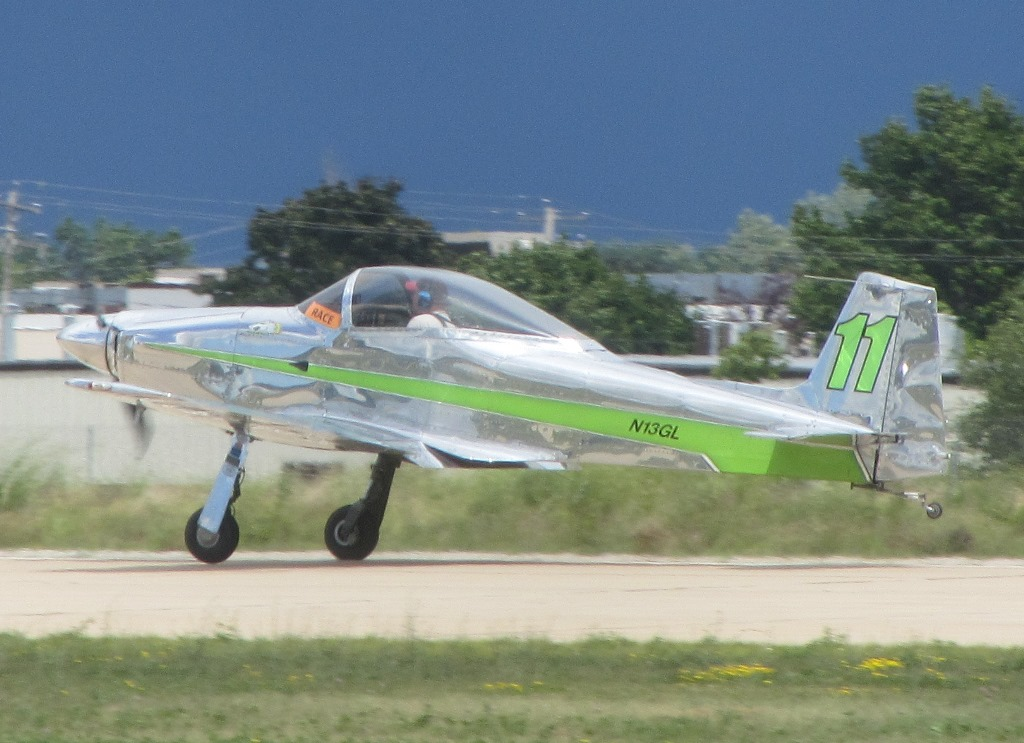
Mustang II Retractable Gear

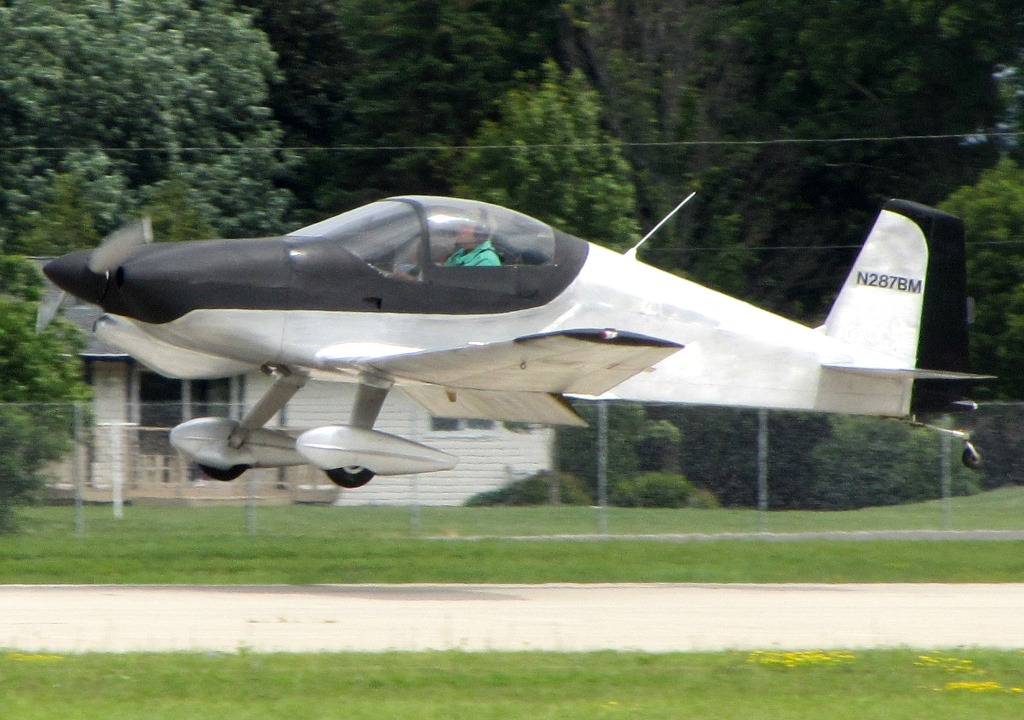
Bushby Mustang II landing

The Mustang Aeronautics Mustang II is a two-seat aerobatic sports airplane developed and marketed in the United States for homebuilding.

== Design and development ==
Robert Bushby acquired the rights to the Long Midget Mustang in 1959 and four years later began development of a two-seat, side-by-side version. This eventually flew in 1966 and plans were made available soon thereafter. Rights to both the Midget Mustang and the Mustang II were sold to Mustang Aeronautics in 1992. A single engine in tractor configuration airplane, the Mustang II features cantilever low-wing, two-seats-in-side-by-side configuration enclosed cockpit under a bubble canopy, fixed conventional landing gear, or, optionally, tricycle landing gear.

The aircraft is made from riveted sheet aluminum with a rounded turtle deck and flat sides and bottom skins. Its 24.2 ft (7.4 m) span wing employs a NACA 64A212 airfoil at the wing root, transitioning to a NACA 64A210 at the wingtip. Standard engines used include the 150 to 160 hp (112 to 119 kW) Lycoming O-320, the 180 hp (134 kW) Lycoming O-360 and the fuel-injected 200 hp (149 kW) Lycoming IO-360 four-stroke powerplants. Standard fuel capacity is 25 US gallons, but optional wet wings increase the fuel capacity to 61 US gallons. Several other fuel tank options are available. A folding wing option may be installed.

== Specifications ==
General characteristics

- Crew: One pilot
- Capacity: 1 passenger (2 total)
- Length: 19 ft 6 in (5.94 m)
- Wingspan: 24 ft 2 in (7.37 m)
- Height: 5 ft 3 in (1.60 m)
- Wing area: 97 sq ft (9.0 m^{2})
- Empty weight: 927 lb (420 kg)
- Gross weight: 1,500 lb (680 kg)
- Powerplant: 1 × Lycoming O-320 air-cooled horizontally-opposed four-cylinder engine , 160 hp (120 kW)

Performance

- Maximum speed: 230 mph (370 km/h, 200 kn)
- Range: 430 mi (692 km, 370 nmi)
- Service ceiling: 21,000 ft (6,400 m)

== See Also ==
Related development

- Mustang Aeronautics Midget Mustang

Aircraft of comparable role, configuration, and era

- Jeffair Barracuda
- Thorp T-18
- Stits SA-11A Playmate
- Smyth Sidewinder
- Stoddard-Hamilton Glasair II
- Van's Aircraft RV-6
