= Thomas Busby =

Thomas Busby may refer to:

- Thomas Busby (soldier) (1735–1798), Irish soldier
- Thomas Busby (composer) (1755–1838), English composer
- Thomas Lord Busby (1782–1838), English painter and engraver
- T. Jeff Busby (1884–1964), U.S. Representative from Mississippi
- Thomas Busby, Australian singer, songwriter and musician for blues and roots duo Busby Marou
- Thomas Busby, Australian guitarist, songwriter, and musician for rock band Luca Brasi
- Thomas Busby, the murderer alleged to have cursed a haunted chair

== See also ==
- Tom Busby (1936–2003), Canadian actor
