= Kathryn Busby =

American film executive

- Born: Kathryn Ann Busby; United States
- Other name: Kathy Busby
- Education: Harvard University
- Occupations: Film executive, film producer
- Years active: 1996–present
- Employer: Starz
- Relatives: Margaret Busby (aunt)
- Awards: Essence Black Women In Hollywood Award, 2024

Kathryn Ann Busby is an American film executive, who has been President of Original Programming at Starz since 2021. Previous positions she held include senior vice president of development at Sony Pictures Television Networks (SPT) and executive vice president of TriStar Television.

Sometimes credited as Kathy Busby, she is also a film producer. She was elected chair of the board of directors of BAFTA Los Angeles as of 2019, and in January 2022 was announced as chair of BAFTA's inaugural North America Board, in which role she was succeeded by Joyce Pierpoline in 2024.

== Biography ==
=== Education and early work ===
Busby attended Harvard University, where she was co-captain of Harvard's track team, and graduated magna cum laude with a B.A. degree in Visual and Environmental Studies. She worked in the record industry for several years as an executive at LaFace Records, Paisley Park Records, and MCA Records in London, UK.

=== Television career ===
Beginning a career in television, Busby was director of comedy development at Universal Television from 1996 to 1999.

From 1999 to 2005, she was senior vice president and head of development at Carsey-Werner, where she developed such television series as Whoopi, The Tracy Morgan Show, Game Over, and Grounded for Life. She was subsequently supervising producer for The Aisha Tyler Show and senior vice president of production at New Line Cinema, where she was executive producer on the 2008 film Sex and the City and senior executive on Rush Hour 3 (2007).

Busby worked for four years with Turner Broadcasting from 2010, as vice president of comedy development and vice president of TNT and TBS Originals, working on such shows as Black Box, Wedding Band and Sullivan & Son. In 2014, she joined Sony Pictures Television (SPT) Networks, where she was senior vice president of development, initiating and overseeing the sourcing, development and early production of original series around the world.

As senior vice president of the boutique production unit Gemstone Studios, she spearheaded the development and production of drama series such as Absentia, and oversaw the development of such projects as the local-language original series Ultraviolet and the series Carter (starring Jerry O'Connell and Sydney Poitier Heartsong), until in January 2020 being named executive vice president of TriStar Television, a division of SPT, where she was involved with notable projects such as The Afterparty, starring Tiffany Haddish and Sam Richardson.

In November 2021, it was announced that Busby would be leaving the Sony television label to become President of Original Programming at Starz, succeeding Christina Davis.

In January 2022, Busby was elected Chair of the inaugural BAFTA North America Board, after BAFTA united its New York and Los Angeles entities. She was succeeded in the role in 2024 by Joyce Pierpoline.

=== Other activities ===
Also a filmmaker, Busby's work includes having directed, produced and co-written the short film Max and Josh (2006), which premiered at the Sundance Film Festival, and the 2004 comedy short My Purple Fur Coat (winner of a Best Children's Short award at the Houston Black Film Festival). She co-authored with Neena Beber the original screenplay Her Gal Friday, which was optioned at ABC's Freeform channel.

Busby is on the Los Angeles board of directors for the British Academy of Film and Television Arts (BAFTA), of which she was elected deputy chair in January 2018, and chair in December 2018. She is also on the Board of Directors of PACE (Philanthropy and Community Engagement).

Busby features in the 1999 book by Julian C. R. Okwu As I Am: Young African American Women in a Critical Age. She is the niece of British publisher Margaret Busby.

== Honors and recognition ==
In May 2021, Busby was the recipient of a Dream Keeper Award from the I Have a Dream Foundation - Los Angeles, and in November 2023 she was honored by the Girl Scouts of Greater Los Angeles with a Changemaker Award for her championship of female leadership.

In December 2022, Busby was named on The Hollywood Reporter's Women in Entertainment Power 100 list.

In March 2024, she was an honoree, alongside Danielle Brooks, Halle Bailey and Nkechi Okoro Carroll, at Essence magazine's 17th annual Black Women In Hollywood Awards, and "emphasized that throughout her life, she learned a valuable lesson of not accepting the circumstances in front of her from her mom, aunt and grandmother....'They marched ahead because they didn't believe in limitations, and neither do I,' she said." Asked the question "What do Black Women In Hollywood deserve?" by Kathleen Newman-Bremang, Busby replied: "We need to tell our stories and put them out in the world. I feel very grateful to have come up the ranks to a position of power where I really can have a say at what kind of stories are told."

In June 2026, Busby was announced as recipient of the TV Vanguard Award "in honor of her work shaping some of TV's most ambitious and culturally relevant programming".
