= John Suppe =

American geologist

John Suppe (born 1942) is an American geologist who is Distinguished Professor of Geology at University of Houston and Princeton University.

== Biography ==
He received his B.A. from University of California, Riverside in 1965, and his Ph.D. from Yale University in 1969. He joined the Princeton faculty in 1971, and was the chairman of the Department of Geology from 1991 to 1993. He transferred to emeritus status, and moved to Taiwan where he became a Distinguished Chair Research Professor at the National Taiwan University in 2007.

Suppe's research specialties are structural geology and tectonics, and he is best known for his work on "fault-related folding" theories with his two classical papers "Geometry and kinematics of fault-bend folding" and "Geometry and kinematics of fault-propagation folding". Additionally, Suppe is also well known for his extensive work on the formation of mountain belts with examples from California, Taiwan, and China.

Suppe has been former visiting professor at the National Taiwan University, the California Institute of Technology, the University of Barcelona, and LMU Munich. Furthermore, he was a NASA Guest Investigator for the analysis of the Venus images from the Magellan mission.

Suppe is also a Christian who has written on the relationship between science and religion in articles like Thoughts on the Epistemology of Christianity in Light of Science.

== Awards and honors ==
Among his awards and honors, he received the Best Publication Award in Structural Geology and Tectonics from the Geological Society of America in 1986 and 1996, the Alexander von Humboldt Foundation research prize in 2006, the Wilbur Lucius Cross Medal from the Yale Graduate School in 2007 and the Career Contribution Award in Structural Geology and Tectonics from the Geological Society of America in 2008. Suppe has been a member of the United States National Academy of Sciences since 1995. In 2019, Suppe was named a Fellow of the American Geophysical Union.
