= Jason Saleeby =

American geologist

- Born: 1948; California, United States
- Died: January 16, 2023; California, United States
- Education: UC Santa Barbara, PhD
- Scientific career
- Fields: Geology; Mineralogy; Tectonics
- Workplaces: California Institute of Technology
- Thesis: (1975)

Jason B. Saleeby, (1948 – January 16, 2023) was an American geologist and university professor.

== Life ==
He earned his bachelor's degree from California State University, Northridge, in 1972. He later completed his doctorate from UC Santa Barbara in 1975.

He joined Caltech as an assistant professor in 1978, became tenured faculty in 1988, and retired in 2015.

He was one of the most cited scholars in the field of Geology.

He died on 16 January 2023. He was survived by his wife, Zorka, and his son, Inyo.

== Awards and honors ==
He is the recipient of the 2012 Distinguished Geologic Career Award from the Mineralogy, Geochemistry, Petrology, & Volcanology Division of GSA.

He has received a fellowship from the Alfred P. Sloan Foundation.
