= Mustang Aeronautics Midget Mustang =

American homebuilt sportsplane

Midget Mustang
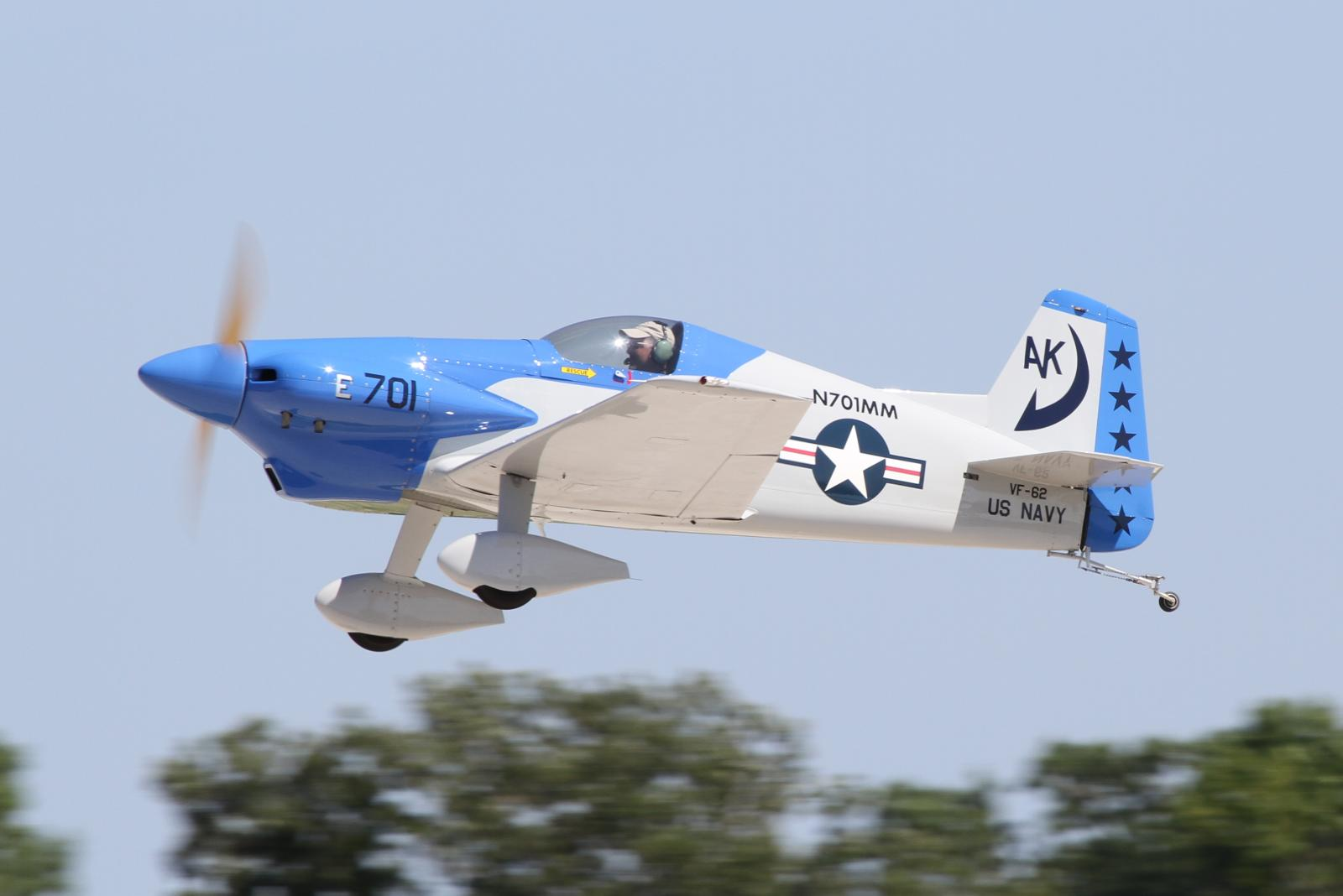
- MM-1 at EAA AirVenture in Oshkosh, Wisconsin

General information
- Type: Aerobatic sports plane
- Manufacturer: Mustang Aeronautics for Homebuilding
- Designer: David Long
- Status: In production (2015)
- Number built: 435 (2011)

History
- First flight: 1948

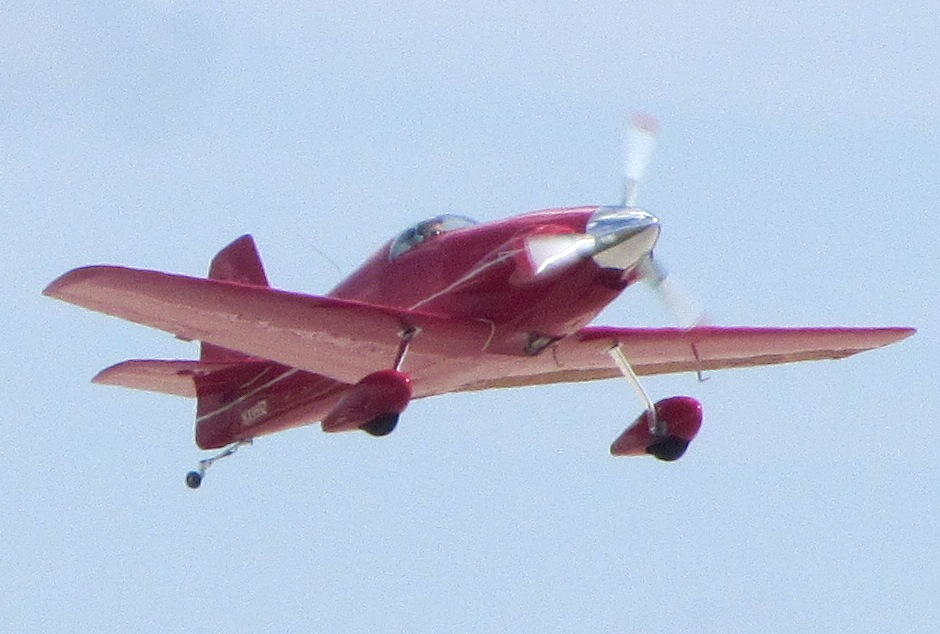
Midget Mustang

The Mustang Aeronautics Midget Mustang MM-1 is a single-seat aerobatic sports airplane developed and marketed in the United States for homebuilding. It was first known as the Long Midget. It was the predecessor to the Mustang II which is also known as the Bushby Mustang. Rights to both the Midget Mustang and the Mustang II were sold to Mustang Aeronautics in 1992.

== Development ==
It is a low-wing cantilever monoplane of metal construction, primarily of 2024-T3 aluminum and most are fitted with fixed tailwheel undercarriage. Developed by Piper engineer David Long in 1948, plans for production by Schweizer were underway at the time of Long's death two years later. All rights and tooling were purchased by Bert Wilcut in 1955 and he renamed the Long Midget to Midget Mustang. Wilcut tried to mass-produce the airplane, but ran short of capital required. He then sold all rights to Robert Bushby in 1959, who built a 90 hp Continental-powered example and sold plans and kits until 1992 when the rights were sold to Mustang Aeronautics. The Midget Mustang design being marketed in 2016 is similar to the original, with the option of building it with a bubble canopy in place of the straight line of the upper tailcone and hinged canopy of Long's original design, making it an M-IA.

Construction requires about 1000 hours of builder time.

== Operational history ==
The Midget Mustang was intended for air racing. David Long designed an aircraft for a friend to be used in the Cleveland Air Race in 1948. That aircraft was built by Long and was named "Pea Shooter". The Midget Mustang was only moderately successful as a race plane. However, its appearance and desirable flight characteristics made it an ideal sport plane. At the Cleveland Race, racers competed in aircraft with names like Mammy, Miss Fort Worth, and Slo Poke. Over time, air racers modified the aircraft to reach 181 mph (291 km/h) speeds in competition. Nowadays, the Midget Mustang can cruise at 240 mph.

== Variants ==
Midget Mustang
"GG"
A tricycle gear modification
Graham Super Midget
Features a manually retracted landing gear.

== Specifications (MM-1-125) ==
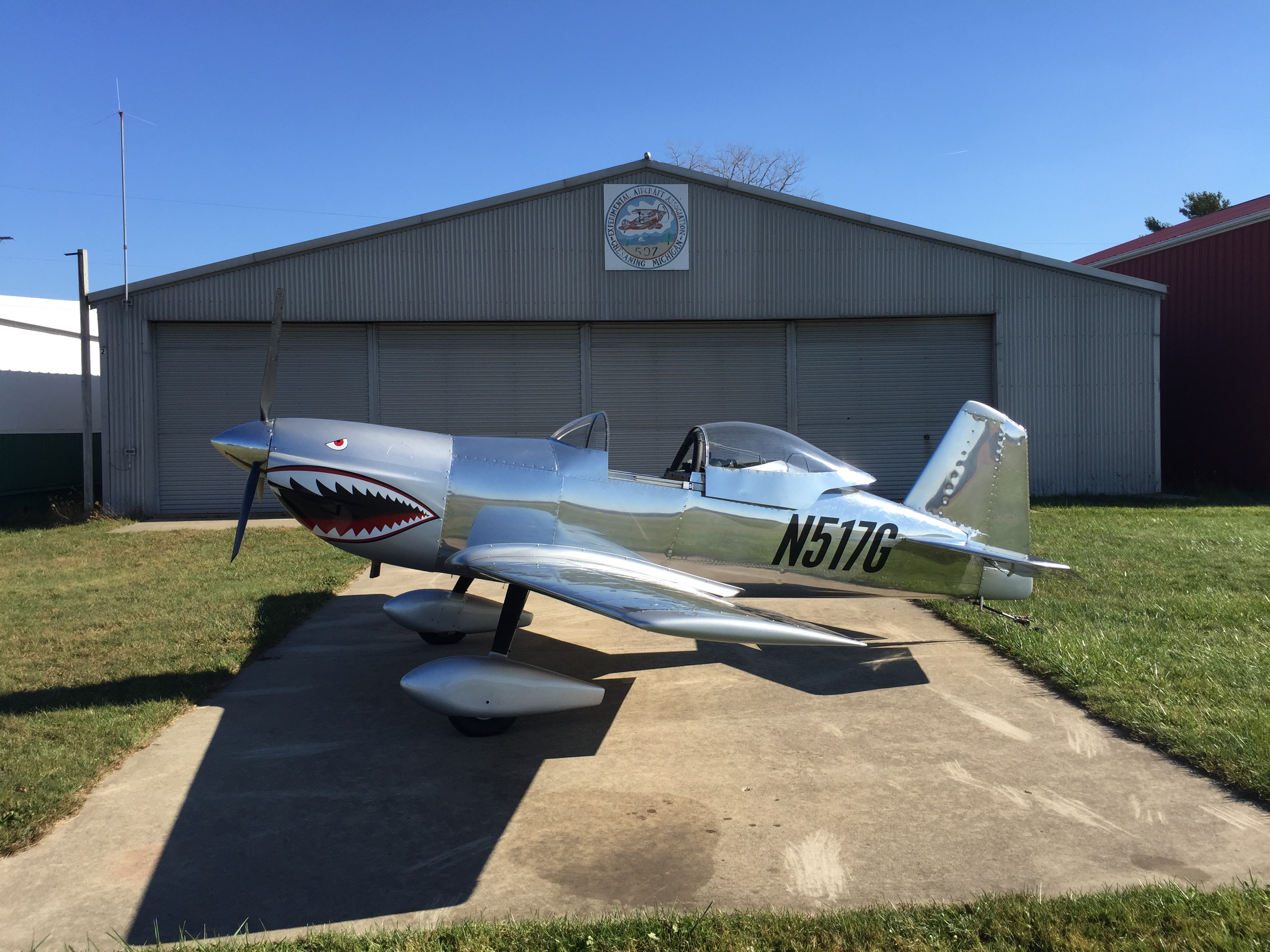
Midget Mustang N517G, taken at 50G airport in Michigan.

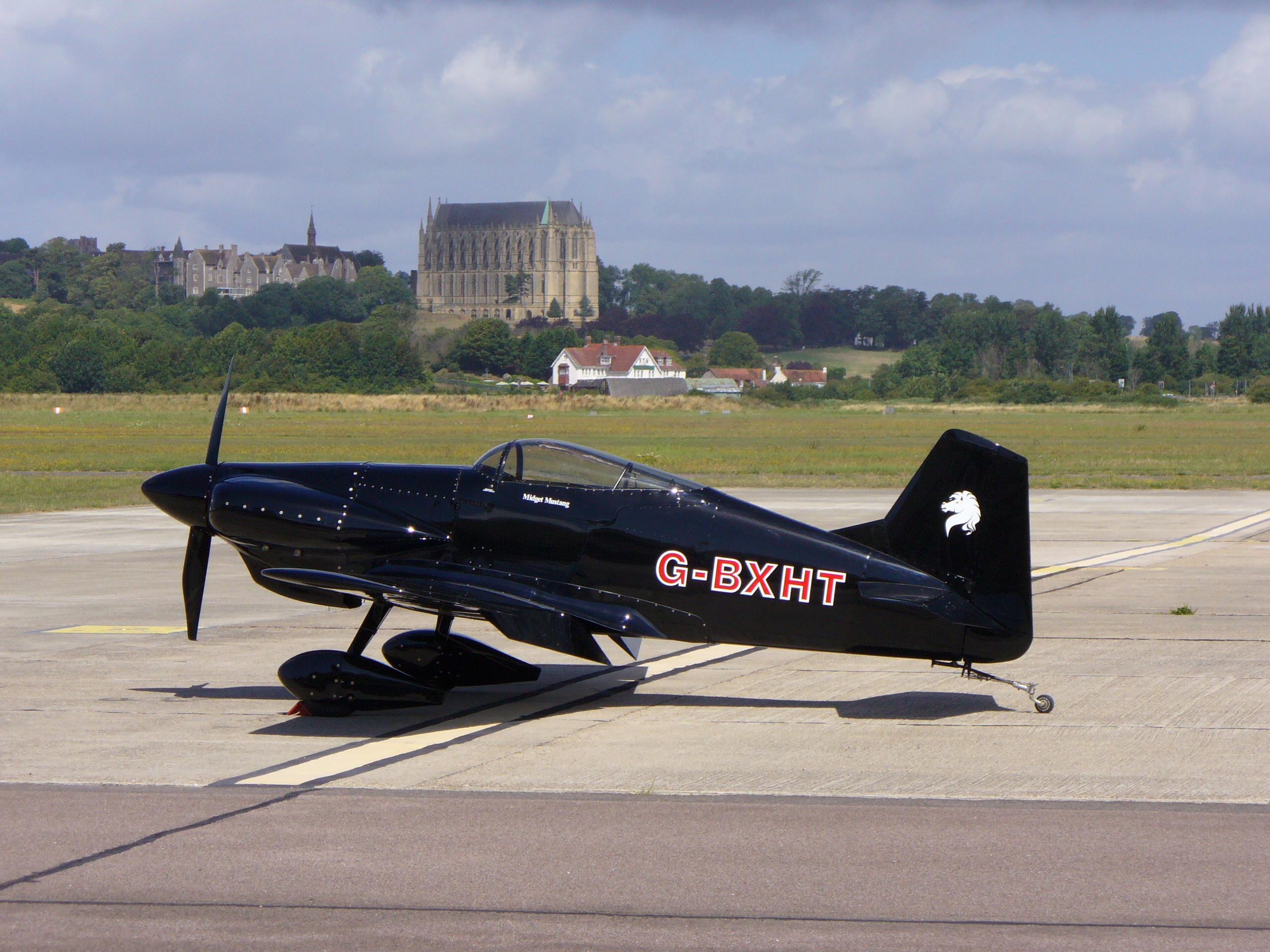
Midget Mustang

Data from Jane's All The World's Aircraft 1982–83

General characteristics

- Crew: One pilot
- Length: 16 ft 5 in (5.00 m)
- Wingspan: 18 ft 6 in (5.64 m)
- Height: 4 ft 6 in (1.37 m)
- Wing area: 68 sq ft (6.32 m^{2})
- Empty weight: 590 lb (268 kg)
- Gross weight: 900 lb (408 kg)
- Powerplant: 1 × Lycoming O-290-D2 , 135 hp (101 kW)

Performance

- Maximum speed: 225 mph (362 km/h, 196 kn)
- Cruise speed: 165 mph (265 km/h, 143 kn)
- Range: 375 mi (603 km, 326 nmi)
- Service ceiling: 19,000 ft (5,790 m)
- Rate of climb: 2,200 ft/min (11.2 m/s)

== See also ==
Aircraft of comparable role, configuration, and era

- Mustang Aeronautics Mustang II
- Nexus Mustang
