= Robert Bushby =

American aircraft mechanic and aviator (1927–2018)

Robert 'Bob' Bushby
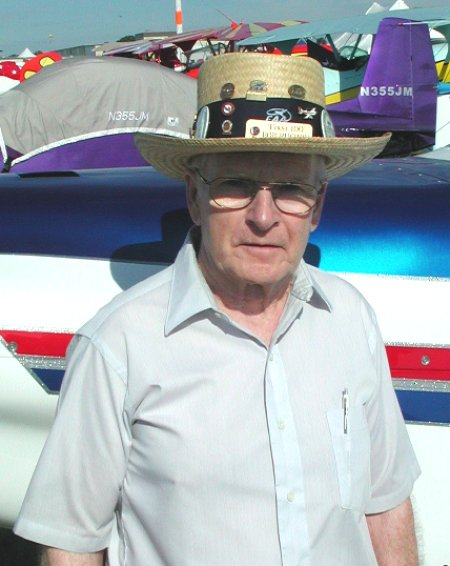
- Robert 'Bob' Bushby in 2002
- Born: February 24, 1927; Joliet, Illinois, U.S.
- Died: October 14, 2018 (aged 91); Joliet, Illinois, U.S.
- Education: Lewis College in Lockport, IL
- Occupations: Aircraft mechanic, designer
- Known for: Designer of the Bushby Mustang II experimental airplane
- Spouse: Sharon Bushby
- Children: Wesley, Paula, Sandra

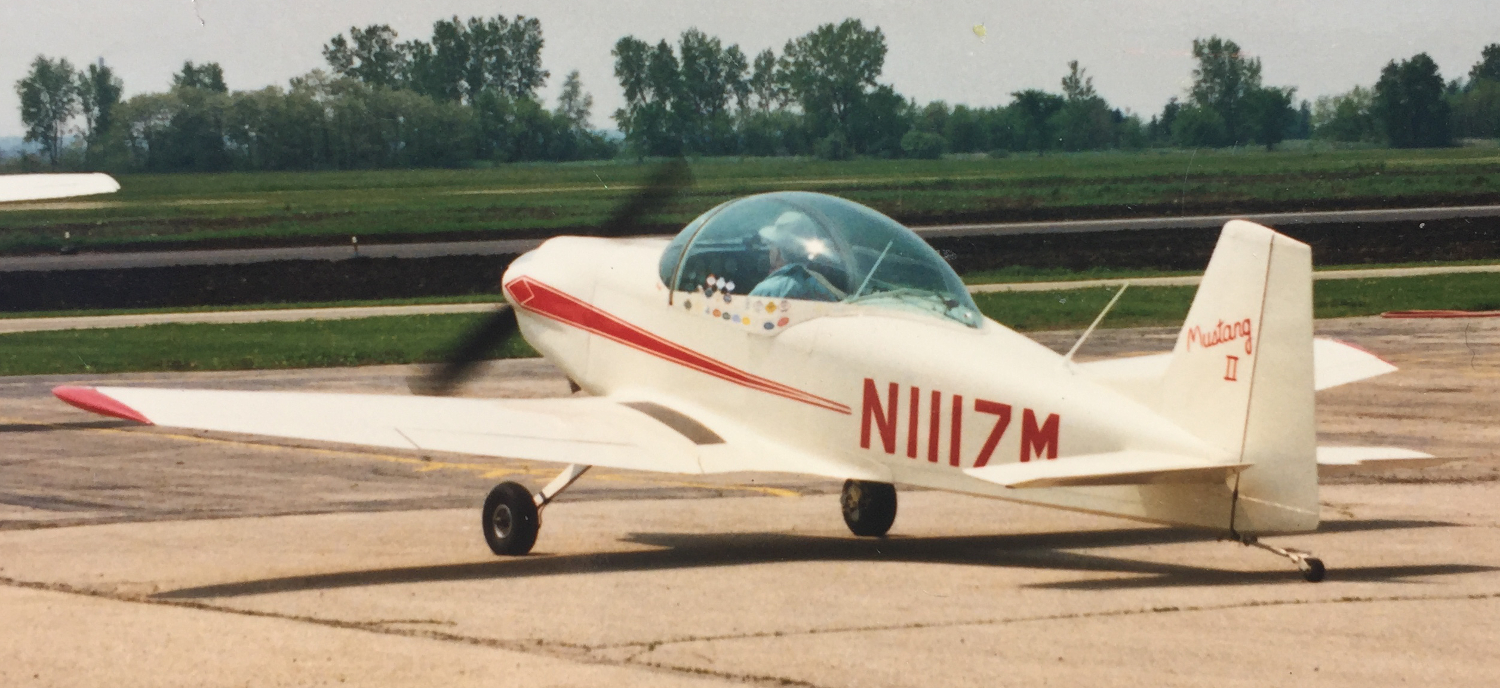
N1117M Bushby Mustang II prototype

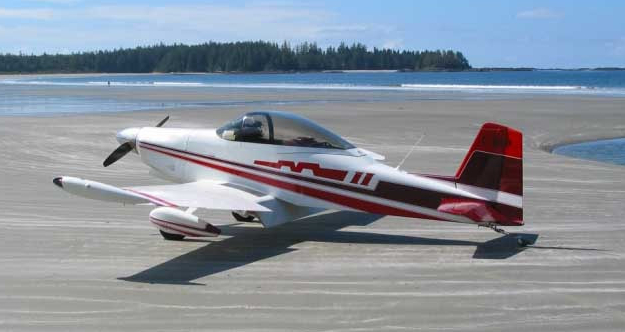
Mustang II C-GAIF

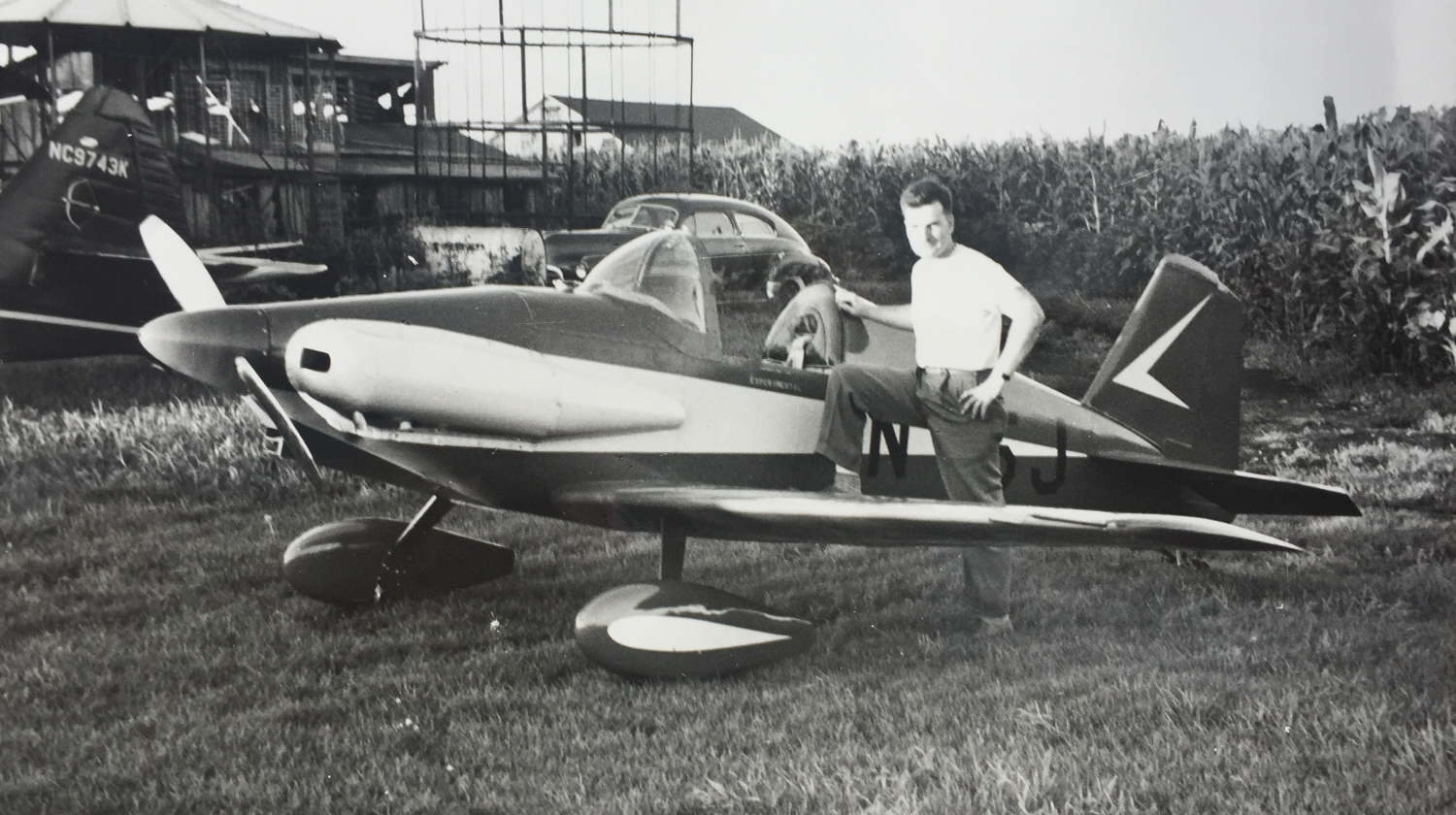
Midget Mustang N15J

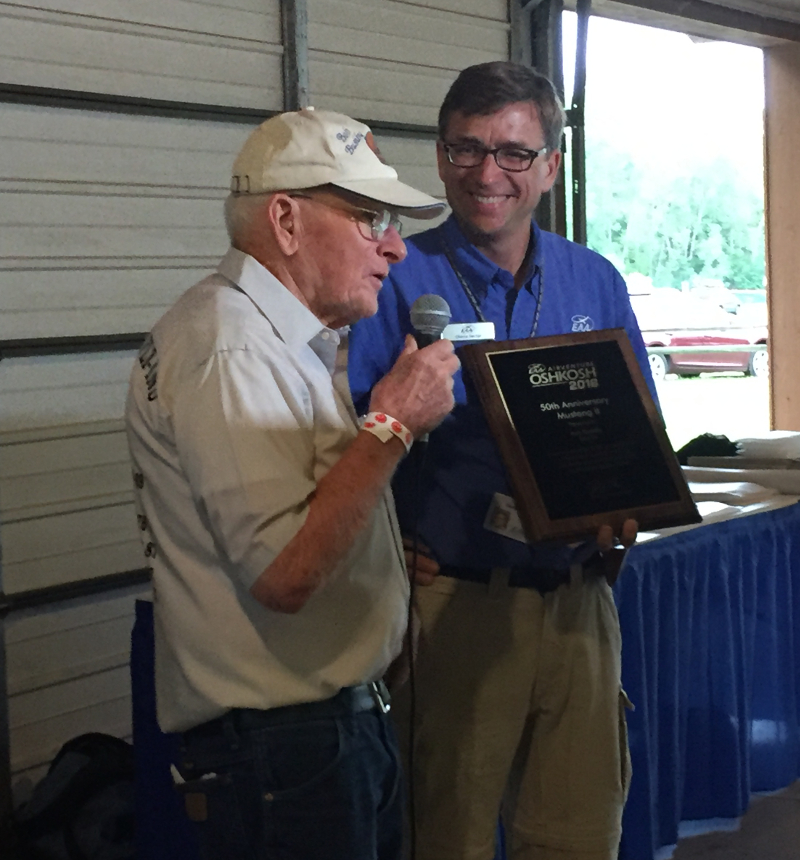
Robert Bushby award at OSH

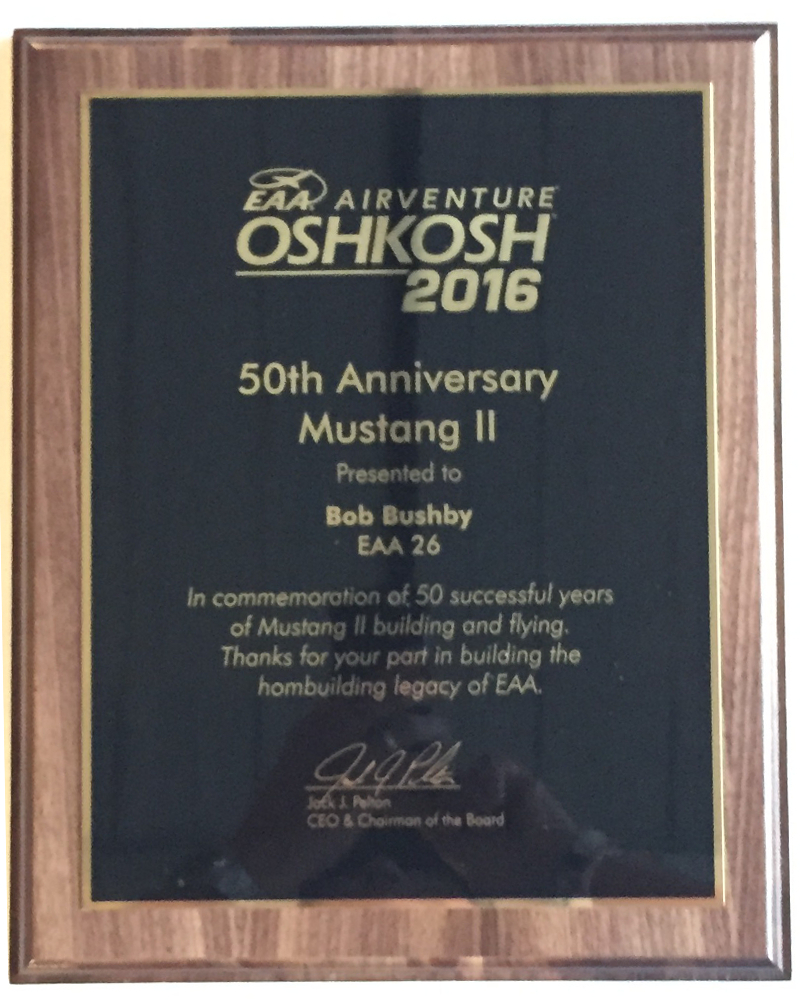
Robert Bushby plaque

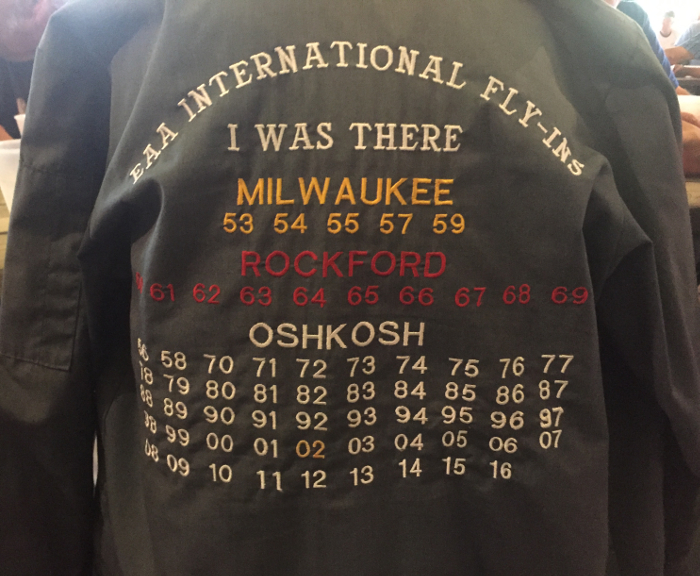
Bob's shirt showing years of EAA conventions attended

Robert Wesley Bushby (February 24, 1927 – October 14, 2018) was an American aircraft mechanic and aviator who designed the Bushby Mustang II, later called the Mustang Aeronautics Mustang II. He was born in Joliet, Illinois, and started to learn to fly while in high school in Minooka, Illinois.

== Life and career ==
Bob's interest in airplanes started in grade school and at age ten he had his first airplane ride in a Ford Trimotor. His family moved to Minooka, Illinois, in 1941. His first solo flight was in a Piper J-3 Cub in 1943 and he graduated from high school in 1944. During his military service he attended aircraft maintenance school at Keesler Field in Biloxi, Mississippi, followed by time on Guam in the 4th Emergency Rescue Squadron as a B-17 Flight engineer. In 1948 Bob graduated from the Lewis College in Lockport, Illinois, aircraft maintenance course as an A&E mechanic (now referred to as "A&P" for Airframe and Powerplant) and later added the Inspection Authorization rating. In 1950 he earned his Commercial pilot license and in 1954, his Multi-engine rating. From 1955 until 1970 Bob worked for the Sinclair Oil Co. in their engine research laboratory. Bushby died on October 14, 2018, in Joliet, Illinois. He was 91.

== EAA ==
Bob was one of the original founders of the Experimental Aircraft Association in 1953, with EAA number 26. He is Technical Counselor number 20 and has attended every EAA national convention from 1953 through 2016. Bob was an early member of EAA Chapter 15, in 1956 was instrumental in forming EAA Chapter 95 and later contributed to the formation of EAA Chapter 260. He conducted metal aircraft building forums at the Rockford and Oshkosh EAA fly-ins for 25 years.

== Mustangs ==
The FAA pre-cover inspection of the first wing of his prototype Midget Mustang was January, 1953. Bob built his prototype version of the Midget, N15J, and first flew it on September 9, 1959. In 1959 he purchased the rights to the Midget Mustang and began to sell prints for the M-I. In San Antonio, Texas, he built six Midget Mustang aircraft. In 1963 he began work on a two place design based on the Midget Mustang. In 1965 the first ever Mustang II (N1117M) was brought to the EAA convention at Rockford (by trailer) and in 1966 the prototype was flown to the convention. For the next 26 years Bushby Aeronautics sold plans and kits for the Mustang II. In March, 1992 Mustang Aeronautics, Inc. acquired the design rights from Robert Bushby for both the Midget Mustang and Mustang II aircraft. At the Homebuilder's Dinner at EAA AirVenture Oshkosh 2016, Bob received special recognition from the EAA commemorating 50 successful years of his Mustang II design.

== Awards ==
- 1966 - Outstanding Design award (Third place) for Mustang II
- 1967 - August Raspet award
- 1973 - August Raspet award
- 1986 - Stan Dzik award
- 1992 - Charles Taylor Master Mechanic Award
- 2005 - Wright Brothers Master Pilot Award
- 2016 - Recognition for his Mustang II design flying for 50 years
