= Texas Air Museum – Stinson Chapter =

Aviation museum in San Antonio Texas

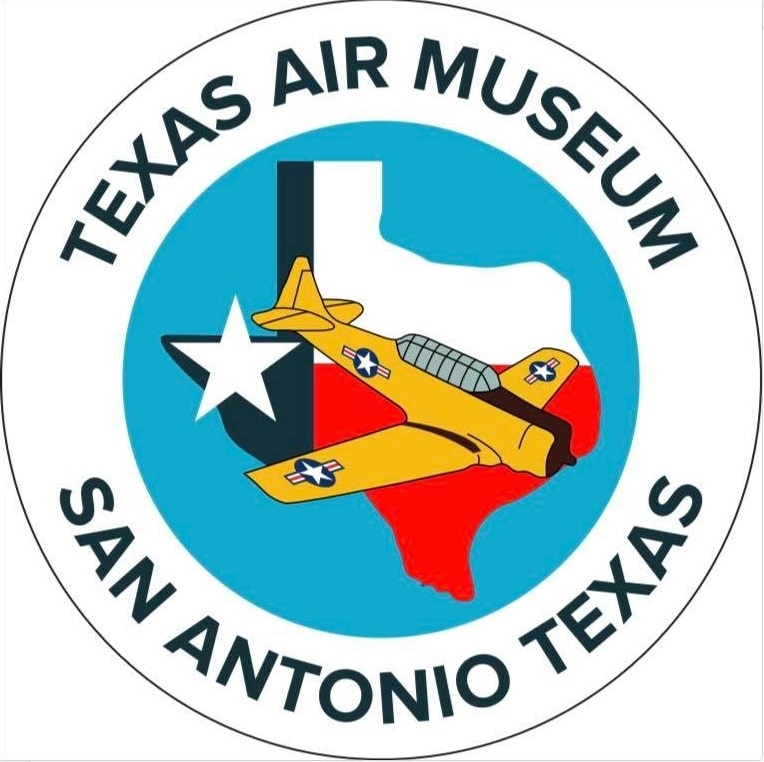
- Texas Air Museum - Stinson Chapter logo

- Location of the Texas Air Museum – Stinson Chapter
- Established: 12 November 1999
- Location: San Antonio, Texas
- Coordinates: 29.33993°N 98.47597°W
- Type: Aviation museum
- Collection size: 26 planes, 6 replicas, and 1 helicopter
- Founder: John Douglas Tosh
- Director: John Douglas Tosh
- Website: www.texasairmuseum.org

The Texas Air Museum – Stinson Chapter is an aviation museum located at the Stinson Municipal Airport six miles south of downtown San Antonio, Texas. The museum has many static aircraft, along with several rare examples under restoration.

== History ==
The original Texas Air Museum opened in 1985 and operated out of Rio Hondo, Texas, by founder John Houston with his wife and son. In 1993, a second Texas Air Museum was opened in the City of Slaton on the Larry T. Neal Memorial Airport near Lubbock, Texas. The third Texas Air Museum, located on Stinson Municipal Airport, was founded by John Douglas Tosh, a World War II veteran, on October 9, 1999. The original Rio Hondo museum closed its operations in 2002, and this museum's assets were divided between the Slaton and Stinson museums.

The museum is focused on the aviation history of San Antonio and Texas. It covers aviation pioneers, including the co-founders of Stinson Airport Katherine Stinson, her sister Marjorie Stinson and brother Edward Stinson. The museum also highlights technical achievements in aviation and military aviators.

== Collection ==
The museum's newest collection of aircraft to be restored includes one Stinson Model R, one SM-8A Stinson Junior, one PT-23, one PT-26, one AT-17 Bobcat, two PT-19, one frame of 1928 Heath Parasol and one Fairchild Swearingen Metroliner. All these projects were received in October 2023.

The museum's newest library collection is photographs from John W. Underwood with a few photos of Stinson Model R aircraft. One Model R belonging to American aviator and air racer Arlene Davis.

On display are sweetheart pillowcases from various World War II military installations in Texas.

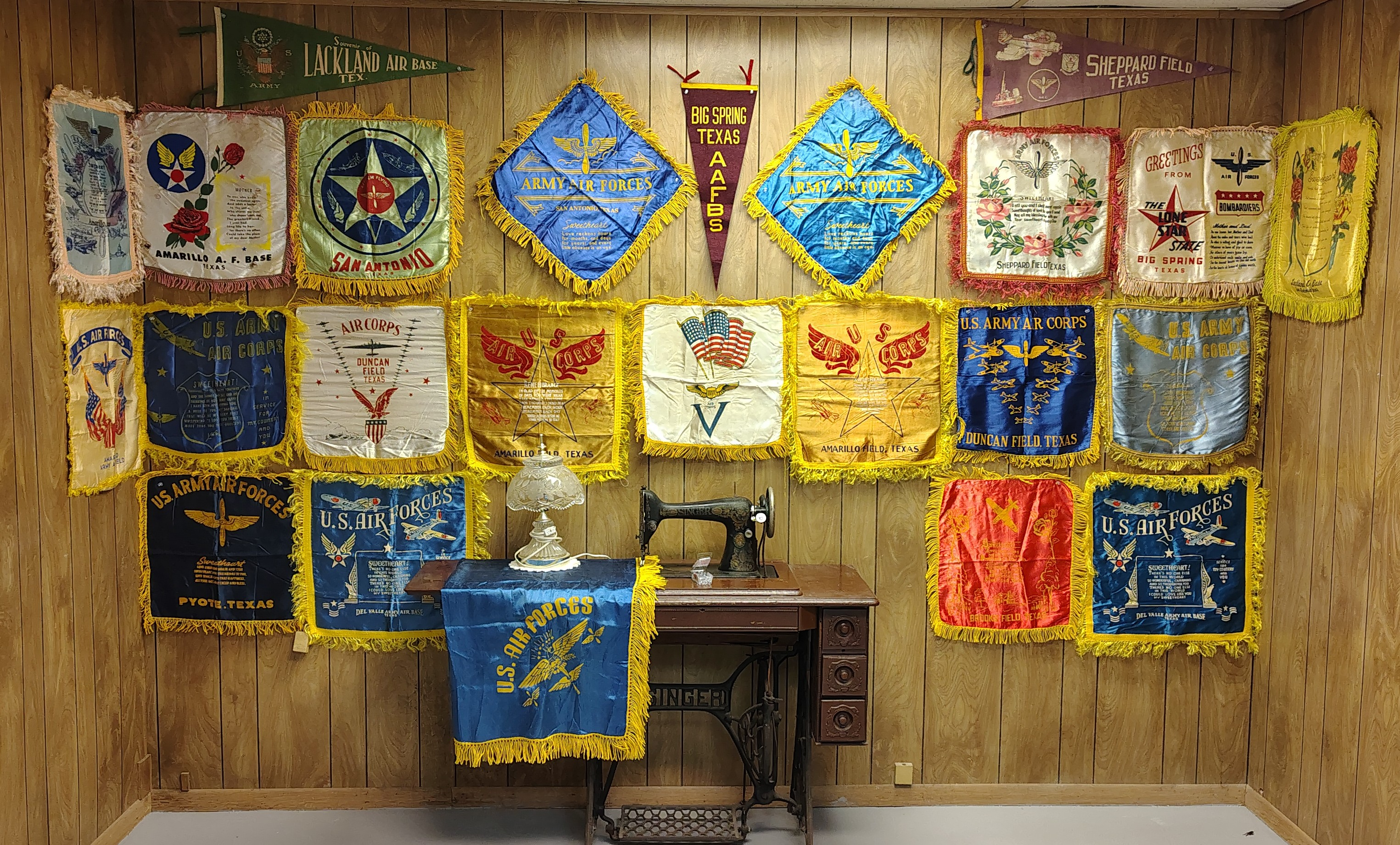
Sweetheart pillowcases from various World War II installations in Texas.

=== Aircraft on display ===
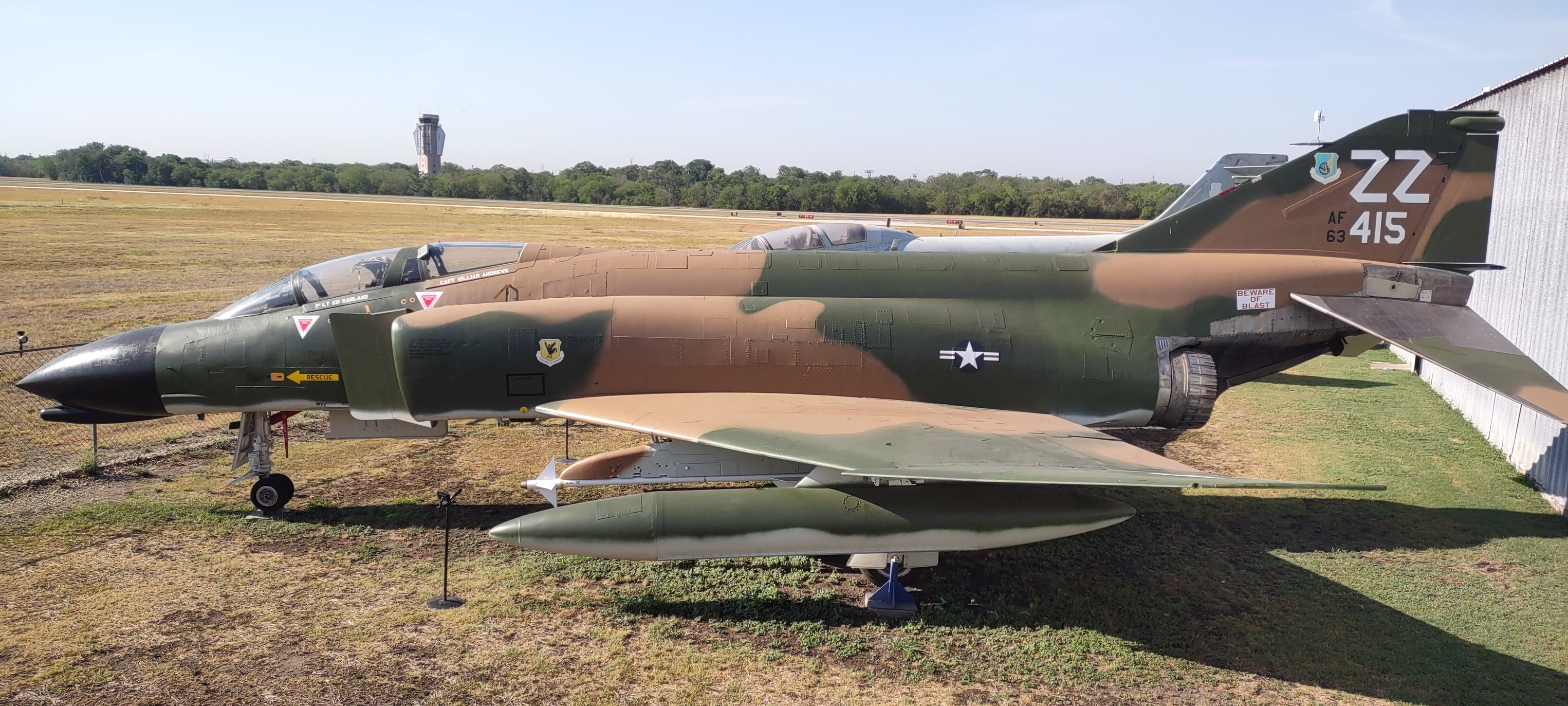
McDonnell F-4C Phantom II

- Blériot XI – scale replica
- Boeing P-26 Peashooter – scale replica
- Curtiss Model D – scale replica
- Curtiss Pusher – scale replica
- Dyke Delta JD-2
- Eichmann Aerobat IA NX17638
- Fairchild Swearingen Merlin IVC Expediter N566UP
- Funk B85C N77712
- Masoncraft
- McDonnell F-4C Phantom II 63-7415
- McDonnell F-101 Voodoo 59-0421
- Northrop F-89B Scorpion 49-2434
- Pietenpol Air Camper N36RN
- Piper J3C-65 Cub NC32851
- Piper PA-22 Tri-Pacer N4782A
- Roe IV Triplane – scale replica
- Sikorsky HUS-1A Seahorse 145728
- Skyjacker Super Sport N32765
- Spinks Akromaster N31SA
- Stolp SA-500 Starlet N808JR
- V-1 flying bomb – scale replica
- Waco GXE NC7970
- Wilcut Palomino N64TT

=== Aircraft in storage ===
- Cessna AT-17 Bobcat 42-58380
- Fairchild PT-19 42-34440
- Fairchild PT-19 42-34446
- Fairchild PT-19 42-34563
- Fairchild PT-23
- Fairchild PT-26 44-19262
- Heath CA-1 Parasol
- Stinson Model R NC12159
- Stinson SM-8A N231W
- Vultee BT-13 Valiant

=== Engines on display ===
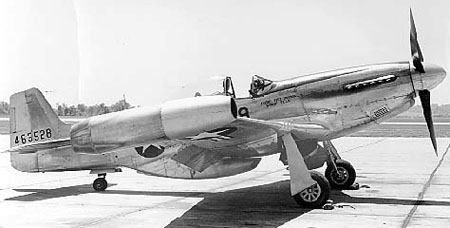
A North American P-51D Mustang with two XRJ-30 ramjets.

- Allison J35
- Allison T56 – Three different displays in stage completion order; bare T-56 on stand, T-56 with added propeller gear box on stand, and complete C-130 engine with cowlings mounted on ground support tow trailer.
- Continental R-670
- Continental W670-N
- Crosley CoBra
- Heath-Henderson B-4
- Jacobs R-755
- Kinner R-540
- Lycoming O-145
- Lycoming R-680
- Lycoming R-680-9
- Marquardt XRJ-30
- McCulloch O-100-1
- Pratt & Whitney J57
- Pratt & Whitney R-4360 Wasp Major
- Ranger L-440-1
- Westinghouse J34 – A set of J34-WE-36A removed from a Lockheed P-2 Neptune.
- Wright R-3350 Duplex-Cyclone
- Ramjet – Two small ramjets identical to McDonnell XH-20 Little Henry. One mounted on a main rotor blade, one in a stand.

=== Vehicles on display ===
- Clarktor 6
- Ford Model T Ambulance
- International L-170
- Willys-Overland CJ-3A
- M151 ¼-ton 4×4 utility truck
- Textron E-Z-GO Model 7997009 Hawk "Eagle 1"

== See also ==
- List of aviation museums
