= Stinson Model R =

American single-engine high-winged monoplane (1932)

Model R
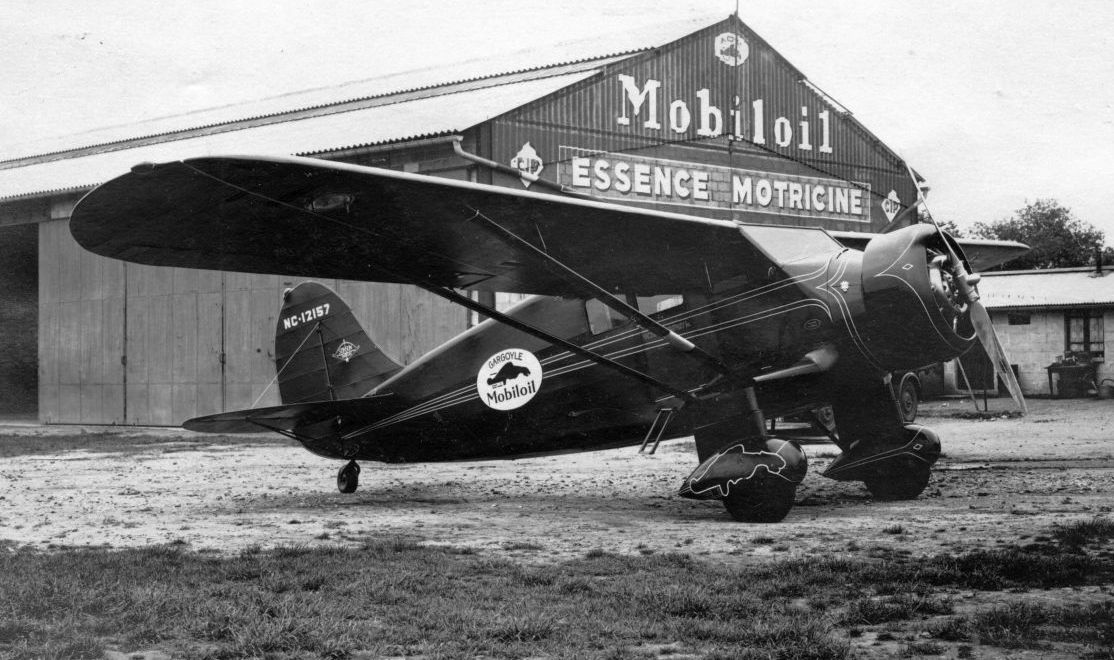

General information
- Type: Cabin monoplane
- National origin: United States of America
- Manufacturer: Stinson Aircraft Company
- Number built: 39

History
- First flight: 1931
- Developed from: Stinson Junior
- Variant: Stinson Reliant

The Stinson Model R was an American light aircraft built by the Stinson Aircraft Company in the early 1930s. It was a single-engine high-winged monoplane, developed from the Stinson Junior. 39 units were built.

== Design and development ==
In 1931, work began on a replacement for Stinson's SM-8 Junior four-seat light aircraft. The new design, the Model R, while based on the SM-8, had a shorter fuselage and a revised cabin. While the aircraft's undercarriage retained the basic tailwheel undercarriage layout of the SM-8, the split-axle mainwheels of the earlier aircraft were replaced by a semi-cantilever design, in which the mainwheels and shock-absorber units were enclosed in streamlined fairings attached to a short stub wing, which was also used to carry wing bracing struts. The aircraft had a fabric covered, welded steel-tube fuselage, while the wings were of mixed construction, with spruce spars and steel ribs, covered by fabric.

A retractable undercarriage was also designed for the Model R, with the mainwheels retracting upwards and inwards into the lower fuselage. This had less benefit to the aircraft's performance than was expected, however, and only a few aircraft were built with the retractable undercarriage. The aircraft was powered by a single Lycoming R-680 radial engine (Lycoming was controlled by the Cord Corporation, which also owned a controlling stake in Stinson, and so were the preferred powerplants for Stinson aircraft).

== Operational history ==
The prototype made its maiden flight, piloted by Edward Stinson, in autumn 1931 and was certified as airworthy on 25 January 1932. Stinson immediately set off on a sales tour with the prototype, and that same evening was carrying out a demonstration flight from Chicago when fuel shortage forced him down. Stinson was fatally injured in the resulting crash.

Production continued, but the Great Depression caused sales to be slow, and only 39 aircraft were built, including five Model R-3s fitted with retractable undercarriage. It was succeeded in production by the Stinson Reliant, which managed similar performance at much lower cost ($3995 compared with $5595 for the Model R and $6495 for the R-3).

== Variants ==
R
Basic model, powered by 215 hp (160 kW) Lycoming R-680 engine. 31 built (including prototype).
R-1
Proposed derivative of R with retractable undercarriage. Unbuilt.
R-2
Fitted with 240 hp (180 kW) Lycoming R-680BA engine, while retaining fixed undercarriage. Three built
R-3
Fitted with retractable undercarriage and R-680BA engine. Five built.
R-3S
Conversion of R-3 with 245 hp (183 kW) Lycoming R-680-6 engine.

== Surviving aircraft ==
- 8506 – In storage at the Western Antique Aeroplane & Automobile Museum in Hood River, Oregon.
- 8513 – Owned by Roy H. Parkman of San Antonio, Texas donated to the Texas Air Museum - Stinson Chapter.

== Specifications (Model R) ==
Data from General Dynamics Aircraft and their Predecessors

General characteristics

- Crew: 1
- Capacity: 3 passengers
- Length: 26 ft 1 in (7.95 m)
- Wingspan: 43 ft 3 in (13.18 m)
- Height: 8 ft 9 in (2.67 m)
- Wing area: 235 sq ft (21.8 m^{2})
- Empty weight: 2,225 lb (1,009 kg)
- Gross weight: 3,325 lb (1,508 kg)
- Powerplant: 1 × Lycoming R-680 9-cylinder radial engine, 215 hp (160 kW)

Performance

- Maximum speed: 130 mph (210 km/h, 110 kn)
- Cruise speed: 110 mph (180 km/h, 96 kn)
- Stall speed: 52 mph (84 km/h, 45 kn)
- Range: 450 mi (720 km, 390 nmi)
- Service ceiling: 12,500 ft (3,800 m)
- Rate of climb: 675 ft/min (3.43 m/s)
