= Stinson Detroiter =

American six-seat utility aircraft from 1926

Detroiter
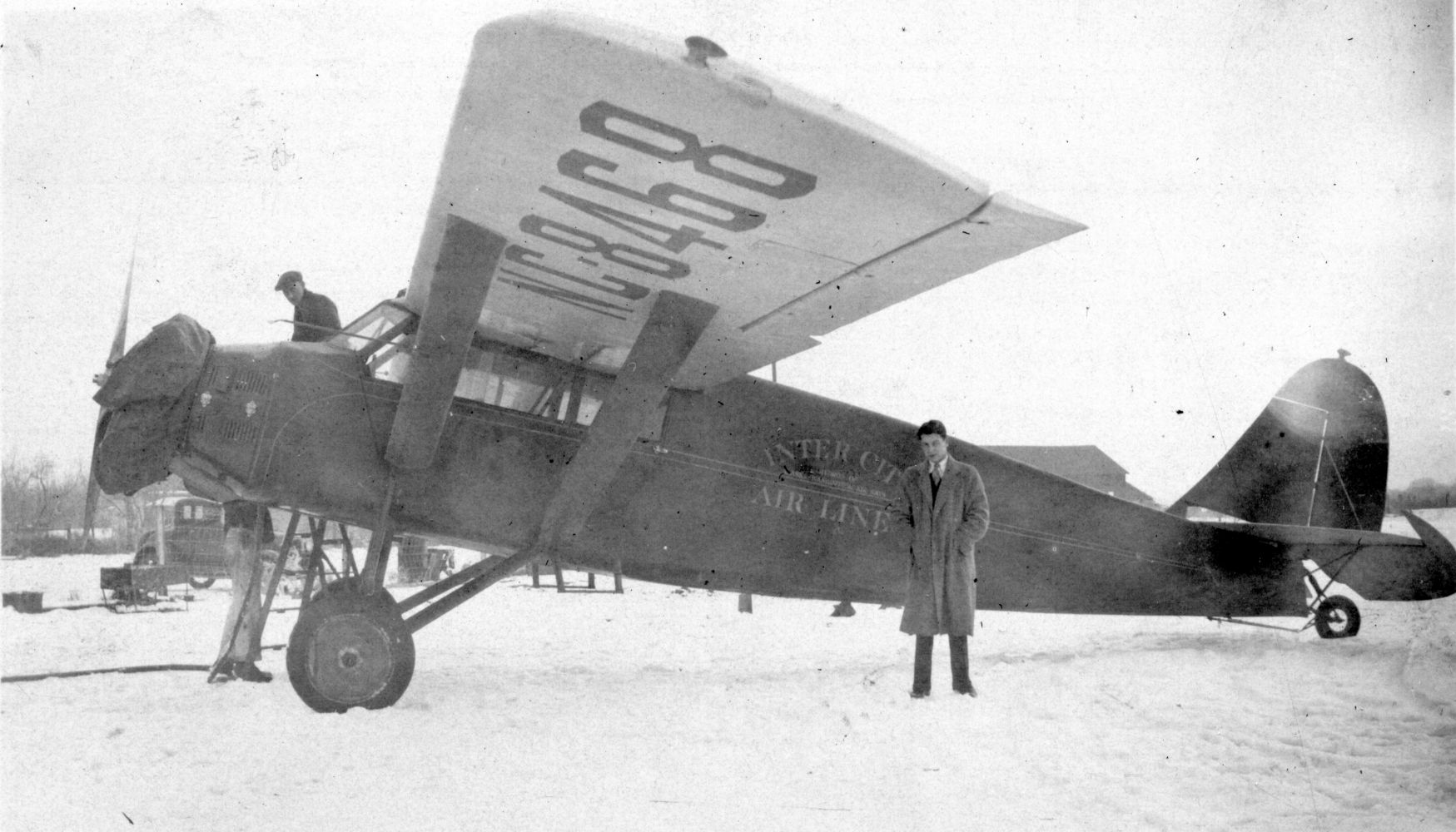
- Stinson SM-1F

General information
- Type: Utility monoplane
- National origin: United States
- Manufacturer: Stinson Aircraft Syndicate; Stinson Aircraft Company
- Number built: 100+

History
- First flight: 25 January 1926
- Developed into: Stinson Junior

The Stinson SM-1 Detroiter was a six-seat high-wing monoplane cabin airliner for passengers or freight designed and built by the Stinson Aircraft Company, later the Stinson Aircraft Corporation. It was based on Stinson's earlier SB-1 biplane.

== Development ==
The first design from the Detroit-based Stinson Aircraft Syndicate was the Stinson SB-1 Detroiter, a cabin biplane with novel features such as cabin heating, individual wheel brakes and electric starter for the nose-mounted 220 hp (164 kW) Wright J-5 Whirlwind engine. It made its first flight on January 25, 1926, with 26 aircraft following the prototype.

Eddie Stinson believed that a monoplane would be more popular and efficient than a biplane and so tasked William C. Naylor to design a monoplane derivative of the SB-1. The resulting design, the Stinson SM-1 Detroiter, had a fuselage based on that of the SB-1, but stretched to accommodate six seats, and a high mounted monoplane wing, and first flew in April 1927. The SM-1 made a number of significant long-range flights.

Seventy-five of the Wright J-5-powered versions were built, followed by 30 Wright J-6-powered aircraft. From 1928, SM-1 aircraft were used on scheduled services by Paul Braniff's Braniff Air Lines and by Northwest Airways.

Actress Elsie Mackay lost her life in 1928 while attempting an Atlantic crossing in an SM-1 she had named Endeavor.

In 1930 a SM-1FS with a crew of three reached Bermuda from New York City, the first flight ever to the islands. Getting there the aircraft had to land twice, once because of darkness and later after running out of fuel. With a wing strut damaged, it was shipped back to New York.

E.L. Cord's personal SM-7 was operated for several years during/after World War II by Western Air Express with (illegally) a 450 hp (340 kW) Pratt; subsequently restored in 1980–2020 with a legal 300 hp Lycoming R-680.

In 1928 Stinson developed the smaller SM-2 Junior model to appeal to private owners.

== Variants ==
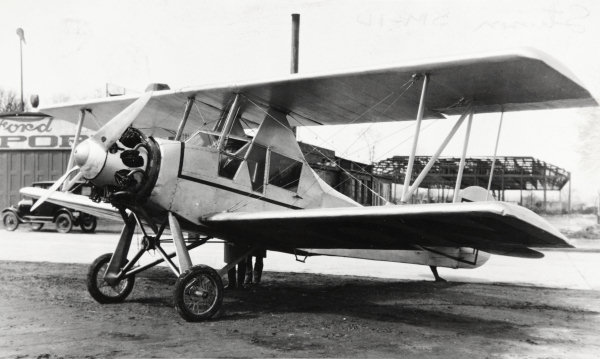
A Stinson SB-1 Detroiter biplane as originally built

Stinson SB-1 Detroiter
Biplane with a 200 hp (150 kW) Wright J-4 Whirlwind engine or a 220 hp (160 kW) J-5 Whirlwind. 26 built.

SM-1 and SM-1 Special (ATC 16, 2–174)
1927 high-wing monoplane with a 45 ft 10 in (13.97 m) wingspan and powered by a 220 hp (160 kW) Wright J-5 Whirlwind engine, seven built.
SM-1B (ATC 2-24, 2–224)
1928 variant with higher allowable loads. 36 built, some converted from SM-1s.
SM-1D/SM-1D-300 (ATC 60, 2-60, 2–142)
1929 conversion of SM-1D with 300 hp (220 kW) Wright J-6 as NS6762. One conversion.
SM-1DA (ATC 74)
1928 SM-1D development with detail improvements and slightly increased range. Five built.
SM-1DB (ATC 76)
1928 SM-1D development with minor interior alterations and allowable load increased to 1,978 lb (897 kg) from SM-1's 1,515 lb (687 kg). One built.
SM-1DC (ATC 77)
1928 SM-1D freighter with two seats and cargo-carrying interior.
SM-1DD (ATC 78)
1928 DC development but with greater load capacity for bush operations. One built.
SM-1DE
Freighter variant with two seats and cargo-carrying interior. One built.
SM-1DX (ATC 2–228)
1928 variant powered with a 225 hp (168 kW) Packard DR-980 Diesel engine, one built as NX7654 and first diesel powered aircraft to fly.
SM-1F (ATC 136)
1929 variant with a 300 hp (220 kW) Wright J-6 engine and longer 46 ft 8 in (14.22 m) span wing. Around 26 were built.
SM-1FS (ATC 212)
Floatplane variant of the SM-1F.
SM-2 Junior (ATC 48)
1928 scaled down development for private use with a wingspan of 41 ft 5 in (12.62 m), and various engines installed, including the 110 hp (82 kW) Warner Scarab, 165 hp (123 kW) and 225 hp (168 kW) Wright J-6, and 100 hp (75 kW) Kinner K-5.
SM-3
1927 retractable undercarriage development with new wing, one built, project cancelled due to poor flight characteristics.
SM-4 Junior
1929 retractable undercarriage development based on SM-1, one built as NX9696 Sally Sovereign and later rebuilt with fixed gear as K of New Haven.
SM-5
1929 SM-3 development with Wright J-5 and later a Wright J-6 engine, one built as NX9625.
SM-6A & SM-6B (ATC 217, 2-89)
Larger capacity 1929 six-seat variant with a longer 52 ft 8 in (16.05 m) wingspan, and a 450 hp (340 kW) Pratt & Whitney Wasp C1 radial engine and a new fuselage, two were built followed by eight more with eight-seat interiors. Examples built in Peru as the Stinson-Faucett F-19. Also known as the Wasp Stinson
SM-7A Junior (ATC 329)
1930 development of SM-2 with a 41 ft 8 in (12.70 m) wingspan and a 300 hp (220 kW) Wright J-6. Eight built, including 7AS sub-variants.
SM-7AS Junior (ATC 2–313)
SM-7A fitted with Edo floats.
SM-7B (ATC 298, 2–313)
SM-7 with a 300 hp (220 kW) Pratt & Whitney R-985 Wasp Junior radial engine, Eight built.
SM-8A (ATC 295, 2–301, 2–461)
Five-seat 41 ft 8 in (12.70 m) wingspan model for 1930, originally powered by a 300 hp (220 kW) Lycoming R-680 radial engine. Around 300 built.
SM-8B/SM-8B Special (ATC 294)
SM-8A with lower-powered 225 hp (168 kW) Wright J-6. Five built, three of which were converted to SM-8B Special.
SM-8D (ATC 312)
SM-8 with a 225 hp (168 kW) Packard DR-980 Diesel radial engine. Two built as NC200W and NC227W in 1930.

== Operators ==
Republic of China

- China National Aviation Corporation
- China Airways Federal
- Shanghai-Chengtu Airways (1920s–30s)

Peru

- Faucett
- Peruvian Air Force operated four from 1929 to 1943.

United States

- Braniff Air Lines
- North American Airways
- Northwest Airways

Honduras

- Honduran Air Force operated three from 1931, including an SM-1F and an SM-8A.

== Specifications (SM-1F) ==
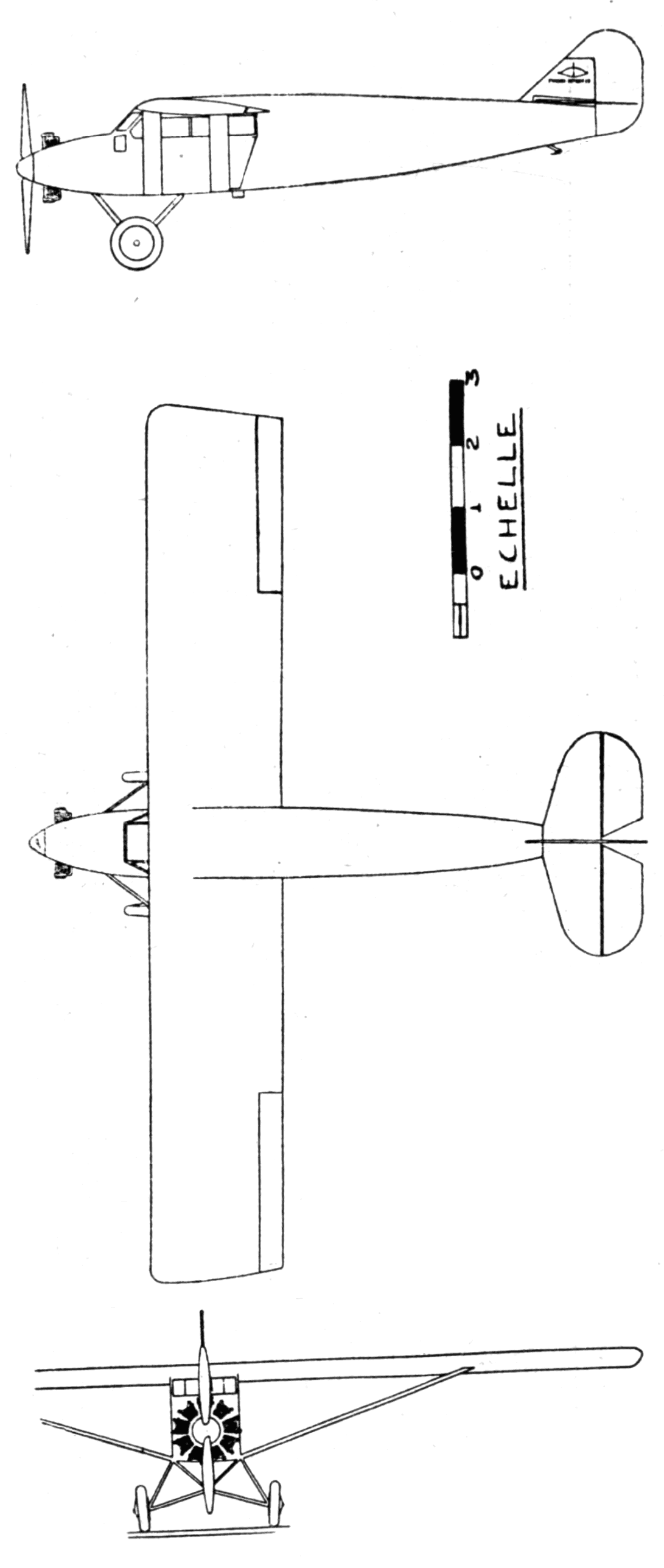
Stinson SM-1 3-view drawing from L'Aérophile September,1927

Data from U.S. Civil Aircraft Vol. 2

General characteristics

- Crew: 1 pilot
- Capacity: 5 passengers
- Length: 32 ft 8 in (9.96 m)
- Wingspan: 46 ft 8 in (14.22 m)
- Height: 9 ft 0 in (2.74 m)
- Wing area: 292 sq ft (27.1 m^{2})
- Airfoil: Modified M-6
- Empty weight: 2,614 lb (1,186 kg)
- Gross weight: 4,300 lb (1,950 kg)
- Fuel capacity: 100 US gal (83 imp gal; 380 L)
- Powerplant: 1 × Wright J-6-9 nine-cylinder air-cooled radial engine, 300 hp (220 kW)

Performance

- Maximum speed: 132 mph (212 km/h, 115 kn)
- Cruise speed: 113 mph (182 km/h, 98 kn)
- Range: 680 mi (1,090 km, 590 nmi)
- Service ceiling: 16,000 ft (4,900 m)
- Rate of climb: 850 ft/min (4.3 m/s)

== See also ==
Related development

- Faucett F-19

Aircraft of comparable role, configuration, and era
SB-1:

- Paramount Cabinaire

SM series:

- Bellanca CH-300 Pacemaker
- Bellanca CH-400 Skyrocket
- Curtiss Thrush
- Fairchild 71
- Farman F.190
- Kalinin K-4
- Moskalyev SAM-5
- Potez 32
- Solar MS-1
- Travel Air 6000
