= F19 =

F19 or F-19 may refer to:

- F-19, a designation for a hypothetical United States fighter aircraft
- F-19 Stealth Fighter, a video game
- Faucett F-19, a 1940s Peruvian eight-seat transport monoplane
- Focke-Wulf F 19, a German aircraft
- Fluorine-19 (F-19 or ^{19}F), an isotope of fluorine
- Italian submarine F19, an Italian Regia Marina (Royal Navy) submarine in commission from 1918 to 1930
