= McCulloch O-100 =

1950 4-cylinder piston engine

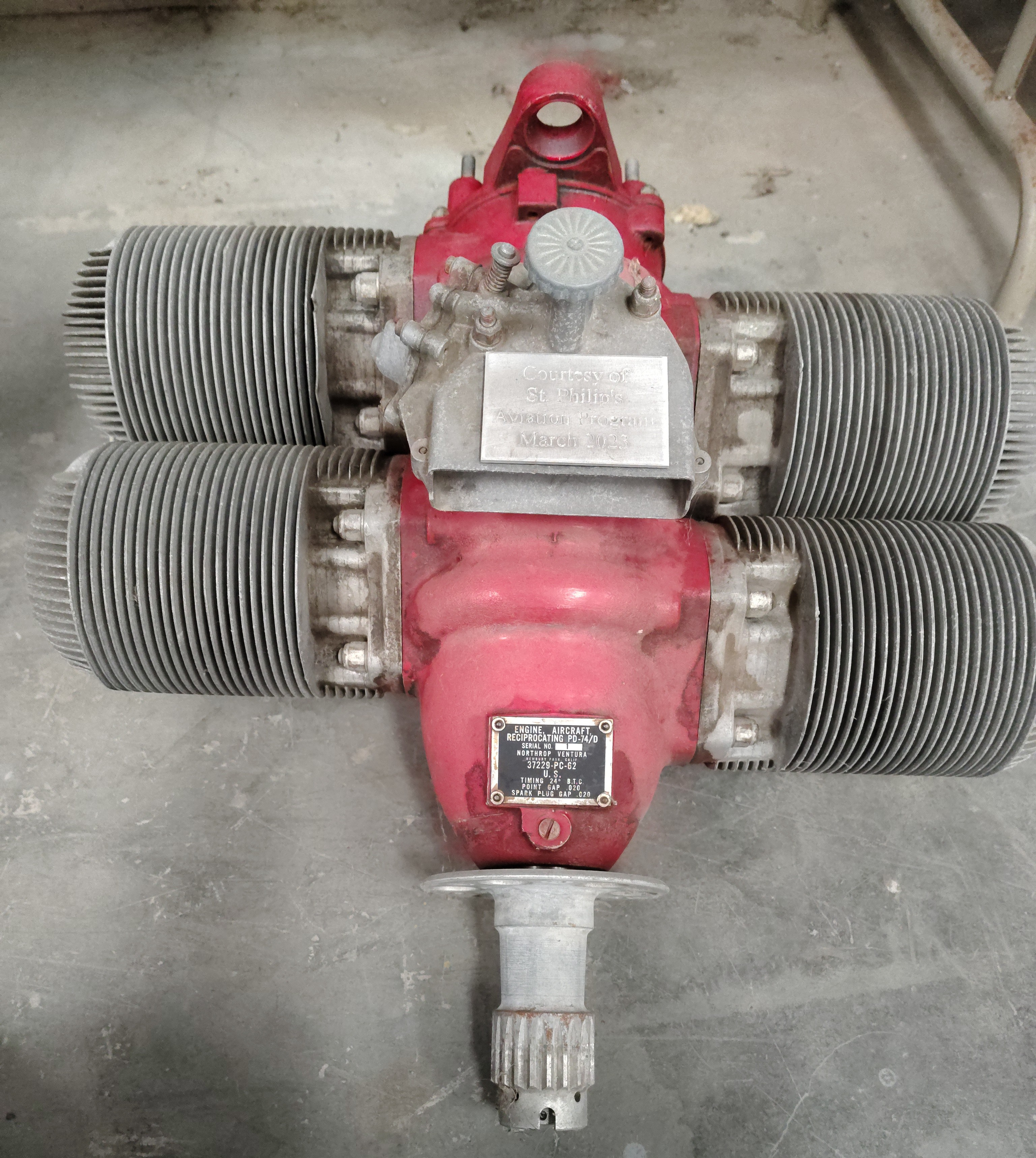
- McCulloch O-100-1 on display at Texas Air Museum - Stinson Chapter
- Type: Piston engine horizontally opposed
- National origin: United States
- Manufacturer: McCulloch Aircraft Corporation McCulloch Motors Corporation
- First run: 1949
- Major applications: Benson B-8M autogyros; Radioplane Model PR-15 (OQ-6) and MQM 33 (Q-19); Model O-15-3 Righter Mfr. Co.
- Developed from: McCulloch 4 cylinder Model 4300C (O-90-1) 1945–1952
- Developed into: McCulloch 6 cylinder Model 6318 (O-150-2) 1955–1972

The McCulloch O-100 is a four-cylinder, air-cooled four-piston drone engine developed by the McCulloch Aircraft Corporation (later to become the McCulloch Motors Corp.) which was founded 1943 in Milwaukee and later moved to Los Angeles. The aircraft corporation was formed from the McCulloch Engineering Company.

In 1972, the corporation was renamed McCulloch Motors Corp. of Los Angeles and sold to Northrop-Ventura.

== Development ==
The McCulloch line of engines consisted of small 1, 2, 4 and 6 cylinder 2-stroke engines. The first engines were used for industrial motor pumps and chainsaws. In the 1940s, military contract started with a 4-cylinder model 4300 (Military O-88) engine to be used in aeronautical target drones. Later with bigger Horsepower (H.P.) development, the engines had experimental aircraft applications.

== Variants ==
Horizontally-Opposed Piston Engines

=== 4-Cylinder ===
- Model 4300 (Mil O-88)
- Model 4300C
- Model 4318A (Mil O-100-1)
- Model 4318B (mil O-100-2)

=== 6-Cylinder ===
- Model 6318 (O-150-2)
- Model TC-6150 (O-150-4)

== Display ==
=== Australia ===
- Moorabbin Air Museum - Moorabbin Airport, Melbourne Australia

=== United States ===
- Wings of History Air Museum - San Martin, California
- Texas Air Museum - Stinson Chapter - San Antonio, Texas
- Combat Air Museum - Topeka Regional Airport at Forbes Field, Topeka, Kansas

== Specifications (McCulloch O-100-1) ==
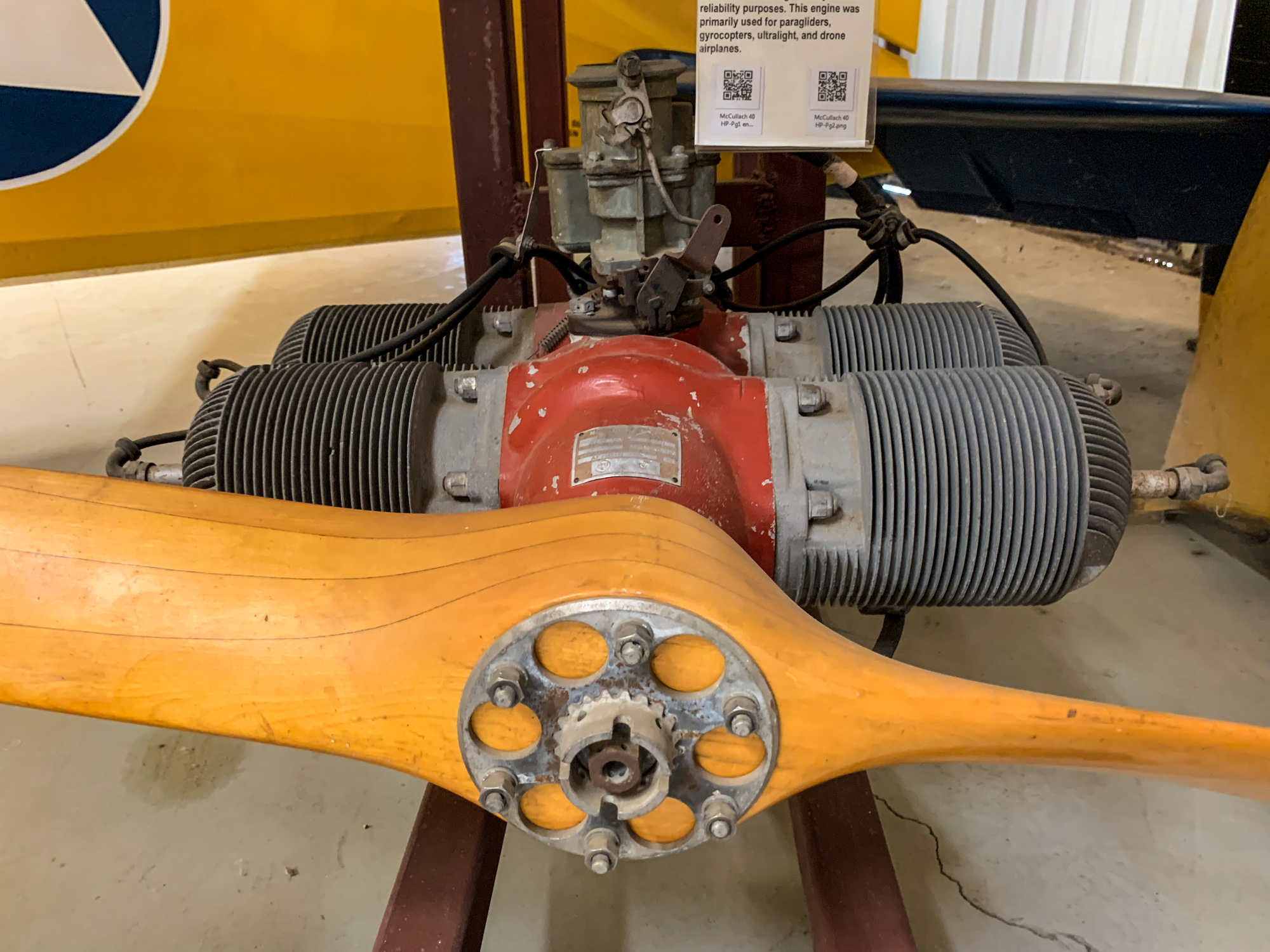
McCulloch O-100-1 (model 4318A) on display at the Wings of History Air Museum

Data from McCulloch 4318 Engine Manual

=== General characteristics ===
- Type: opposed (flat) 4-cylinder piston engine
- Bore: 3 3/16 in (81.0 mm)
- Stroke: 3 1/8 in (79.4 mm)
- Displacement: 100 in^{3} (1.6 L)
- Length: 26 in (660 mm)
- Diameter: 27 in (690 mm)
- Dry weight: 83 lb (38 kg)

=== Components ===
- Fuel system: downdraft carburetor
- Fuel type: 115/145 RON
- Oil system: Dry sump
- Cooling system: Air-cooled

=== Performance ===
- Power output: 72 hp (54 kW) at 4,100 rpm (takeoff)
- Specific power: 0.66 hp/in^{3}
- Compression ratio: 8:1
- Power-to-weight ratio: 0.82 hp/lb

== See also ==
- List of aircraft engines
