= Marjorie Stinson =

American aviator, pilot instructor, and stunt pilot (1895-1975)

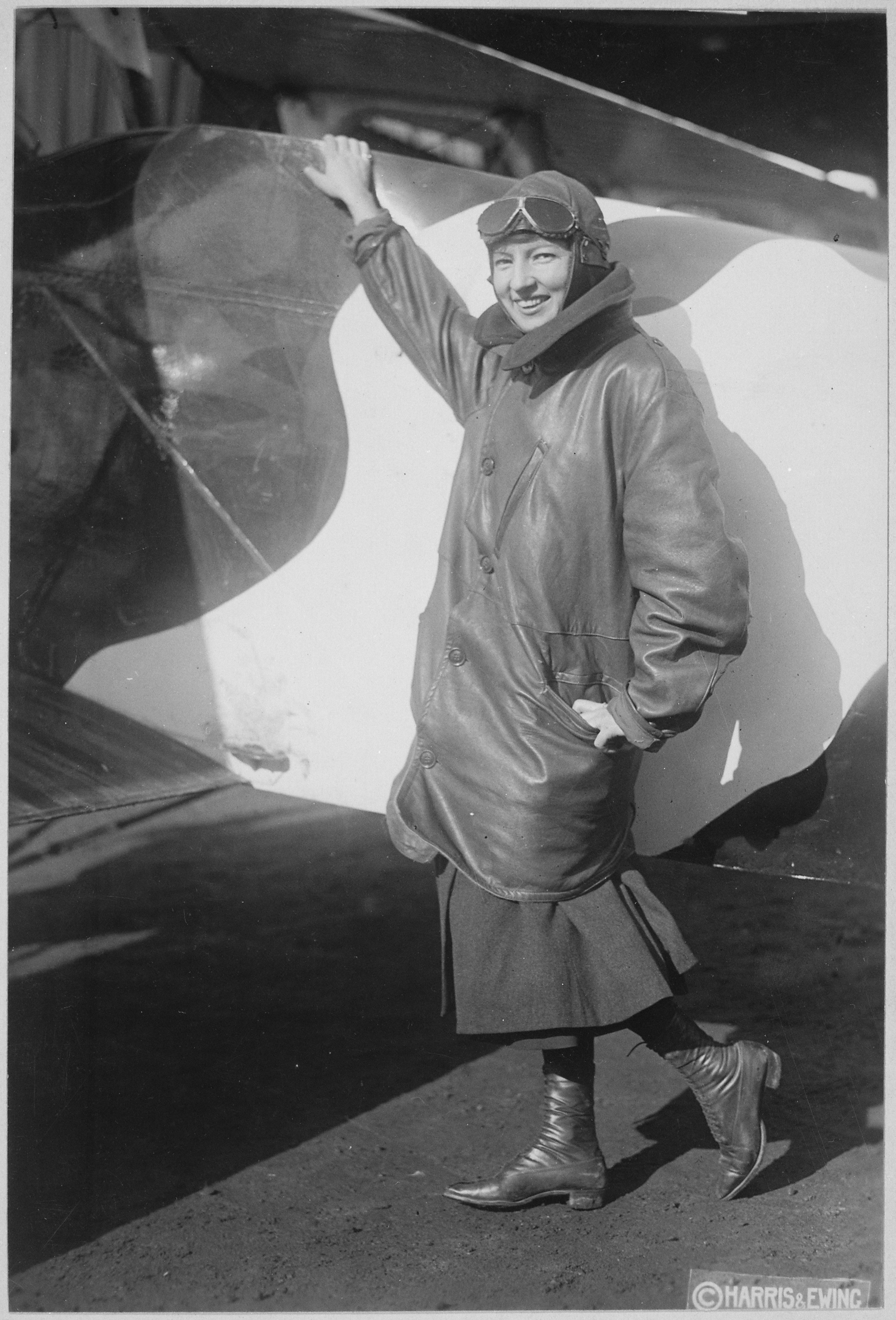
Marjorie Stinson, "only woman to whom a pilot's license has been granted by Army & Navy Committee of Aeronautics", in WWI

Marjorie Claire Stinson (July 5, 1895 – April 15, 1975) was an American aviator, airmail pilot, pilot instructor, and stunt pilot — one of the pioneering Stinson siblings of early aviation, who included older sister Katherine, and younger brothers Eddie and Jack.

She trained at the Wright Flying School, and earned her Fédération Aéronautique Internationale license in 1914, becoming the ninth woman in the U.S. to do so. Stinson became an exhibition pilot, and later was the first female airmail pilot in the United States, flying from Seguin to San Antonio, Texas in 1915. Along with her sister Katherine, she taught at the Stinson School of Flying established by her mother. After it closed, Marjorie returned to exhibition flying and worked at the Department of the Navy, retiring in 1945. She died at Rogers Memorial Hospital in Washington, D.C., in 1975. Stinson was a charter member of the Ninety-Nines.

== Career ==
=== Early career ===
Following in the footsteps of her sister, Katherine, Marjorie Stinson learned to fly in June 1914 at the Wright School in Dayton. With instruction from Howard Rinehart, she was able to solo after 4.5 hours. She was the ninth woman in the U.S. to receive an FAI certificate. After being unsuccessful in starting an airmail route in Texas, she joined the family flight school at the Stinson Municipal Airport, where she was an instructor like her sister. In 1915 she was the only woman admitted into the US Aviation Reserve Corps. In 1916 the Royal Canadian Flying Corps began sending their cadets to the Stinson School for their training, where she was referred to as "The Flying Schoolmarm" and her students as "The Texas Escadrille" By war's end, hundreds of military pilots had trained at the family's school.

=== Stunt pilot ===
From 1917 to 1928 Marjorie was a very successful stunt show pilot performing at events like:

- July 3, 1915, Marjorie made two flights in Bogalusa, Louisiana, one at 10:30 and one at 4:30
- August 29, 1914, Marjorie and her sister Katherine carried the yellow "votes for Women" banner in their Wright Biplane at the suffrage field day in Chicago, they abandoned their exhibition tour to take part in the suffragette field and thus raise $50,000 for six suffragette "campaign states"
- June 23, 1919, a Campaign for $10,000,000 for a Victory Memorial Building in Washington, Marjorie flew across Washington to help advertise their campaign
- April 21, Marjorie flew a small Curtis Plane between Bolling Field and Potomac park in Washington and upon landing sold $3000 worth of bonds for Victory Liberty Loans

== Legacy ==
=== Death ===
When Marjorie died in 1975 on April 15 she was cremated and her ashes spread across the Stinson Airfield.

=== Stinson Airfield ===
After being established 1915 by the Stinson Family, the Stinson Municipal Airport is the second oldest general aviation airport. It holds the home of the Texas Air Museum - Stinson Chapter and was used as a training base for the United States Army Air Forces during World War 2.
