= Stinson SB-1 Detroiter =

Detroiter
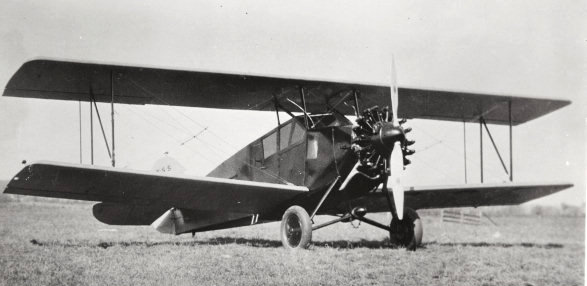
- Stinson SB-1

General information
- Type: Airliner
- National origin: United States
- Manufacturer: Stinson Aircraft Syndicate; Stinson Aircraft Company
- Number built: 27

History
- First flight: 25 January 1926
- Developed into: Stinson SM-1 Detroiter

The Stinson Detroiter was a single-engined cabin biplane built by the Stinson Aircraft Syndicate in the 1920s, which was used as an airliner and executive aircraft. A four-seat prototype flew in January 1926, and was followed by 26 production aircraft designated Stinson SB-1, which were built between August 1926 and June 1927. It formed the basis of the Stinson SM-1 Detroiter, a monoplane derivative that succeeded it in production and was built in larger numbers.

== Development ==
In 1925, the American aviator Eddie Stinson developed a preliminary design for a single-engined cabin biplane, and formed the Stinson Airplane Syndicate with a number of Detroit businessmen, including William E. Metzger, to develop his design. The prototype of Stinson's design, the Detroiter, was built in a rented Loft in Detroit, and made its first flight, with Stinson at the controls, at Selfridge Field, Michigan, on January 25, 1926.

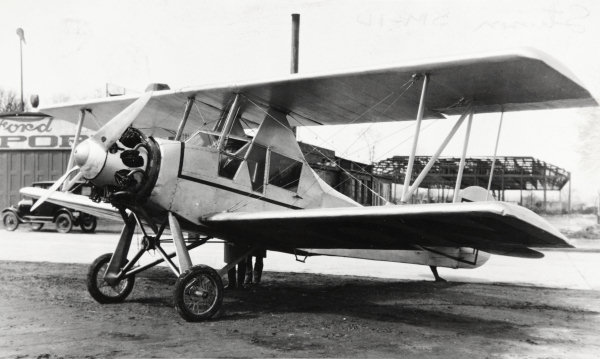
The prototype Detroiter

The Detroiter was a single-bay biplane of mixed wood and metal construction. The fuselage had a welded steel-tube structure, covered in fabric, and was of rectangular section, while the wings had spruce spars and duralumin ribs. The enclosed cabin had seats for a pilot and three passengers. It was powered by a 200 hp (150 kW) Wright J-4 Whirlwind radial engine driving a two-bladed metal propeller. Unusual features for the time included cabin heating (heated by the engine exhaust), an electric engine starter to avoid the need for hand starts and individual wheel brakes, with a parking brake also being fitted. Snow chains could be fitted to the mainwheels.

Stinson extensively demonstrated the Detroiter in the early months of 1926, and in May that year Stinson founded the Stinson Aircraft Company, acquiring a building in Northville, a suburb of Detroit, as a factory. Production began in August that year of the SB-1 Detroiter, which differed from the prototype in having a deeper fuselage which accommodated five people, revised wing bracing and a new tail. It retained the J-4 engine. Twenty-six SB-1s were built from August 1926 to June 1927, with some later aircraft using the 220 hp (160 kW) Wright J-5 Whirlwind. The SB-1 was replaced in production by the Stinson SM-1 Detroiter, a monoplane derivative of the SB-1 with a stretched fuselage based on that of the SB-1 and a new, high-mounted wing, with more than 100 built.

== Operational service ==
The SB-1 Detroiter was used by several airlines in the United States and Canada, including Northwest Airways, which used three Detroiters on airmail services between Minneapolis-St Paul and Chicago from November 1926 and on passenger services from July 1927, Florida Airways, and Wien Alaska Airlines. Two SB-1s were used by Hubert Wilkins on his 1927 Arctic expedition, with one (flown by Wilkins and Carl Ben Eielson) being abandoned after crashlanding on ice fields 125 mi (201 km) north-east of Point Barrow, Alaska.

The SB-1 was also used as an executive aircraft. Examples were sold to Horace Dodge Jr. and to John Duval Dodge, the respective sons of Horace Elgin Dodge and John Francis Dodge, the founders of Dodge Brothers Company, and to the racing driver and playboy Cliff Durant.

== Variants ==
Stinson Detroiter
Prototype four-seat cabin biplane powered by 200 hp (150 kW) Wright J-4 Whirlwind engine. One built.
SB-1 Detroiter
Production five seat derivative, powered by 200 hp (150 kW) Wright J-4 or 220 hp (160 kW) Wright J-5. 26 built.

== Operators ==
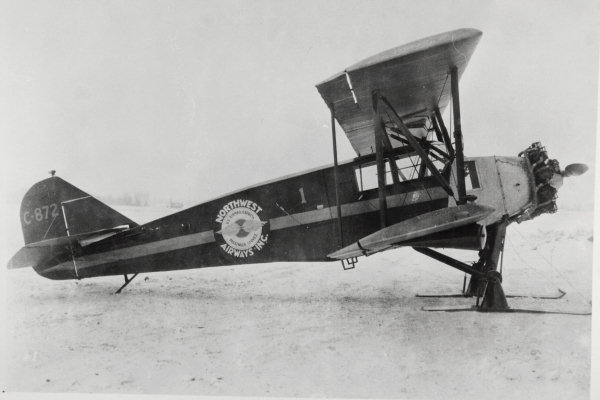
Northwest Airways SB-1

Canada

- Patricia Airways and Exploration Limited

United States

- Florida Airways
- Northwest Airways
- Wayco Air Services
- Wien Alaska Airlines

== Specifications (SB-1 (Wright J-4)) ==
Data from U.S. Civil Aircraft Vol. 1

General characteristics

- Crew: 1 pilot
- Capacity: 4 passengers
- Length: 28 ft 10 in (8.79 m)
- Wingspan: 35 ft 10 in (10.92 m)
- Height: 10 ft 3 in (3.12 m)
- Wing area: 350 sq ft (33 m^{2})
- Airfoil: USA 35B
- Empty weight: 1,700 lb (771 kg)
- Gross weight: 2,900 lb (1,315 kg)
- Fuel capacity: 70 US gal (58 imp gal; 260 L)
- Powerplant: 1 × Wright J-4 nine-cylinder air-cooled radial engine, 200 hp (150 kW)

Performance

- Maximum speed: 118 mph (190 km/h, 103 kn)
- Cruise speed: 100 mph (160 km/h, 87 kn)
- Stall speed: 45 mph (72 km/h, 39 kn) (landing speed)
- Range: 600 mi (970 km, 520 nmi)
- Service ceiling: 13,500 ft (4,100 m)
- Rate of climb: 800 ft/min (4.1 m/s)

== See also ==
Aircraft of comparable role, configuration, and era

- Paramount Cabinaire
