= Stinson Municipal Airport =

Airport in Texas, United States

Stinson Municipal Airport Stinson Field
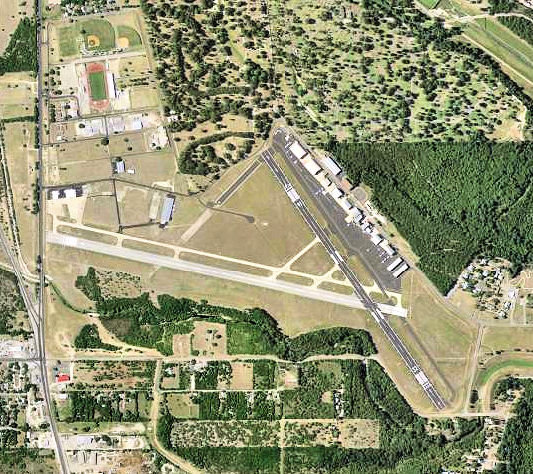
- USGS 2006 orthophoto
- IATA: SSF; ICAO: KSSF; FAA LID: SSF

Summary
- Airport type: Public
- Owner: City of San Antonio
- Serves: San Antonio, Texas, USA
- Elevation AMSL: 577 ft / 176 m
- Coordinates: 29°20′13″N 098°28′16″W
- Website: SSF

Map
- Location of airport in Texas SSF (the United States)

Runways
Direction	Length		Surface
Direction	ft	m	Surface
9/27	5,000	1,524	Asphalt
14/32	4,128	1,258	Asphalt
~~4/22~~	~~3,528~~	~~1,075~~	~~Asphalt~~
~~6/35~~	~~3,648~~	~~1,112~~	~~Grass~~

Statistics (2022)
- Aircraft operations: 81,865
- Based aircraft: 90
- Source: Federal Aviation Administration

Stinson Municipal Airport (IATA: SSF, ICAO: KSSF, FAA LID: SSF) is seven miles south of downtown San Antonio in Bexar County, Texas. The National Plan of Integrated Airport Systems for 2011–2015 categorized it as a reliever airport.

== History ==
Stinson Municipal Airport is the second oldest general aviation airport in continuous operation in the United States (after College Park Airport).

Established in October 1915, when the Stinson family initially leased the land from the City of San Antonio. The Stinsons had been operating out of Fort Sam Houston but had to relocate when the 1st Aero Squadron took over the fort's air facilities to monitor the border. Emma Stinson leased 750 acres southeast of town, and Edward Stinson cleared the mesquite. The Stinson School of Flying was managed by Emma Stinson, and financed by Katherine Stinson. Eddie worked as one of the mechanics, while Marjorie Stinson was the flight instructor. The first class of five Canadians graduated in November 1915. By March 1916, the school had 24 students and four aircraft.

Civilian flights were banned during WWI, and the airport became San Antonio's civil airport in 1918. The name was changed to Windburn Field in 1927, but then changed back to Stinson Field in 1936. The Works Progress Administration built the terminal building between 1935 and 1936. During World War II the airfield was used by the United States Army Air Forces as a training base. At the end of the war the airfield was returned over to the City of San Antonio for civil use.

As the reliever for San Antonio International, the airport has an FBO, three flight schools, police and state aviation units, a part 135 operator, two aerial photography outfits, helicopter tour company and helicopter flight school, and numerous general aviation aircraft. It is also home to the Texas Air Museum - Stinson Chapter. The historic terminal was renovated in 2006-2008 and runway 9-27 re-opened on March 11, 2010 after being re-surfaced and extended to 5002 feet, allowing more private and business jet traffic.

In August 2010 the Texas Wing of the Civil Air Patrol announced it will be moving its statewide headquarters to Stinson Municipal Airport. It was only in Stinson for several years before moving to its current location.

In March 2017, funded by the City of San Antonio and Texas Department of Transportation, construction of a new control tower for the airport began as an attempt to make the airport more attractive to corporate travelers and to bring attention to the historic sites surrounding the airport. Construction of the new tower was completed and began its operation in 2019.

== Facilities ==
The airport covers 360 acres (146 ha) at an elevation of 577 feet (176 m). It has two asphalt runways: 9/27 is 5,000 by 100 feet (1,524 x 30 m) and 14/32 is 4,128 by 100 feet (1,258 x 30 m).

In the year ending December 31, 2022 the airport had 81,865 aircraft operations, average 224 per day: 92% general aviation, 6% military, and 2% air taxi. 90 aircraft were then based at the airport: 73 single-engine, 11 multi-engine, and 6 helicopter.

== See also ==
- Texas World War II Army Airfields
- List of airports in Texas
- Tex Hill
