= FMA AeT.1 =

1930s Argentinian airliner

AeT.1
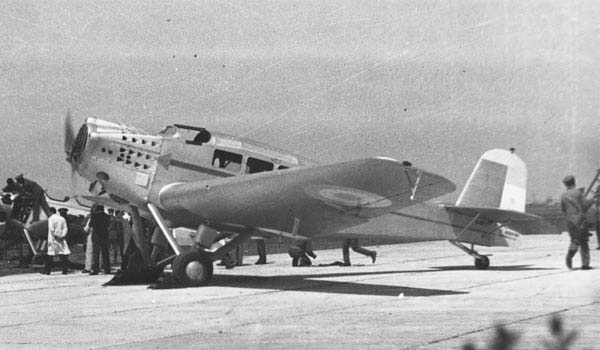

General information
- Type: Airliner
- Manufacturer: FMA
- Primary user: Aero-Argentina
- Number built: 3

History
- First flight: 15 April 1933

The FMA AeT.1 was an airliner built in Argentina in the early 1930s.

== Design and development ==
The AeT.1 was a low-wing cantilever monoplane of conventional design, with fixed tailwheel undercarriage. Only three examples were built, christened General San Martín, Deán Funes, and Jorge Newbery. These aircraft provided Argentina's first scheduled airline services with Aero-Argentina, flying between Córdoba and Buenos Aires.

The Deán Funes was also used to make a long-distance flight to Ushuaia, bringing the first mail to that town after a flight of 6,500 km (4,000 mi). Air France director Colin Jeannel flew as a passenger on that flight.

== Specifications ==
General characteristics

- Crew: Three - two pilots and radio operator
- Capacity: 5 passengers
- Length: 9.70 m (31 ft 10 in)
- Wingspan: 17.30 m (56 ft 9 in)
- Height: 4.36 m (14 ft 4 in)
- Wing area: 37.0 m^{2} (398 sq ft)
- Empty weight: 1,750 kg (3,860 lb)
- Gross weight: 2,810 kg (6,190 lb)
- Powerplant: 1 × Lorraine-Dietrich 12Eb , 340 kW (450 hp)

Performance

- Maximum speed: 225 km/h (139 mph, 121 kn)
- Range: 1,170 km (730 mi, 630 nmi)
- Service ceiling: 6,000 m (19,700 ft)

== See also ==
Aircraft of comparable role, configuration, and era

- Faucett F-19
