= Clarktor 6 =

Airfield tractor

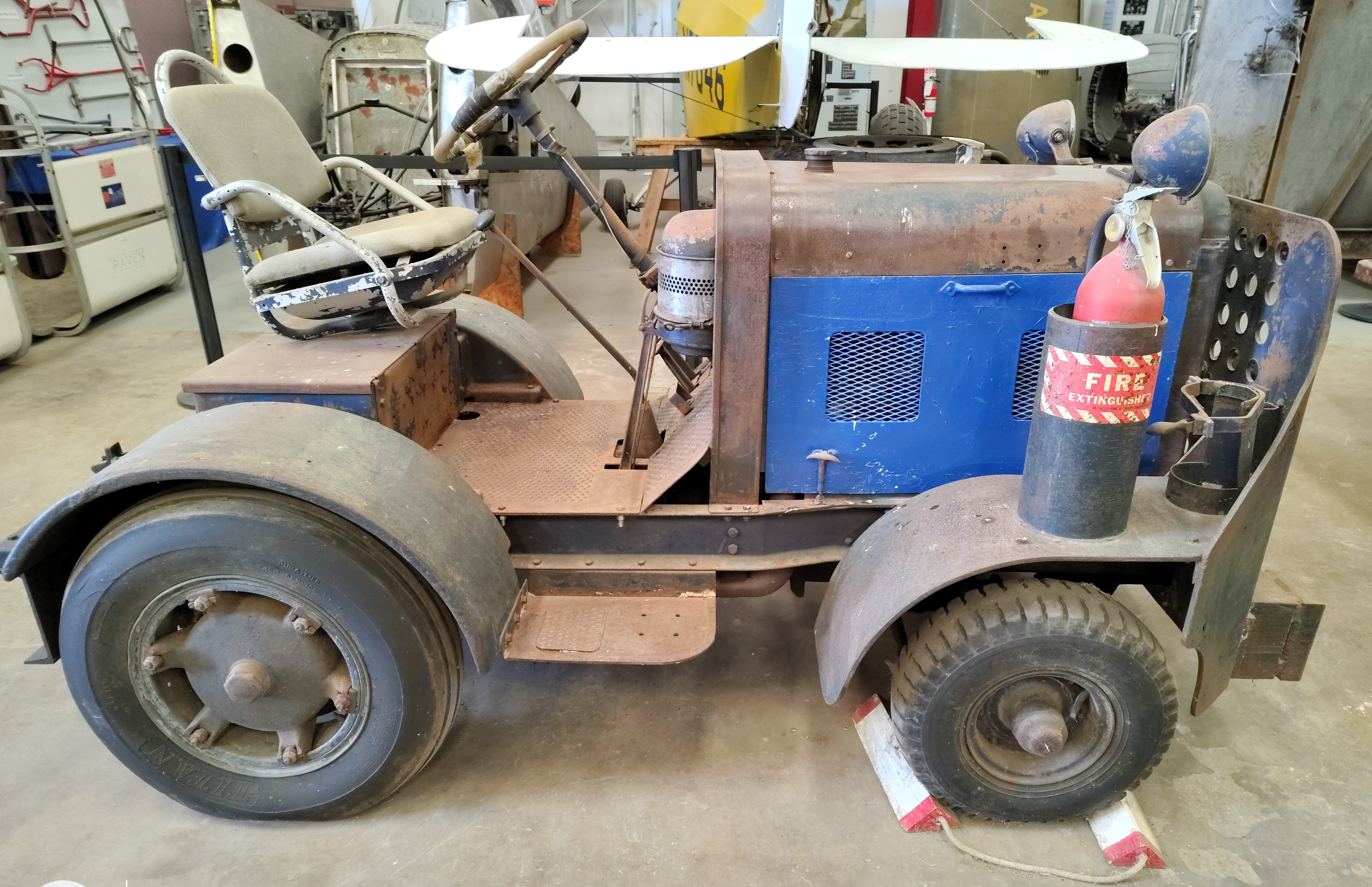
- Clarktor 6 Towing Tractor awaiting restoration

Overview
- Manufacturer: Clark Equipment Company (1916–present)
- Production: 1926–1960

Body and chassis
- Class: Compact utility vehicle
- Body style: doorless TUG
- Layout: Front engine, rear-wheel drive

The Clarktor 6 was an aircraft tug designed and produced by the Clark Tructractor Plant (founded 1919) in Battle Creek, Michigan; The plant is a division of the Clark Equipment Company founded in 1916.

== Development ==
The first Clarktor was manufactured in 1926 and could tow a load over one ton on trolleys. This debut vehicle led to more powerful equipment.

The Clarktor 6 was developed in 1942 as an aircraft tug. Its power came from a six-cylinder flathead engine.

== Production ==
By the end of World War II, thousands of different cargo handling vehicles were deployed to different theater of operations. The British Royal Air Force received 1,500 Clarktor 6. These versions were 'British Heavy' (BH) and supplied to Ministry of War Transport under the Lend Lease Act.

== Operational history ==
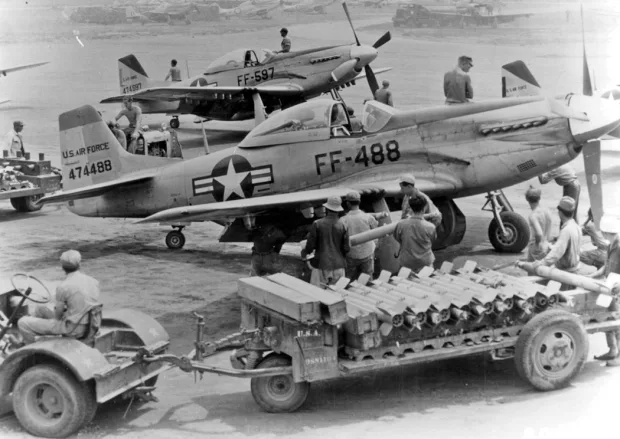
Clarktor 6 towing an HVAR-loaded trailer, re-arming F-51 Mustangs during the Korean War around August 1951

World War II - This small tug weighed 2 tons with a drawbar capacity of over 2 tons and towing capacity of 90 tons. It serviced with the United States Army and the British Royal Air Forces. It had no problem towing British's Lancaster and Halifax bombers. The American B24 and B17 were in the 16 ton empty weight and 29 to 32 tons fully loaded and was within the vehicle's capacity.

Korean War - The Clarktor 6 continued operations by providing support not only in moving Air Force jets for service and maintenance, but also to move bombs, fuel, supplies, rations to different areas on an airfield. Soon the Army Bases and Navy yards used the tug for similar operations.

== Variants ==
- Light Duty - T105 or T125 Chrysler Engine.
- Heavy Duty - T112 or T116 Chrysler Engine. Rated as Mill 44 and Mill 50

== Display ==
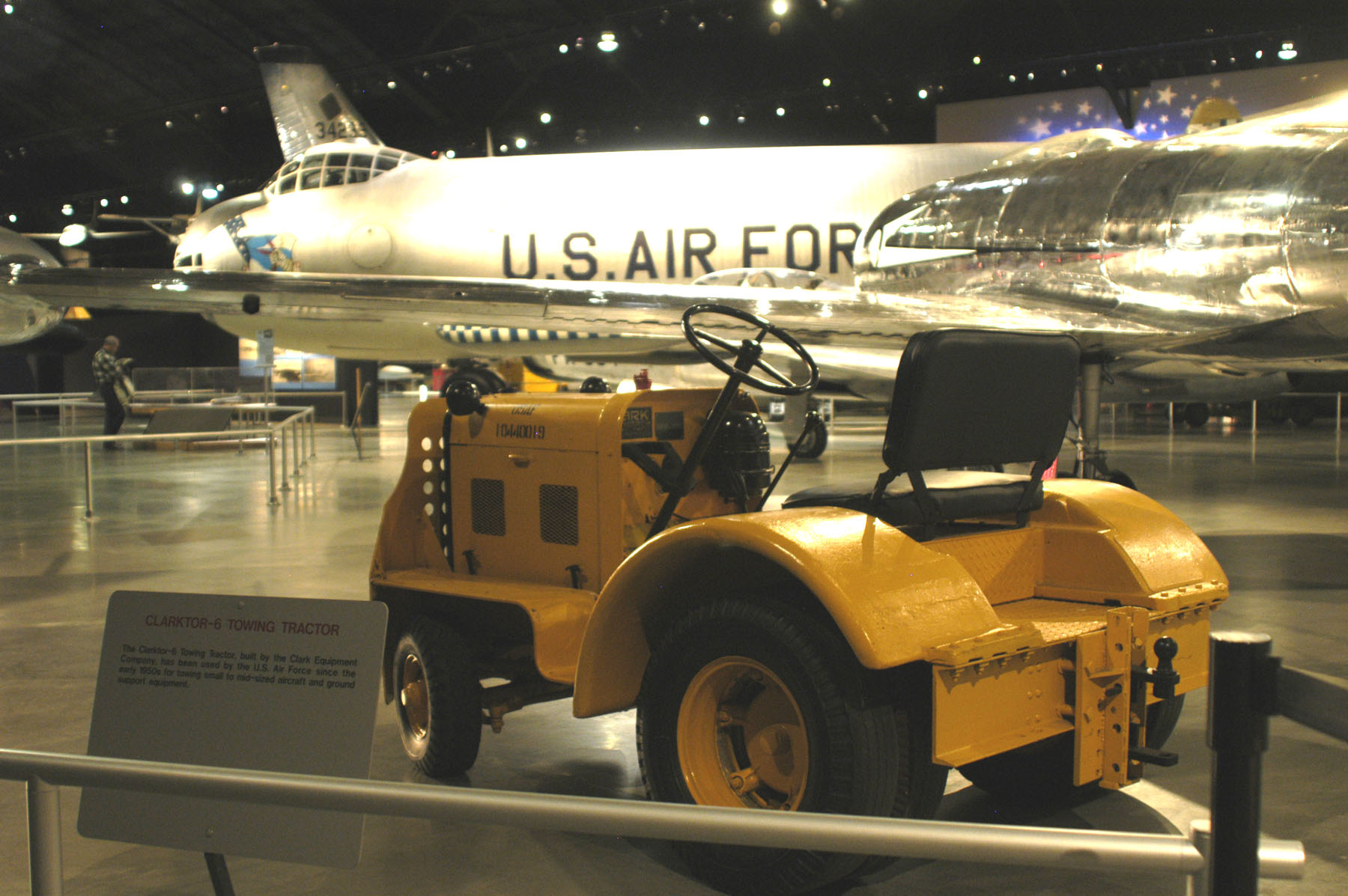
A Clarkton 6 on-display at the National Museum of the United States Air Force

=== Australia ===
- The Australian War Memorial - Treloar Crescent, Campbell ACT 2612, Australia

=== United States ===
- National Museum of the United States Air Force - Dayton, Ohio
- USS Alabama Battleship Memorial Park - Mobile, Alabama
- Museum of Aviation - Museum in Robins Air Force Base, Georgia
- Texas Air Museum - Stinson Chapter - San Antonio, Texas
- Commemorative Air Force - Dallas, Texas
- Castle Air Force Base - Atwater, California

== Specifications ==
Data from Estrella Warbirds Museum

General characteristics

- Crew: 1
- Capacity: 1 passenger
- Length: 8 ft 4 in (2.54 m)
- Width: 5 ft 5 in (1.65 m)
- Height: 4 ft 8 in (1.42 m)
- Gross weight: 4,700 lb (2,132 kg)
- Fuel capacity: 6 gal
- Powerplant: 1 × Chrysler 6-cyl. water cooled Straight-six engine, 63 hp (47 kW)

Performance

- Maximum speed: 12 mph (19 km/h, 10 kn)
