= Stinson Aircraft Company =

Defunct American aircraft manufacturer

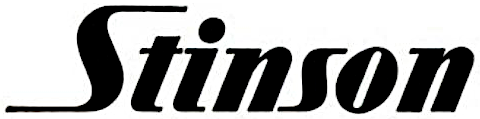
- Industry: Aerospace
- Founded: 1920; 106 years ago
- Founders: Eddie Stinson
- Defunct: 1948
- Fate: Defunct
- Headquarters: Detroit, Michigan, U.S.
- Key people: William A. Mara
- Parent: Cord Corporation (1929–1934); AVCO (1934–1939); Vultee (1939–1943); Convair (1943–1948); Piper (1948)

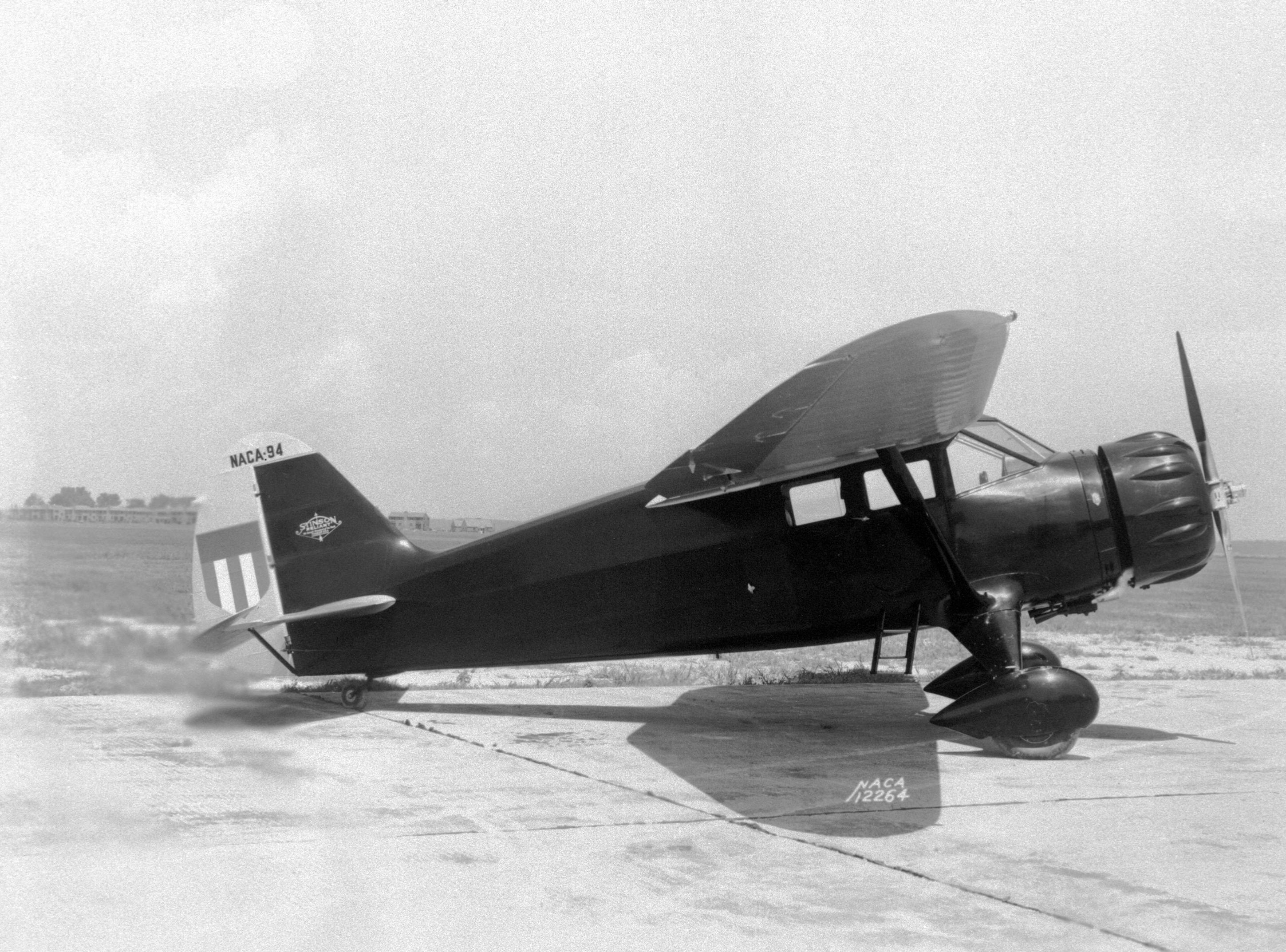
Stinson SR-8E Reliant

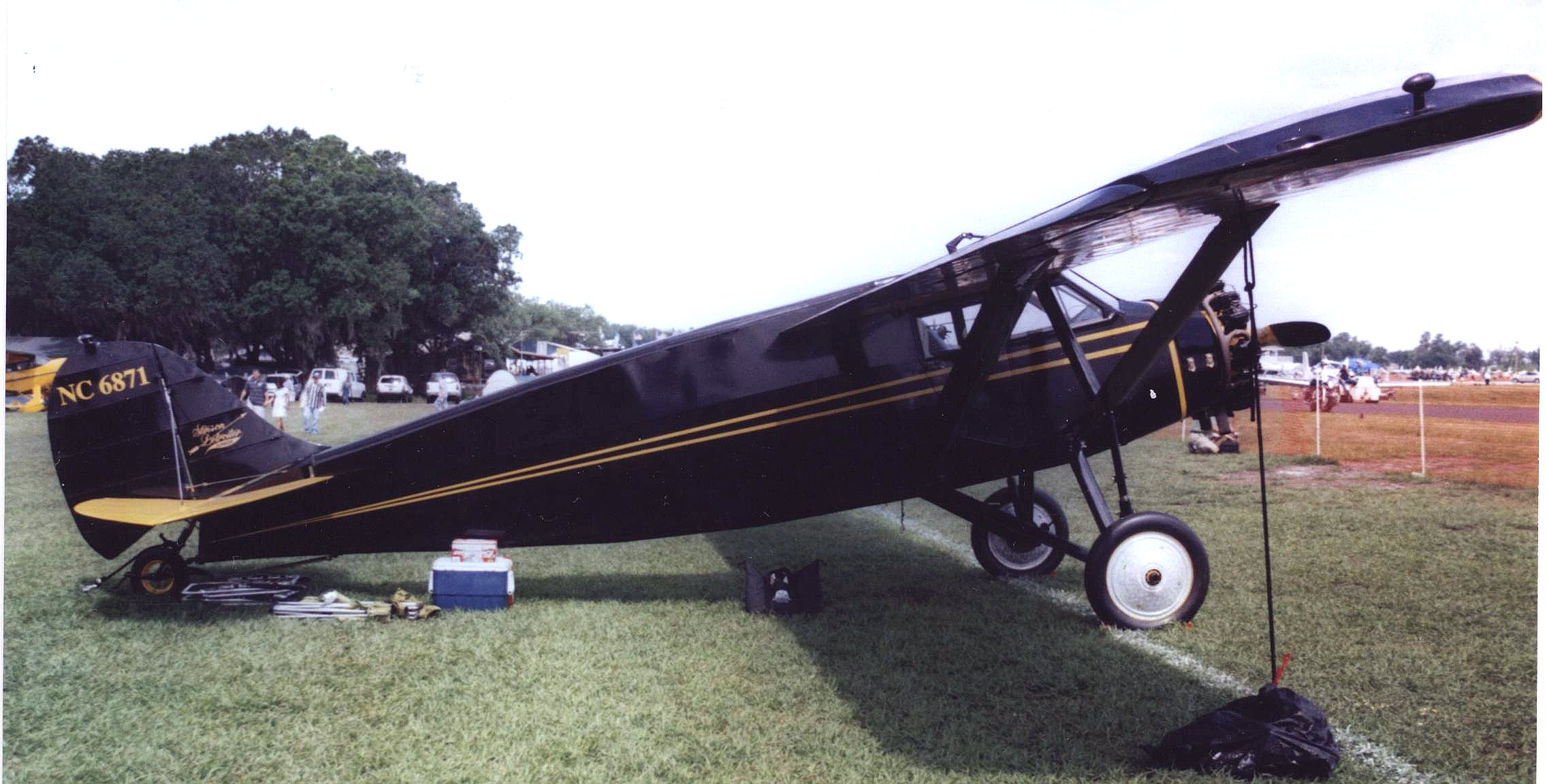
A 1928-built Stinson SM-2 Junior at Lakeland, Florida, in April 2007

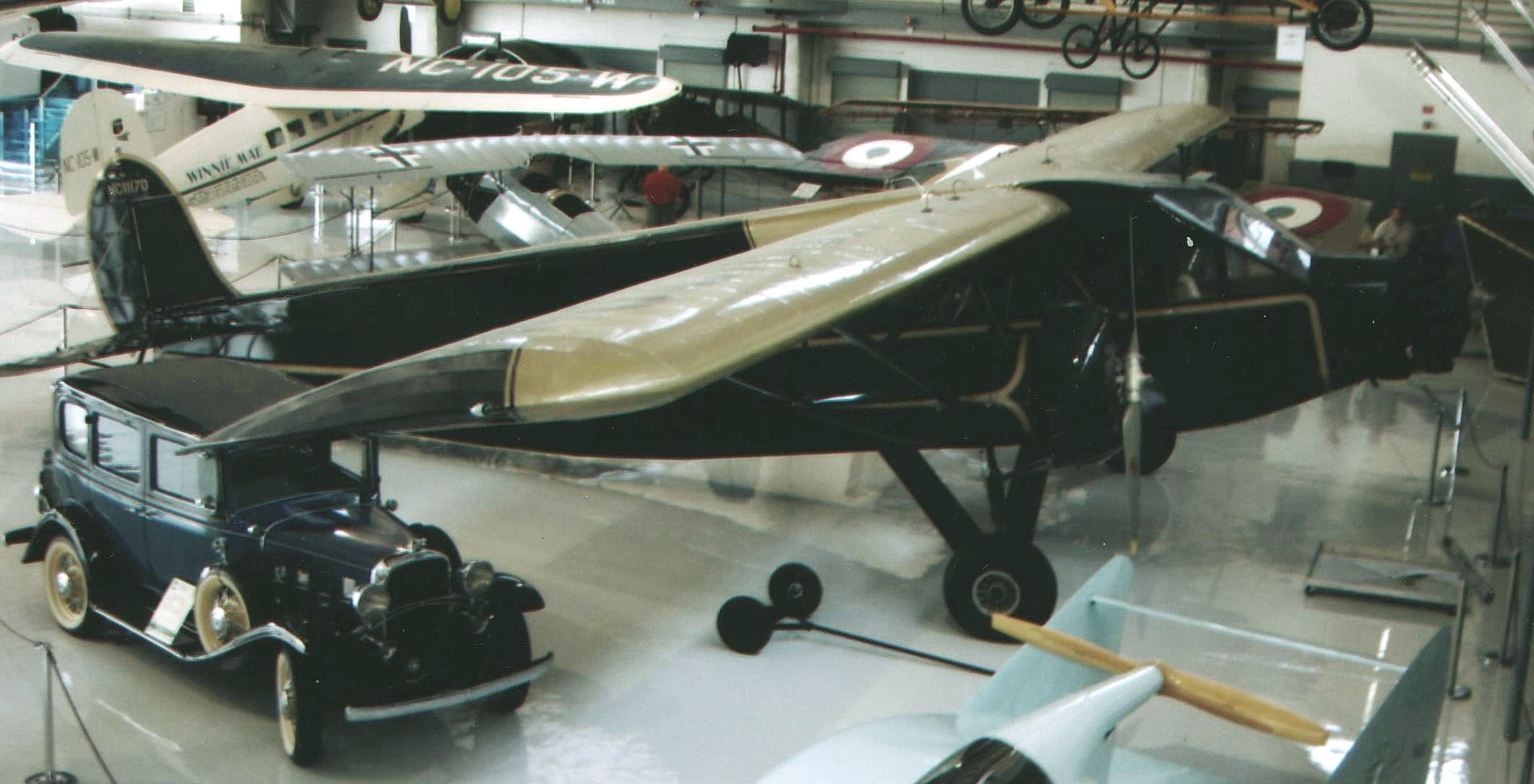
Stinson SM-6000B Airliner trimotor of 1931 airworthy at the Weeks Museum, Polk City, Florida in April 2007

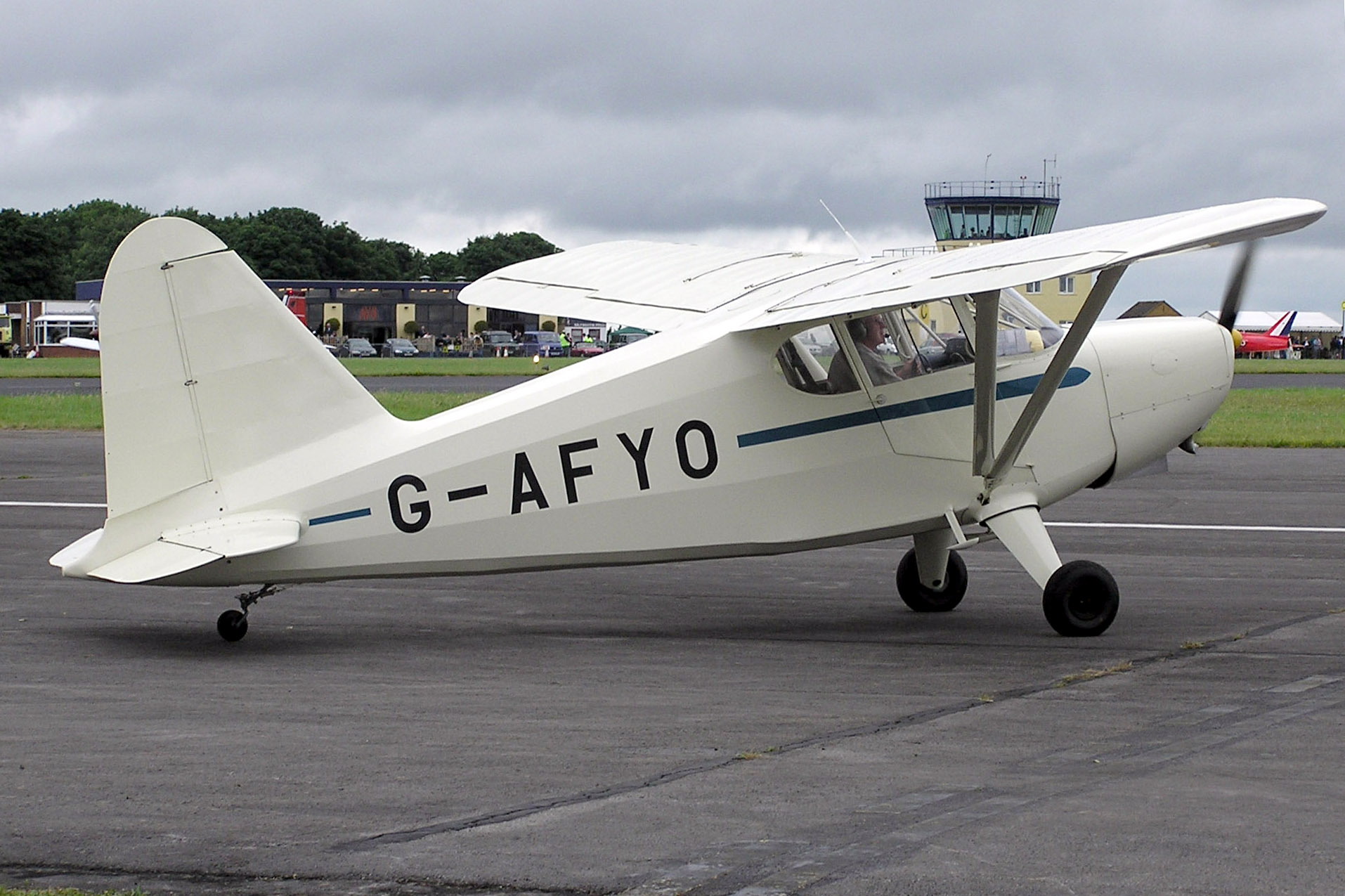
1939 Stinson HW-75 (also called the 105). The production run totalled 535 aircraft (275 in 1939 and 260 in 1940).

The Stinson Aircraft Company was an aircraft manufacturing company in the United States between the 1920s and the 1950s.

== History ==
The Stinson Aircraft Company was founded in Dayton, Ohio, in 1920 by aviator Edward Stinson, the brother of aviator Katherine Stinson. After five years of business ventures, Stinson made Detroit, Michigan the focus of his future flying endeavors while still flying as a stunt pilot, earning $100,000 a year for his efforts — a huge sum in those days.

Stinson found Detroit's business community receptive to his plans to develop his own airplane. Alfred V. Verville and a group of local businessmen — the Detroit Board of Commerce's Aviation Committee — supported Stinson's plans to establish the Stinson Aircraft Syndicate in 1925, and provided $25,000 to design and build a prototype, an enclosed cockpit, 4-place biplane, powered by a Wright Whirlwind J-4 air-cooled radial engine test flighted at Packard Field in Roseville, Michigan, a northeast suburb of Detroit. Packard Field was the first commercial air field in Michigan, opened in 1919, site of Packard Aviation and the Michigan State School of Aviation, making it a natural location for Stinson to launch his business in the Detroit area.

The Stinson Detroiter SB-1 (for "Stinson Biplane model 1") made its maiden flight from Packard Field on January 25, 1926. The plane not only had a rare (for the period) enclosed cabin, it also had heat (which was a big plus given the cold Michigan winter), upholstered seats and side panels, and even an electric cigar lighter. It became an overnight success, and flights were offered in February to 70 riders thus enabling Stinson to raise $150,000 in public stock capital to go into production. Stinson incorporated in Michigan as the Stinson Aircraft Corporation. On May 4, 1926, Eddie acquired the Stimson (no connection to Stinson and no typo error) Scale Mfg. building in Northville, Michigan, just across the pond from the locally famous Ford Valve Plant, and the first production model SB-1 rolled out just three months later in August 1926. Stinson employed over 250 workers at the Northville factory in 1926.)

The aircraft were too large to be completely assembled in the Northville plant, so the wings were attached to the fuselage just west of town at the new, local Northville Airfield, a land project owned by a group of village entrepreneurs established to support the Stinson factory. Aircraft were then flown and delivered from here to buyers. Stinson Aircraft Corp. sold a remarkable 18 SB-1 Detroiters by the end of 1926, completing manufacture of 10 aircraft, while the prototype SB-1 was sold to Horace Dodge, son of one of the Dodge Motor Cars founders.

Northwest (today Delta Air Lines) sold its first passenger ticket in July 1927, on their first of several SB-1s (and later SM-1s). By this time, the Stinson Corp. had erected their own concrete-floored steel hangar at the airfield, where they could complete the aircraft assembly process of attaching the wings. The finished superstructure fuselages were simply pulled through the center of town to the airfield behind Ford Model TT trucks, while the wings were put on trailers.

Toward the end of 1926, Stinson Aircraft Corp. began developing their next generation SM-1 (Stinson Monoplane type 1), a six-place monoplane initially powered by the more powerful Wright J-5. The maiden flight took place in the spring of 1927. Coincidentally, the new monoplane had nearly the same wing dimensions and many similar design elements of the Ryan monoplane flown in Lindbergh's famous transatlantic flight of May 1927. This model eventually replaced the biplane completely, and by 1928 the SB-1 was out of production by the time the FAA finally got around to officially certificating it. The early SM-1s were built and flown out of Northville, but the company outgrew its facilities and left Northville by 1929, moving to Wayne, Michigan, which was next to the site of the Detroit Industrial Airport.

Business was steadily increasing, and Stinson delivered 121 aircraft in 1929.

Automobile mogul Errett Lobban (E.L.) Cord acquired 60 percent of Stinson's stock in September 1929, and his Cord Corporation provided additional investment capital to permit Stinson to sell its aircraft at a competitive price while still pursuing new designs. At the height of the Depression in 1930, Stinson offered six aircraft models, ranging from the four-seat Junior to the Stinson 6000 trimotor airliner.

Eddie Stinson did not live to enjoy the success of his company. He died in an air crash in Chicago, Illinois on January 26, 1932, while on a sales trip. At the time of his death at age 38, Stinson had acquired more than 16,000 hours of flight time — more than any other pilot at the time.

The Stinson name did not last for long past the end of World War II. Eddie Stinson's death accelerated the assimilation of Stinson Aircraft Corporation into larger corporate entities: first by Cord Corporation, then by Aviation Corporation (AVCO), and later by Consolidated Vultee. In 1948, the Stinson company was sold to the Piper Aircraft Corporation, which continued to produce 108s for a limited time. Piper transformed an original Stinson design (the "Twin Stinson") into the successful Piper Apache, the world's first general aviation all-metal twin-engined modern aircraft.

=== Incidents ===
- 1937 Airlines of Australia Stinson crash

== Aircraft ==
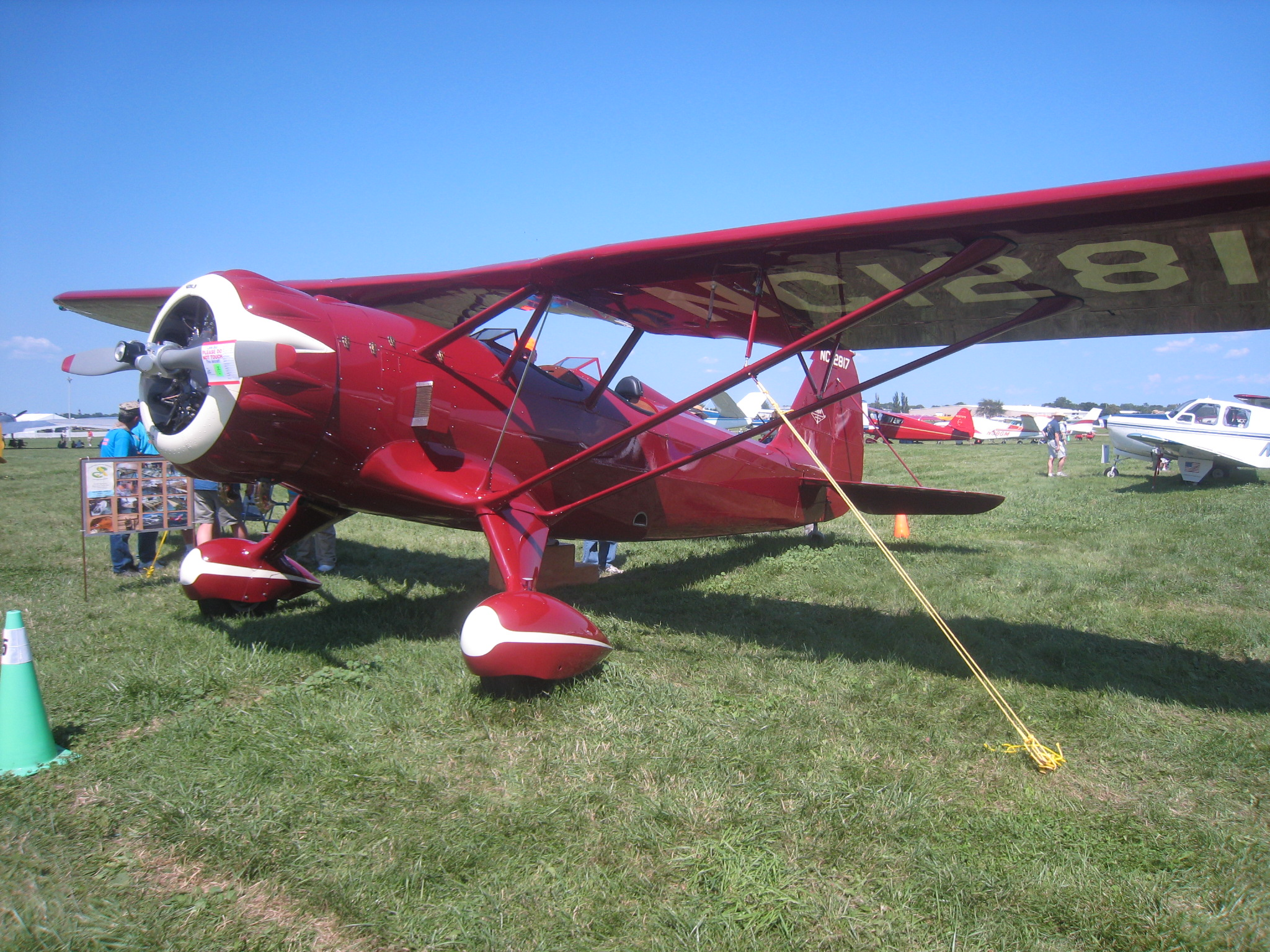
Stinson Model O

Model name	First flight	Number built	Type
Stinson SB-1 Detroiter	1926	26	Single engine cabin biplane
Stinson SM-1	1927	71+	Single engine cabin monoplane
Stinson SM-2	1928	~27	Single engine cabin monoplane
Stinson SM-3		1	Single engine cabin monoplane
Stinson SM-4		1	Single engine cabin monoplane
Stinson SM-5		1	Single engine cabin monoplane
Stinson SM-6		12	Single engine cabin monoplane
Stinson SM-7		16	Single engine cabin monoplane
Stinson SM-8		~300	Single engine cabin monoplane
Stinson SM-9		1	Twin engine monoplane flying boat
Stinson SM-6000 Airliner		53 + 24	Trimotor monoplane airliner
Stinson Model W		5	Single engine cabin monoplane
Stinson Model R	1931	39	Single engine cabin monoplane
Stinson Model O	1933	9	Single engine open cockpit monoplane
Stinson SR	1933	1,327	Single engine cabin monoplane
Stinson Model A	1934	31	Trimotor monoplane airliner
Stinson 105	1939	1,052	Single engine cabin monoplane
Stinson Model 74	1940	324	Single engine liaison monoplane
Stinson V-76 Sentinel	1941	3,896+	Single engine liaison monoplane
Stinson 108	1944	5,260	Single engine cabin monoplane
Stinson L-13	1945	2 (Note: Only two aircraft were built by Vultee-Stinson, the remaining 300 were built by Convair after Stinson was sold.)	Single engine liaison monoplane
