= Faucett F-19 =

Peruvian aircraft manufactured by Faucett

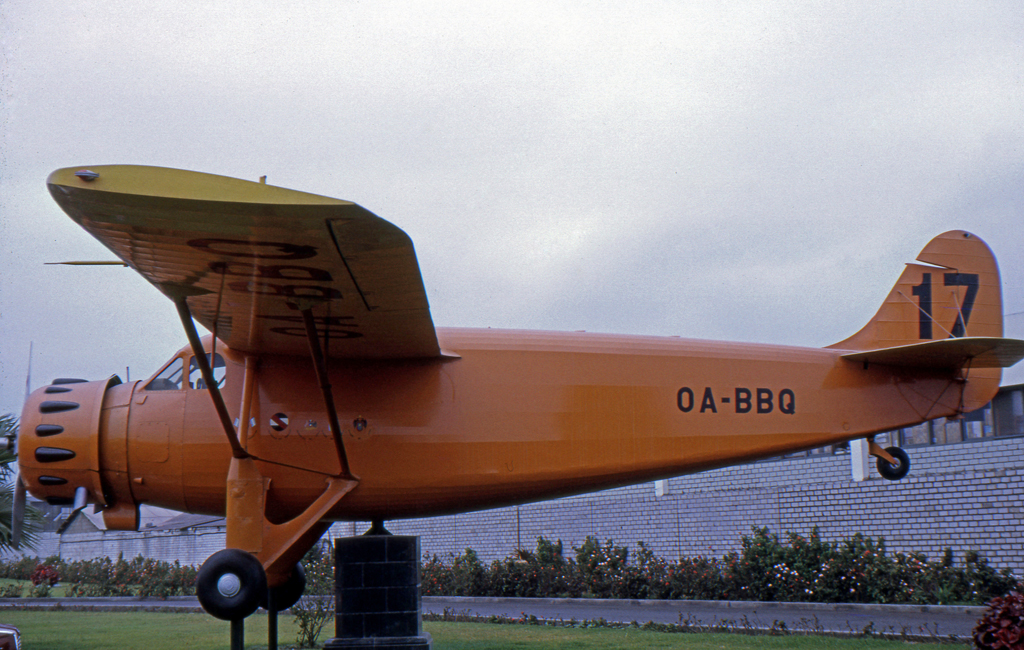
- A preserved cargo version of the F-19 at Faucett's base at Lima airport in 1972

General information
- Type: Commercial transport
- Manufacturer: Faucett
- Primary user: Faucett
- Number built: 36

History
- Manufactured: 1934-1946
- Introduction date: 1934
- First flight: 1934

The Faucett F-19 was a 1940s Peruvian eight-seat high-wing transport monoplane built by the airline Faucett Perú for its own use.

== Development ==
To meet its own requirement for an eight-seat transport the airline's engineering department designed and built the Faucett F-19. The design was based on the Stinson SM-1 Detroiter with improvements to meet the airline's specific operating requirements.

The F-19 was a high-wing braced monoplane with a fixed tailwheel landing gear or floats. The cabin sat two crew and six passengers. Some aircraft were used for cargo work with no main cabin windows. 36 examples were built between 1934 and 1946.

The aircraft was powered by an 875 hp (652 kW) Pratt & Whitney Wasp radial engine but the seaplane version used a 600 hp (447 kW) Pratt & Whitney Wasp radial engine. Most of the aircraft were built and used by the airline but a number were supplied to the Peruvian Government.

== Post-Operational History ==
By the early 1970s, at least one F-19 remained at Faucett's base at Lima Airport. A cargo-configured example was photographed in April 1972, demonstrating that the type continued to exist long after production ended.

The present-day status of the F-19 remains uncertain. The Latin American Aviation Historical Society documents surviving aircraft from the related Faucett F-10 design, including an example preserved at Grupo Aéreo N.º 3 in Callao. However, this aircraft is an F-10 rather than an F-19. No confirmed F-19 currently preserved in a museum has been identified in the sources consulted.

== Accidents and Losses ==
The Faucett F-19 was involved in at least five fatal accidents between 1937 and 1951, resulting in a total of 30 fatalities.

- 15 September 1937: A Faucett F-19 registered as OB-BBR-285 crashed near Atocongo while approaching Lima on a scheduled flight from Arica. The aircraft struck a mountainside in fog, killing all eight occupants.
- 18 September 1944: A Faucett F-19 registered as OB-BBJ-261 crashed into a mountain near Chao, Peru, in the La Libertad Region. All six occupants were killed.
- 10 September 1945: A Faucett F-19 crashed into a wooded, mountainous area near Tayabamba while flying toward Tingo María. All six occupants were killed.
- 24 October 1945: A Faucett F-19 crashed during takeoff at Tarapoto, killing all five occupants.
- 28 June 1951: A Faucett F19 registered as OB-PAR-148 crashed near Pozo Santo, in the Ica region, during a cargo flight from Lima to Tacna, with a stop in Pisco. All three occupants were killed.

== Specifications (Landplane) ==
General characteristics

- Crew: Two
- Capacity: Six passengers
- Wingspan: 17.8 m (58 ft 0.75 in)
- Height: 4.35 m (14 ft 3.25 in)
- Wing area: 40.50 m^{2} (435.95 sq ft)
- Empty weight: 2,580 kg (5,688 lb)
- Gross weight: 4,110 kg (9,061 lb)
- Powerplant: 1 × Pratt & Whitney Hornet 9-cylinder radial engine , 652 kW (875 hp)

Performance

- Maximum speed: 290 km/h (180 mph, 160 kn)
- Service ceiling: 6,705 m (22,000 ft)

== See also ==
- Faucett Perú
- FMA AeT.1

Related development

- Stinson Detroiter
