= Katherine Stinson =

American aviation pioneer (1891–1977)

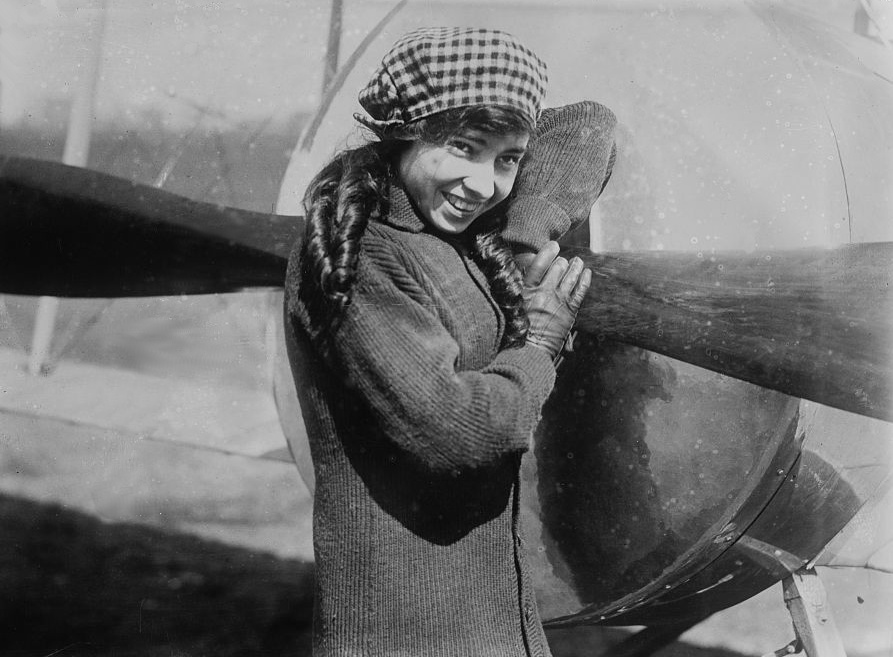
- Stinson c. 1910
- Born: February 14, 1891; Fort Payne, Alabama, U.S.
- Died: July 8, 1977 (aged 86); Santa Fe, New Mexico, U.S.
- Resting place: Santa Fe National Cemetery
- Known for: Aviator, stunt, and exhibition flying
- Spouse: Miguel Antonio Otero Jr. (m. 1927)
- Children: 4
- Relatives: Marjorie Stinson; Eddie Stinson
- Aviation career
- First flight: January 1911
- Famous flights: First female pilot to fly a loop; First female to fly for the U.S. Mail Service; First female to fly in Canada and Japan
- Flight license: July 24, 1912; Pine Bluff, AR

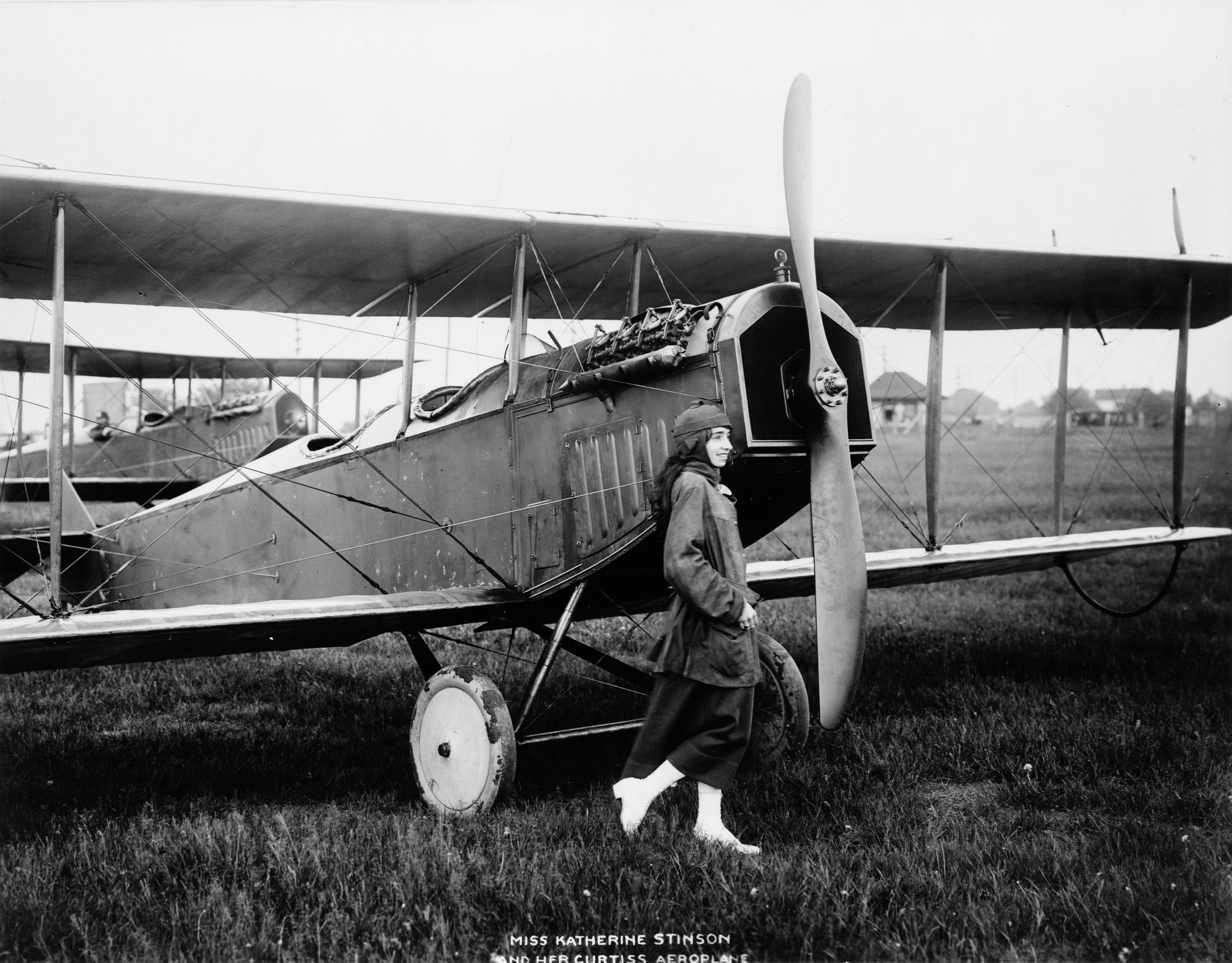
Katherine Stinson and her Curtiss airplane.

Katherine Stinson (February 14, 1891 – July 8, 1977) was an American aviation pioneer who, in 1912, became the fourth woman in the United States to earn the FAI pilot certificate. She set flying records for aerobatic maneuvers, distance, and endurance. She was the first female pilot employed by the U.S. Postal Service and the first civilian pilot to fly the mail in Canada. She was also one of the first pilots to ever fly at night and the first female pilot to fly in Canada, Japan, and China. She also was the first woman to fly over London, England.

Katherine was the first of the pioneering Stinson siblings of early aviation, who included younger sister Marjorie, and their younger brothers Eddie and Jack.

== Early life and flight training ==
Stinson was born on February 14, 1891, at Fort Payne, Alabama, to Edward Anderson Sr. and Emma Beavers Stinson. Edward Sr. left the family, leaving Emma alone to raise Stinson and her younger siblings Edward Jr., Marjorie, and John (Jack). Emma moved the family to Jackson, Mississippi, where Stinson attended high school. She excelled at music and dreamed of being a concert pianist. After she graduated from high school, the family moved to Pine Bluff, Arkansas.

Stinson learned to drive the family flivver at the age of 14. In 1911, she took her first flight aloft in a hot-air balloon in Kansas City. Smitten by the flying bug, Stinson sold her piano to help pay for flying lessons. Stinson went to St. Louis to take flight lessons from Tony Jannus, who allowed her to fly only as a passenger. She then took flying lessons from the well-known aviator Max Lillie, a pilot for the Wright Brothers, who initially refused to teach her because she was female. However, Stinson was able to solo the Wright Model B, after only four hours of instruction, on July 13, 1912, at Cicero Field.

She was the fourth woman in the United States to obtain a pilot's certificate, which she earned on July 24, 1912, at the age of 21.

== Stunt flying and world records ==
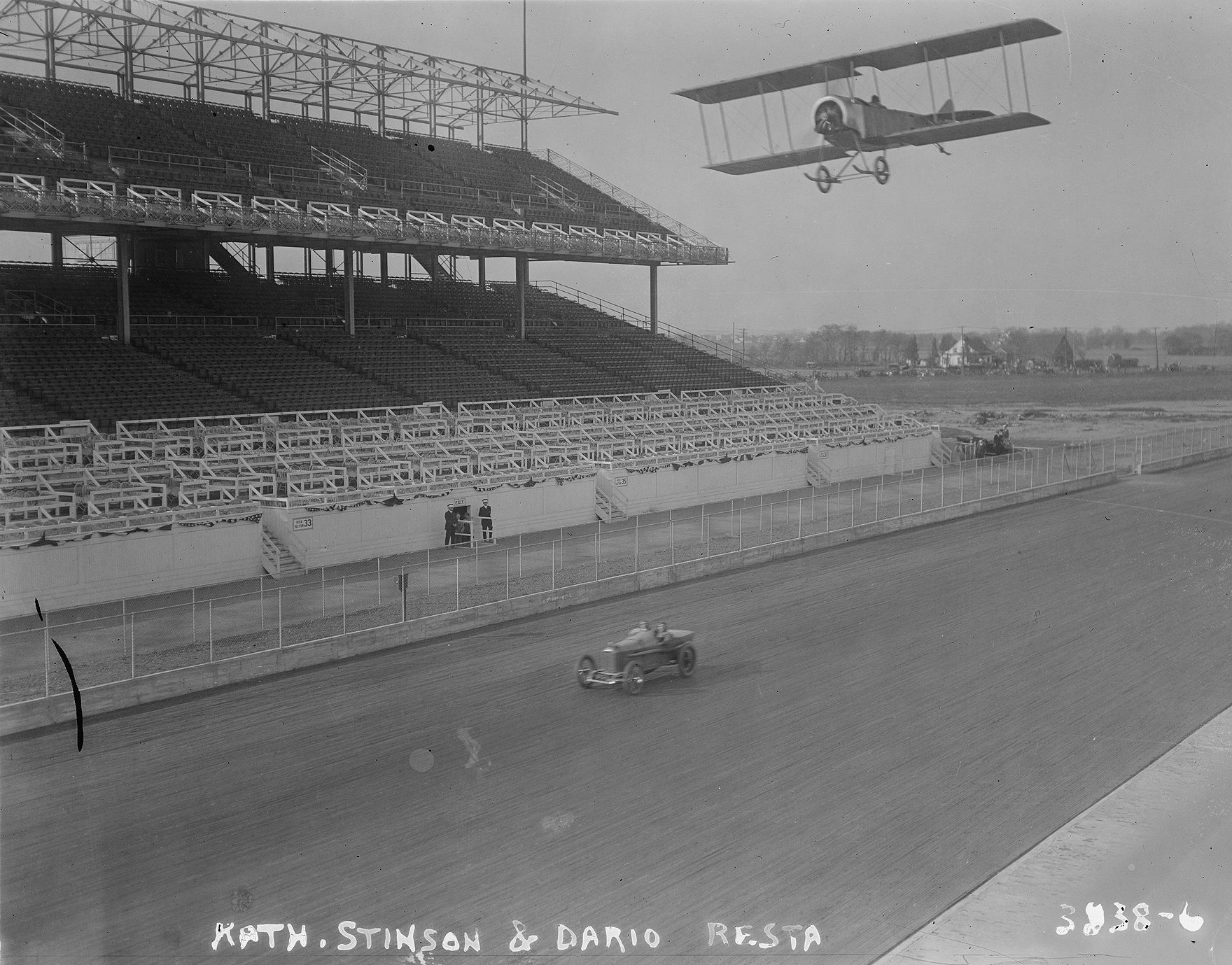
Aviatrix Katherine Stinson racing the 1916 Indy 500 champion Dario Resta

After she received her certificate, Stinson returned to her family in Hot Springs, Arkansas. Stinson and her mother, Emma, incorporated the Stinson Aviation Company in April 1913 to "manufacture, sell, rent, and otherwise engage in the aircraft trade." In May, Stinson bought a Wright B from Lillie. In July, she flew at Cincinnati's Coney Island Park, and then Columbus, Indiana in August. She then carried the first airmail at the Helena State Fair, flew at the Illinois State Fair, then El Paso; Helena, Arkansas; New Orleans; and Beaumont, Texas. Stinson then received permission to use the airplane sheds at Fort Sam Houston. She believed the San Antonio, Texas, area had an ideal flying climate.

In 1915, the Stinson family established the Stinson School of Flying, which now is Stinson Municipal Airport. Emma managed the school, Katherine financed it, Eddie worked as a mechanic, and Marjorie flight instructed. As the school grew, more planes and instructors were added.

In March 1915, the famous barnstormer Lincoln Beachey died in a crash into San Francisco Bay, and Stinson acquired the rotary engine from his wrecked plane, rebuilt it, and used it in her plane.

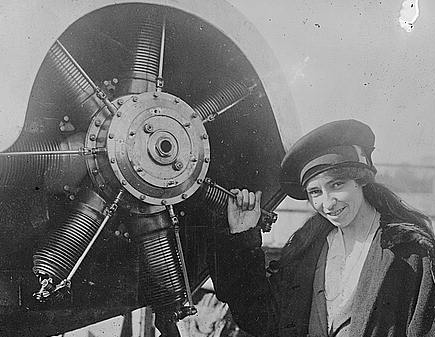
Gnome Gamma engine and Katherine Stinson doing maintenance in Japan on September 3, 1917

Stinson began exhibition flying and became known as the "Flying Schoolgirl" and "America's Sweetheart of the Air." On July 18, 1915, at Cicero Field in Chicago, Illinois, Stinson performed an inside loop (a year after Lydia Zvereva became the first woman aviator to do so), and went on to perform this feat some 500 times without a single accident. She also became one of the first pilots to ever fly at night. Adding to her night flying experience, she flew over Los Angeles with flares attached to the plane and, according to local newspapers, spelled out "CAL," becoming the first nighttime skywriter. In another publicity stunt on May 6, 1916, Stinson flew her plane in a race with Dario Resta, the 1916 Indianapolis 500 champion.

In 1917, when the United States entered World War I, and the military had a shortage of pilots, Katherine and fellow female aviator Ruth Law volunteered to fly for the military, but were refused.

In 1917, Stinson made a six-month tour of China and Japan, becoming the first female to fly in Asia. The Japanese gave her the name "Air Queen". On December 11, 1917, Stinson flew 610 miles (980 km) from San Diego to San Francisco, setting a new American non-stop distance record.

During exhibition flights in Canada, Stinson became the first civilian to fly the mail in Canada on a flight from Calgary to Edmonton, Alberta, in 1918.

Until she acquired a Curtiss JN-4D Jenny, all of her stunt flying was done in aircraft using the Wright control system, which uses two side-mounted levers for pitch and roll, with top-mounted controls for throttle and yaw. The only exception to this was her Partridge-Keller airplane, owned after the Wright plane but before the Curtiss.

=== U.S. airmail service ===
After the U.S. entered World War I in 1917, the government prohibited civilian flying to direct all aviation resources to the Army and Navy for the war effort. This caused the closure of the Stinson School in 1917. Stinson was allowed to fly a Curtiss JN-4D "Jenny" and a Curtiss Stinson-Special (a single-seat version of the JN aircraft built to her specifications) for fundraising for the American Red Cross. The fledgling U.S. Postal Air Service was the only non-military flying operation allowed by the government and the only other venue for Stinson to fly. In 1918, Stinson approached Benjamin Lipsner, superintendent of the Post Office Department airmail operations, about undertaking a long-distance mail service flight from Chicago to New York City as a publicity stunt. She encountered strong headwinds on the flight and flew non-stop from Chicago to Binghamton, New York, where she had to stop for fuel. The airplane flipped over on landing in a field and took several days to repair. Stinson then flew from Binghamton to New York City, completing the mail route.

Unable to find stable aviation work, she applied to Lipsner once again, but this time as a regular mail service pilot. She was hired and assigned to the New York City-Philadelphia route. On her first trip, she followed her instructor, veteran airmail pilot Maurice Newton, down to Philadelphia. He showed her the landmarks, emergency landing fields, and other pertinent tips for the route. The following day he followed her back to New York City to make sure she had the route mastered. The press mistakenly reported this as she had beat her instructor back to New York City in a race. This reporting caused animosity at work, and she quit the mail service after the one round-trip. Stinson then left for Paris to be an ambulance driver for the Red Cross during WWI, ending her aviation career.

== Later life ==
The weather and wartime conditions in Europe affected her health, and she came down with influenza and then tuberculosis. Returning from the war, she went to the Loomis Sanitarium in Liberty, New York, and then to the Sunmount Sanitarium in the dry climate of Santa Fe, New Mexico, in 1920 to help combat the disease. Stinson's tuberculosis diminished after four years.

In 1927, Stinson married ex-army aviator Miguel Antonio Otero Jr., a district judge and son of the former territorial governor of New Mexico. They raised four adopted children, the offspring of her brother Jack.

Stinson worked as an award winning architect and Pueblo-style home designer for years in Santa Fe, New Mexico. She designed a house for Hazel Hyde, founder of The Town School in Manhattan, New York City, who retired to Santa Fe; one for Dorothy McKibbin, "gatekeeper" of the Los Alamos atomic bomb project; one for Dr. Frank Mera, director of Sunmount Sanitarium; and for a few other notable Southwesterners. She also rented an apartment to Mary Colter, the famed Southwestern architect. One of the houses she designed belonged to anthropologist Sallie Wagner in the 1970s.

== Death and honors ==
A long period as an invalid included suffering from arteriosclerosis of the brain, dementia, pneumonia, and other illnesses or conditions. She died in Santa Fe in 1977 at the age of 86. She and her husband Miguel are buried back to back just north of the New Mexico's capital in Santa Fe National Cemetery.

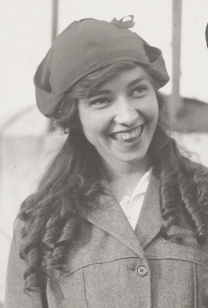
Katherine Stinson circa 1914–1915

- Stinson's flying inspired her brothers to form the Stinson Aircraft Company.
- An early Laird biplane looped by Stinson is on display at the Henry Ford Museum.
- A replica of her 1918 Curtiss Stinson-Special is on display at the Alberta Aviation Museum in Edmonton.
- The second oldest general aviation airport in the United States, Stinson Municipal Airport (KSSF) in San Antonio, Texas, was named in the Stinson family's honor.
- A middle school in northwest San Antonio, Texas, Katherine Stinson Middle School, was named in her honor.
- In 2000, Stinson was inducted into the International Air & Space Hall of Fame at the San Diego Air & Space Museum.
- Katherine Stinson's biography is featured in CBS TV series The Henry Ford's Innovation Nation, episode 54 in the series.
- In 2019, Stinson was selected to the National Aviation Hall of Fame.
