= Sweetheart pillowcase =

Souvenir

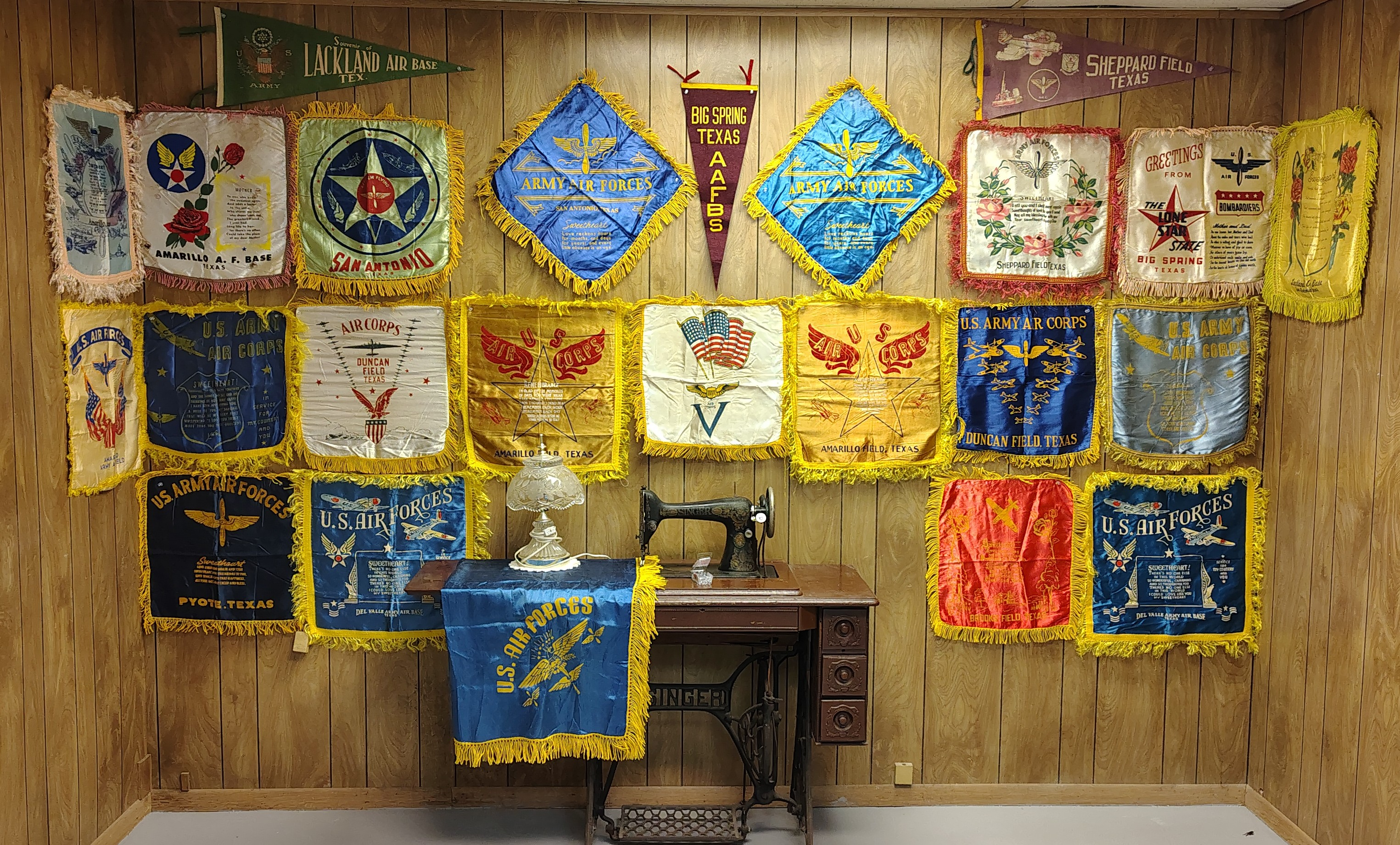
Sweetheart pillowcases from various World War II installations in Texas on display at the Stinson Chapter of the Texas Air Museum.

A sweetheart pillowcase is a souvenir designed to be sent home by servicemen during World War I and World War II. It often featured the name of the base or location where the soldier was stationed and a short poem.

== See also ==
- Short snorter
