= Stinson Junior =

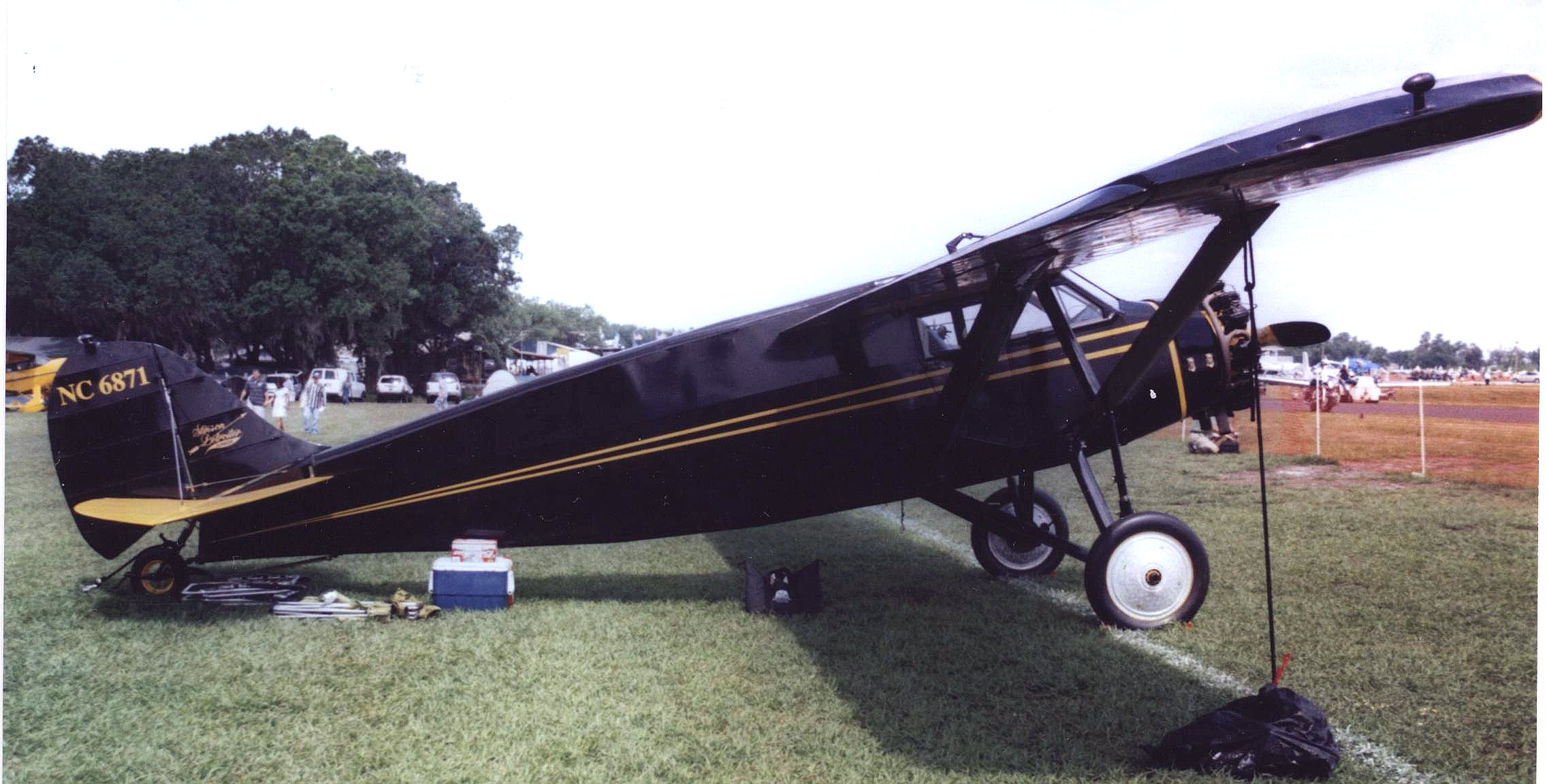
- Stinson SM-2 Junior of 1928 at the Sun N'Fun show, Lakeland, Florida in April 2007

General information
- Type: three/four-seat private civil aircraft
- National origin: United States
- Manufacturer: Stinson Aircraft Company
- Number built: 321

History
- First flight: 1928
- Developed from: Stinson Detroiter

The Stinson Junior was a high-winged American monoplane of the late 1920s, built for private owners, and was one of the first such designs to feature a fully enclosed cabin.

== Design and development ==
Stinson Aircraft had introduced their large high-winged six-seat SM-1 Detroiter in 1927. The SM-1 was sold successfully to airlines and other commercial operators, but it was too large to appeal to private owners.

Stinson therefore redesigned the aircraft with shorter span wings, shorter fuselage and a choice of less powerful engines as the SM-2 Junior. The aircraft was a strut-braced high-wing monoplane with a sturdy outrigger undercarriage which was braced against the wing support struts and the initial 110 h.p. Warner Scarab engine was normally left uncowled. The first SM-2 flew in mid-1928 and deliveries commenced that year. Later versions of the SM-2 had higher-powered engines of between 165 h.p. and 225 h.p.

The design was further developed to produce the more powerful and heavier SM-7 and SM-8 models which were full four-seaters and these were also used by commercial firms. The Junior R of 1932 had a deeper fuselage and a low-set stub wing to mount the undercarriage and wing struts.

== Operational history ==
The various Stinson Junior models were in production between 1928 and 1933, being bought by both wealthy private flyers and commercial enterprises. A total of 321 Juniors were built, of which 27 survived in 2001 and several of these were airworthy in private hands. In 1977, the Experimental Aircraft Association painted an SM-8A "Spirit of EAA", and flew a cross-country tour as the support plane with a "spirit of St. Louis" replica as part of the 50th anniversary of Lindbergh's Trans-Atlantic crossing.

== Variants ==
(per Simpson, 2001, pp. 523–524)

SM-2
100 hp (75 kW) Warner Scarab. 42 built.
SM-2K
Based on SM-2, but powered by 100 hp (75 kW) Kinner K-5 engine. Three built 1929.
SM-2AA
Wright J6-5 165 h.p.
SM-2AB
Wright J5 220 h.p.
SM-2AC
Wright J6-7 225 h.p.
SM-2ACS
floatplane version of the SM-2AC
SM-7A
Powered by 300 hp (220 kW) Wright J6-9. Eight built.
SM-7B
Powered by 300 hp (220 kW) Pratt & Whitney R-985 Wasp Junior. Eight built.
SM-8A
Powered by 210–215 hp (157–160 kW) Lycoming R-680. 230 built.
SM-8B
Powered by 225 hp (168 kW) Wright J6-7. Five built.
SM-8D
225 hp (168 kW) Packard DR-980 diesel. Two built.
Junior R
Lycoming R-680 215 h.p. and deeper fuselage. 28 Units built
Junior R-2
Lycomong R-680-BA 240 h.p. 3 Built.
Junior R-3
as R-2 with retractable undercarriage 3 Units built.
Junior R-3-S
Lycoming R-680-6 245 h.p.
Junior S
Lycoming R-680 215 h.p. with fully cowled engine
Junior W
generally similar to the SM-7B, powered by a Wasp Junior engine

== Specifications (SM-2AC) ==
Data from The Aircraft of the World

General characteristics

- Crew: 1
- Capacity: 3 passengers
- Length: 29 ft 0 in (8.84 m)
- Wingspan: 41 ft 8 in (12.70 m)
- Height: 8 ft 3 in (2.51 m)
- Wing area: 236 sq ft (21.9 m^{2})
- Airfoil: Clark Y
- Empty weight: 2,169 lb (984 kg)
- Gross weight: 3,229 lb (1,465 kg)
- Fuel capacity: 70 US gal (58 imp gal; 260 L)
- Powerplant: 1 × Wright Whirlwind J6-7 nine-cylinder radial air-cooled , 225 hp (168 kW)

Performance

- Maximum speed: 135 mph (217 km/h, 117 kn)
- Cruise speed: 113 mph (182 km/h, 98 kn)
- Range: 450 mi (720 km, 390 nmi)
- Service ceiling: 22,000 ft (6,700 m)
- Rate of climb: 1,200 ft/min (6.1 m/s)
