= Edward Stinson =

Aviation pioneer and entrepreneur (1893-1932)

Edward Anderson Stinson, Jr.
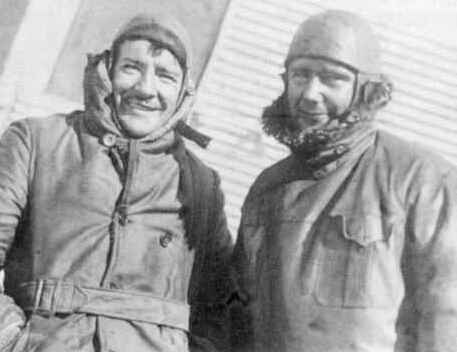
- Stinson and Lloyd Wilson Bertaud 1921
- Born: July 11, 1893; Fort Payne, Alabama, U.S.
- Died: January 26, 1932 (aged 38); Jackson Park Golf Course, Chicago, Illinois, U.S.
- Cause of death: Air crash
- Spouse: Estelle
- Parent(s): Edward Anderson Stinson, Sr. Emma B. Beavers
- Relatives: Katherine Stinson; Marjorie Stinson; Jack Stinson

Edward Anderson ("Eddie") Stinson, Jr. (July 11, 1893 – January 26, 1932) was an American pilot and aircraft manufacturer. He was the founder of Stinson Aircraft Company, one of America's first manufacturers of enclosed-cabin aircraft, and commercial airliners. At the time of his death in 1932 in an air crash, he was the world's most experienced pilot in flight hours, with over 16,000 hours logged.

Eddie — who began his career as an early flight instructor and famed exhibition pilot — was one of the pioneering Stinson siblings of early aviation, who included his older sisters, Katherine and Marjorie, and his younger brother, Jack.

== Biography ==
Stinson was born on July 11, 1893, in Fort Payne, Alabama. His oldest sister, Katherine, was a famous early female aviator — for whom he worked as a mechanic — and he wanted to fly as well. In September 1913, he learned to fly at the Wright School in Dayton, Ohio, from Roderick L. Wright. He then helped support the family's Stinson School of Flying, at the Stinson Municipal Airport, in Texas — earning his FAI certificate in 1915.

In World War I, Eddie served as a flight instructor for the United States Army Air Service at Kelly Field. By 1917, he had become one of the first American flight instructors to teach pilots how to successfully recover from an aerodynamic spin, one of the principal causes of fatal airplane crashes, especially in the early years of aviation.

After the war, Eddie gained national notoriety as a stunt flyer — particularly famous for exhibition "races" between his airplane and a race car driven by Barney Oldfield. To enable the aircraft to land in stunningly small spaces, such as the infield of a horse racing track, he developed and installed the first practical landing gear brakes on an airplane.

In 1921, he set a world endurance record for flight, and the following year, he worked as a test pilot for the Stout Engineering Company, becoming the test pilot for the all-metal Stout ST-1 bomber.

In 1925, Stinson led a group of Detroit investors in building a new commercial aircraft, forming the Stinson Aircraft Syndicate. The prototype SB-1 Detroiter made its first test flight on 25 January 1926, and its first public flight in early February. This was one of the first enclosed-cabin aircraft, and the nation's first enclosed commercial passenger airliner. This would lead to a series of successful aircraft designs built by the Stinson Aircraft Company.

Though richly profitable as an exhibition flyer and aviation entrepreneur, Stinson lived a wildly lavish, flamboyant and costly lifestyle — including extensive public drinking of alcoholic beverages, even during the era of Prohibition, when such were officially illegal — ultimately resulting in frequent severe financial hardships.

Stinson moved into a large home in Dearborn, Michigan, where he lived until his death.

Stinson died from injuries sustained while making an emergency landing in the prototype Stinson Model R. He was making a demonstration flight from Chicago when the aircraft ran out of fuel over Lake Michigan. The aircraft's wing sheared off after striking a flagpole while attempting to land on a golf course. Three other passengers were injured.

== Sources ==
- Wegg, John (1990). General Dynamics Aircraft and their Predecessors. London: Putnam. ISBN 0-85177-833-X.
