= Huron Regional Airport =

Airport in South Dakota, US

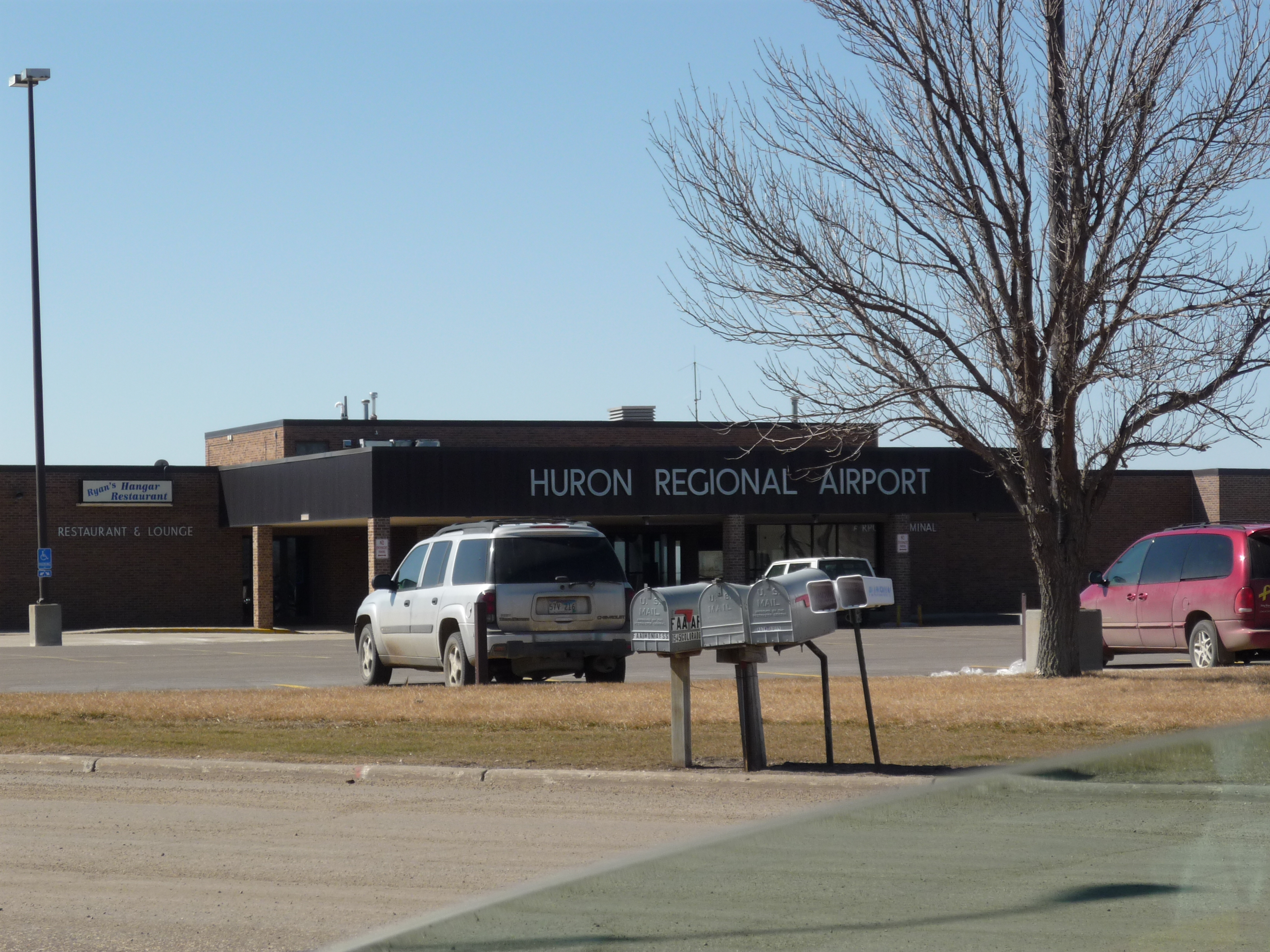
- Airport terminal, March 2009
- IATA: HON; ICAO: KHON; FAA LID: HON

Summary
- Airport type: Public
- Owner: City of Huron
- Serves: Huron, South Dakota
- Elevation AMSL: 1,289 ft (393 m)
- Coordinates: 44°23′07″N 098°13′43″W
- Website: FlyHuron.com/

Map
- Location within South Dakota Location within the United States

Runways
Direction	Length		Surface
Direction	ft	m	Surface
12/30	7,201	2,195	Concrete
17/35	5,000	1,524	Concrete

Statistics (2022)
- Aircraft operations (year ending 8/24/2022): 12,200
- Based aircraft: 21
- Source: Federal Aviation Administration

Huron Regional Airport (IATA: HON, ICAO: KHON, FAA LID: HON) is in Huron, South Dakota, United States. The airport has charter passenger flights operated by fixed base operator (FBO), Fly Jet Center and Revv Aviation.

Federal Aviation Administration records say the airport had 2,365 passenger boardings (enplanements) in calendar year 2008, 2,170 in 2009 and 2,016 in 2010. The National Plan of Integrated Airport Systems for 2015–2019 categorized it as a general aviation airport (the commercial service category requires at least 2,500 enplanements per year).

== History ==
The airport opened as the W. W. Howes Municipal Airport, in 1937, named in honor of William Washington Howes, First Assistant Postmaster General under Franklin Roosevelt. Howes brought airmail service to the Midwest. The airport hangar, pictured below, was named the W. W. Howes hangar in 1998 due to the efforts of Howes' grandson, Dr. Whiting Wicker. The current terminal was opened in 1979.

=== Past airline service ===
Airline flights at Huron began in the 1930s operated by Hanford's Tri-State Airlines (which became Mid-Continent Airlines, a Braniff International Airways predecessor) and also by Inland Air Lines (a Western Airlines predecessor). In 1948 Western Douglas DC-3s stopped at Huron on a multi-stop route between Denver and Minneapolis/St. Paul. By 1956, the airport was part of multi-stop route flown by Western with Convair 240s between Los Angeles and Minneapolis/St. Paul with this flight also serving Las Vegas and Salt Lake City. In 1958 Braniff was serving Huron with a daily multi-stop DC-3 flight linking Minneapolis/St. Paul with Omaha and Kansas City. In 1964 Western was operating larger Douglas DC-6B four engine propliners into the airport on a multi-stop service between Salt Lake City and Minneapolis/St. Paul. Braniff pulled out of Huron in 1959 and Western pulled out at the beginning of 1965.

North Central Airlines DC-3s arrived at Huron around 1959; in 1962 the airport had international service of a sorts as North Central was operating a daily DC-3 flight with a routing of Regina, Saskatchewan - Minot - Bismarck, ND/Mandan, ND - Aberdeen, SD - Huron - Mitchell, SD - Sioux Falls - Sioux City - Omaha. In 1965 North Central was serving Huron with Convair 440s and in 1967 with Convair 580s. By 1972 all North Central flights from Huron were operated with Convair 580 turboprops. In 1979, North Central merged with Southern Airways to form Republic Airlines (1979-1986) which continued to serve Huron with Convair 580s until the end of 1981. Republic was acquired by and merged into Northwest Airlines in 1986.

In 1981 Northern Airlines, a commuter airline, was flying from Huron to Minneapolis/St. Paul, Sioux Falls, Rapid City and Pierre, SD.

By 1982, Mesaba Aviation operating as an independent commuter air carrier was operating direct one stop service to Minneapolis/St. Paul via either Brookings, SD or Mitchell, SD with Beechcraft 99 commuter turboprops. Mesaba then became a Northwest Airlink affiliate and was operating code sharing service on behalf of Northwest Airlines to Minneapolis/St. Paul by the mid 1980s. According to Northwest Airlines timetables, the Northwest Airlink service operated by Mesaba to Minneapolis/St. Paul with commuter propjets such as the Fairchild Swearingen Metroliner lasted through 1990 but had been discontinued by early 1991.

Following cessation of service by Mesaba Aviation operating as Northwest Airlink, during the early 1990s independent commuter air carrier GP Express Airlines operated direct Beechcraft 1900 commuter propjet service to Minneapolis/St. Paul via a stop in either Brookings, SD or Mitchell, SD.

By the spring of 2005, Air Midwest, a division of Mesa Airlines, was operating direct one stop service from Omaha via Brookings, SD with Beechcraft 1900 commuter propjets.

According to the Official Airline Guide (OAG) as well as the FlightAware website, the airport currently does not have any scheduled passenger airline service.

== Facilities and aircraft ==
The hangar

Huron Regional Airport covers 1,235 acres (500 ha) at an elevation of 1,289 feet (393 m) above mean sea level. It has two concrete runways: 12/30 is 7,201 by 100 feet (2,195 x 30 m) and 17/35 is 5,000 by 75 feet (1,524 x 23 m).

In the year ending August 24, 2022, the airport had 12,200 aircraft operations, averaging 33 per day. Of these, 98% were general aviation, and 2% military. 21 aircraft were then based at this airport, 16 single-engine, 3 multi-engine and 2 jet.

== See also ==
- List of airports in South Dakota

== Other sources ==
- Essential Air Service documents (Docket OST-2000-7138) from the U.S. Department of Transportation:
  - Order 2004-7-5 (July 6, 2004): selects Great Lakes Aviation, Ltd. to continue providing subsidized essential air service at Pierre, and Air Midwest to provide subsidized essential air service at Brookings and Huron, for a two-year period. Great Lakes' service at Pierre is to consist of 12 weekly nonstop round trips to Denver with 19-seat Beech 1900-D aircraft, at an annual subsidy of $449,912. Air Midwest's service at Brookings and Huron is to consist of 12 weekly flights routed Huron-Brookings-Omaha-Brookings-Huron, with 19-seat Beech 1900-D aircraft, at an annual subsidy of $2,078,727.
  - Order 2006-8-11 (August 11, 2006): selecting Great Lakes Aviation, Ltd., to provide subsidized essential air service (EAS) at Brookings and Huron, South Dakota, consisting of two daily one-stop round trips to Denver International Airport, at annual subsidy rates of $1,212,400, and $793,733, respectively, beginning October 1, 2006.
  - Order 2008-7-34 (July 31, 2008): re-selecting Great Lakes Aviation, Ltd., to continue to provide subsidized essential air service (EAS) at Huron, South Dakota, for the two-year period beginning October 1, 2008, at the annual subsidy rate of $1,781,159.
  - Order 2010-8-12 (August 25, 2010): selecting Great Lakes Aviation, Ltd., to continue providing subsidized essential air service (EAS) at Huron, South Dakota, for the two-year period beginning October 1, 2010, at the annual subsidy rate $1,742,886.
