= KXLG =

- Milbank, South Dakota; United States
- Broadcast area: Watertown, South Dakota
- Frequency: 99.1 MHz
- Branding: 99.1 KXLG

Programming
- Format: Soft adult contemporary
- Affiliations: ABC News Radio

Ownership
- Owner: TMRG Broadcasting, LLC; (TMRG Broadcasting, LLC)

History
- First air date: 1981 (as KURO)
- Former call signs: KURO (1981–1991); KGTR (1991–1993); KZNC (1993–2009)

Technical information
- Licensing authority: FCC
- Facility ID: 15262
- Class: C2
- ERP: 37,000 watts
- HAAT: 167 meters (548 feet)
- Transmitter coordinates: 45°1′10″N 96°56′43″W

Links
- Public license information: Public file; LMS
- Webcast: Listen Live
- Website: mykxlg.com

KXLG (99.1 FM) is a radio station serving the Watertown, South Dakota area (licensed to serve Milbank, South Dakota). The station is owned by TMRG Broadcasting, LLC. It airs soft adult contemporary music to fill time between local business advertising features. The advertising features often include live on-site broadcasts or telephone "interviews" with local business operators.

== History ==
former KZNC logo

The station signed on in 1981 originally serving the Huron, South Dakota area. It most recently had a country format as KZNC Kissin Country 99.

In December 2003, Dakota Communications Ltd. (Duane Butt, president) reached an agreement to acquire this station and KIJV from Three Eagles Communications as part of a two-station deal for a reported $400,000. Dakota Communications has operated Huron's other two licensed radio stations, KOKK and KORN-FM, since 1975.

A group of long-time Watertown area radio veterans acquired this license to form a new station in 2009. The station was assigned the KXLG call letters by the Federal Communications Commission on April 14 of that year. In September 2009, the station was moved to Watertown, South Dakota (licensed to Milbank) and flipped to the current adult contemporary/local advertising feature format. From 2009 to 2014, KXLG broadcast from the Old Post Office, a historic building in Watertown. On April 1, 2012 the license was transferred to TMRG Broadcasting, LLC. Comedian Timmy Williams joined KXLG as an announcer in 2015.
