= Stinson Airliner =

1930 American airliner family

SM-6000 Airliner
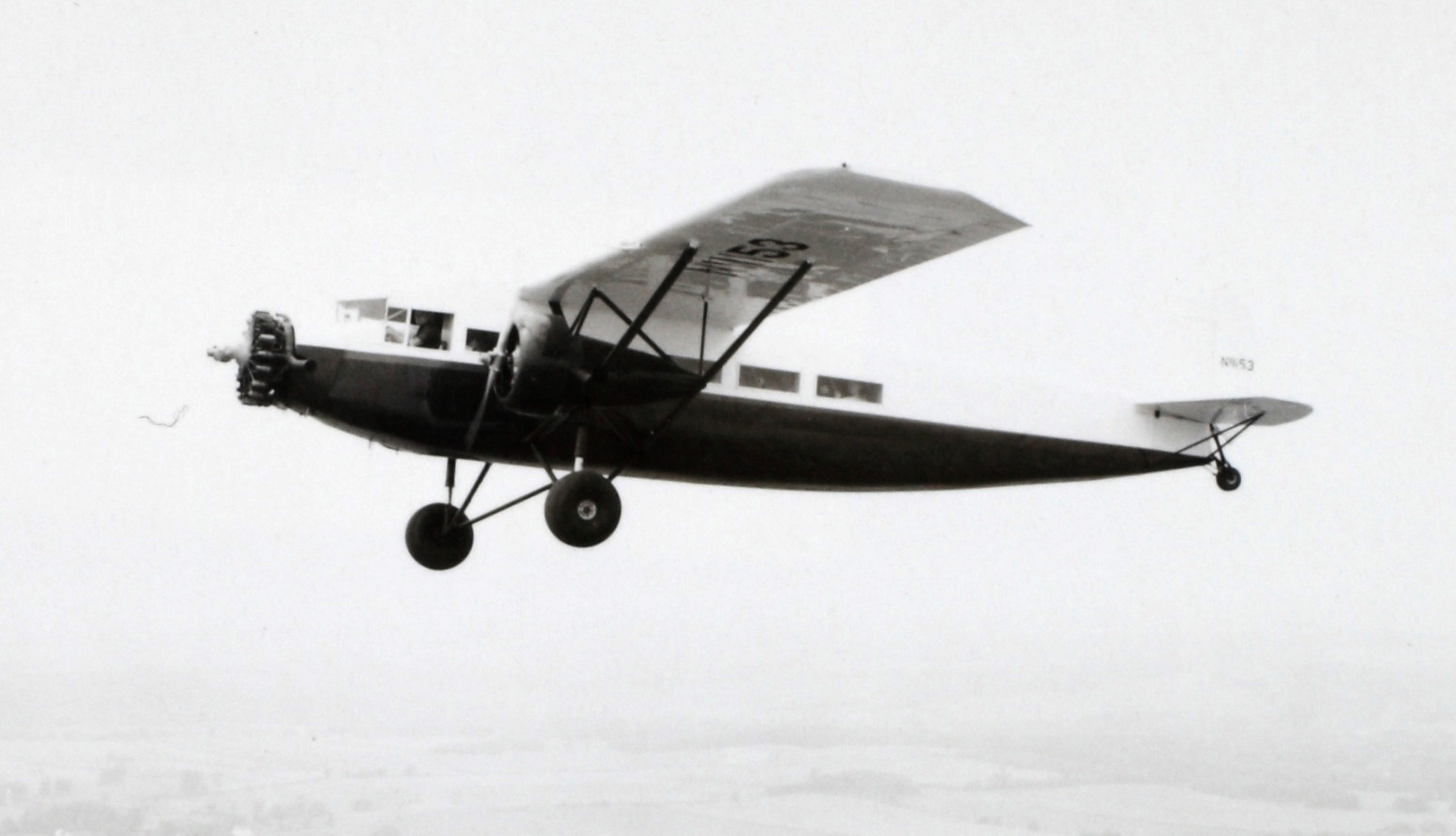
- Stinson SM-6000B Airliner trimotor circa 1965 when owned by RP Rice of Kennett, MO.

General information
- Type: Three-engined airliner
- National origin: United States
- Manufacturer: Stinson Aircraft Corporation
- Number built: 53 (SM-6000); 24 (Model U)

The Stinson SM-6000 Airliner is a 1930s three-engined (trimotor) ten-passenger airliner designed and built by the Stinson Aircraft Corporation. The SM-6000 was a high-wing braced monoplane with room for a pilot and a cabin for ten passengers. It was powered by three 215 hp (160 kW) Lycoming R-680 engines strut-mounted one each side above the main landing gear units and one in the nose. A number of variants were built mainly with improved interiors. In 1932 the Model U Airliner was produced which had low-set stub wings with additional two engines mounted on each wing complementing the existing nose mounted center engine.

== Variants ==
Corman 6000
The initial prototypes produced by the Corman aircraft Co. as part of the E L Cord empire.
SM-6000 Airliner
1930 initial production variant with three 215hp (160kW) Lycoming R-680 engines.
SM-6000-A Airliner
1930 variant available with different interior configurations.

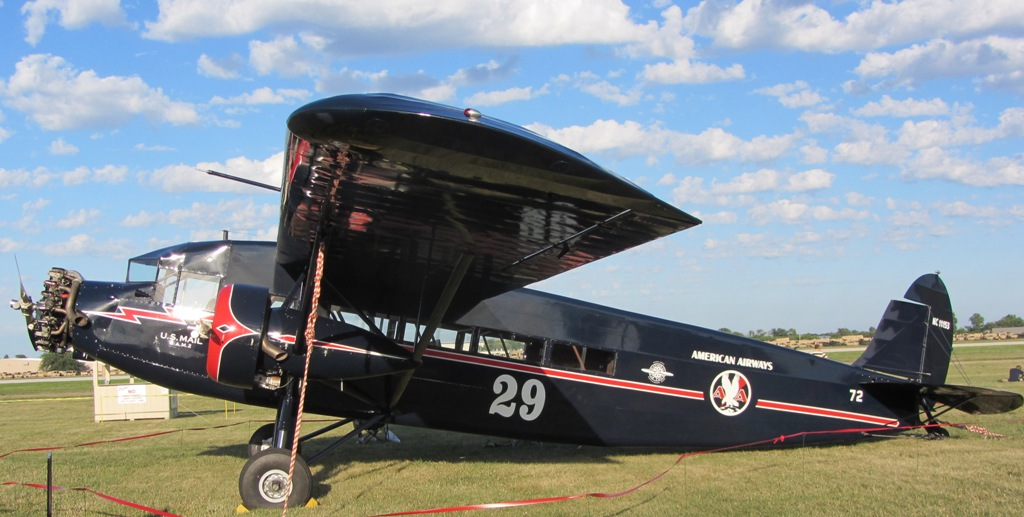
SM-6000-B

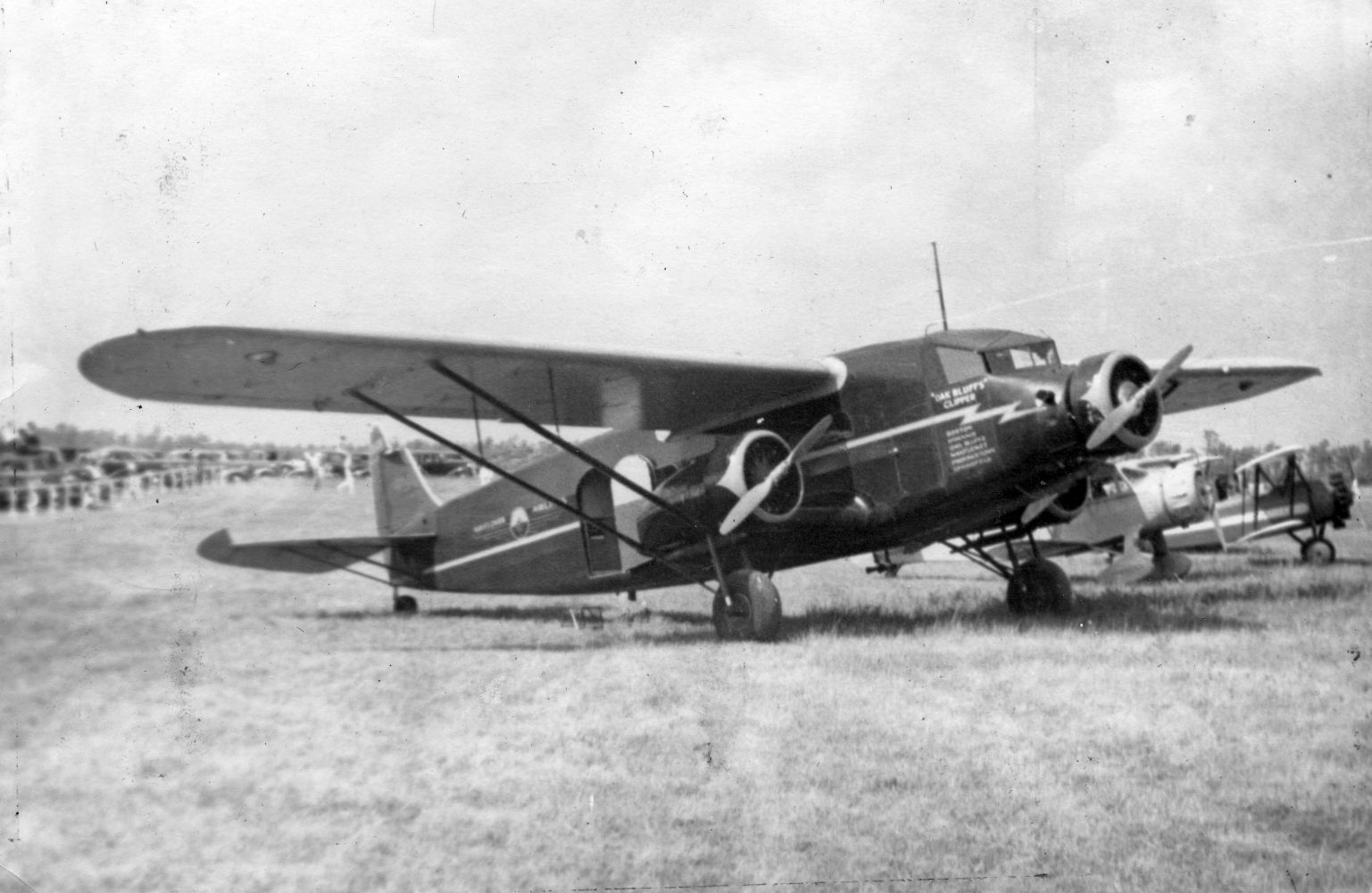
Stinson U of Mayflower Airlines

SM-6000-B1 Airliner
1931 all-passenger variant with better interior equipment.
SM-6000-B2 Airliner
As the B1 but with a mixed mail/passenger interior.
Model U Airliner
1932 improved model with three 240hp (179kW) Lycoming R-680-BA engines on stub wings.
C-91
United States military designation for one SM-6000-A (s/n 42-79547) impressed into service in 1942.

== Operators ==
United States

- American Airways
- Boston-Maine Central Vermont Airways
- Century Airlines
- Chesapeake Airways
- Chicago and Southern Airlines
- Delta Air Lines
- Mayflower Airlines
- National Airlines System
- New York, Philadelphia and Washington Airway Corporation aka Ludington Airline
- Rapid Air Lines

Philippines

- INAEC Iloilo Negros Air Express Company

== Surviving aircraft ==
Only two of these high-wing models are known to exist. One is owned and operated by Mid America Flight Museum in Mount Pleasant, TX, the other by Kermit Weeks and is maintained in airworthy condition at Fantasy of Flight in Polk City, Florida.

== Specifications (SM-6000-B) ==
Data from

General characteristics

- Crew: two
- Capacity: ten (B1), eight (B2)
- Length: 42 ft 0 in (12.8 m)
- Wingspan: 60 ft 0 in (18.29 m)
- Height: 12 ft 0 in (3.66 m)
- Wing area: 490 sq ft (45.6 m^{2})
- Empty weight: 5,670 lb (2,620 kg)
- Gross weight: 8,600 lb (3,910 kg)
- Powerplant: 3 × Lycoming R-680 , 215 hp (160 kW) each

Performance

- Maximum speed: 146 mph (234 km/h, 127 kn)
- Cruise speed: 125 mph (200 km/h, 109 kn)
- Range: 390 mi (628 km, 340 nmi)
- Service ceiling: 14,200 ft (4,330 m)
- Rate of climb: 1,000 ft/min (5.1 m/s)
