= KZNC =

KZNC may refer to:

- KZNC (FM), a radio station (91.9 FM) licensed to serve Red Dog Mine Port, Alaska, United States
- KXLG, a radio station (99.1 FM) licensed to serve Milbank, South Dakota, United States, which held the call sign KZNC from 1993 to 2009
- KZNC Party DJs, a mobile DJ Service out of La Crosse, Kansas, United States
