= Lycoming R-680 =

1920s American aircraft piston engine

R-680
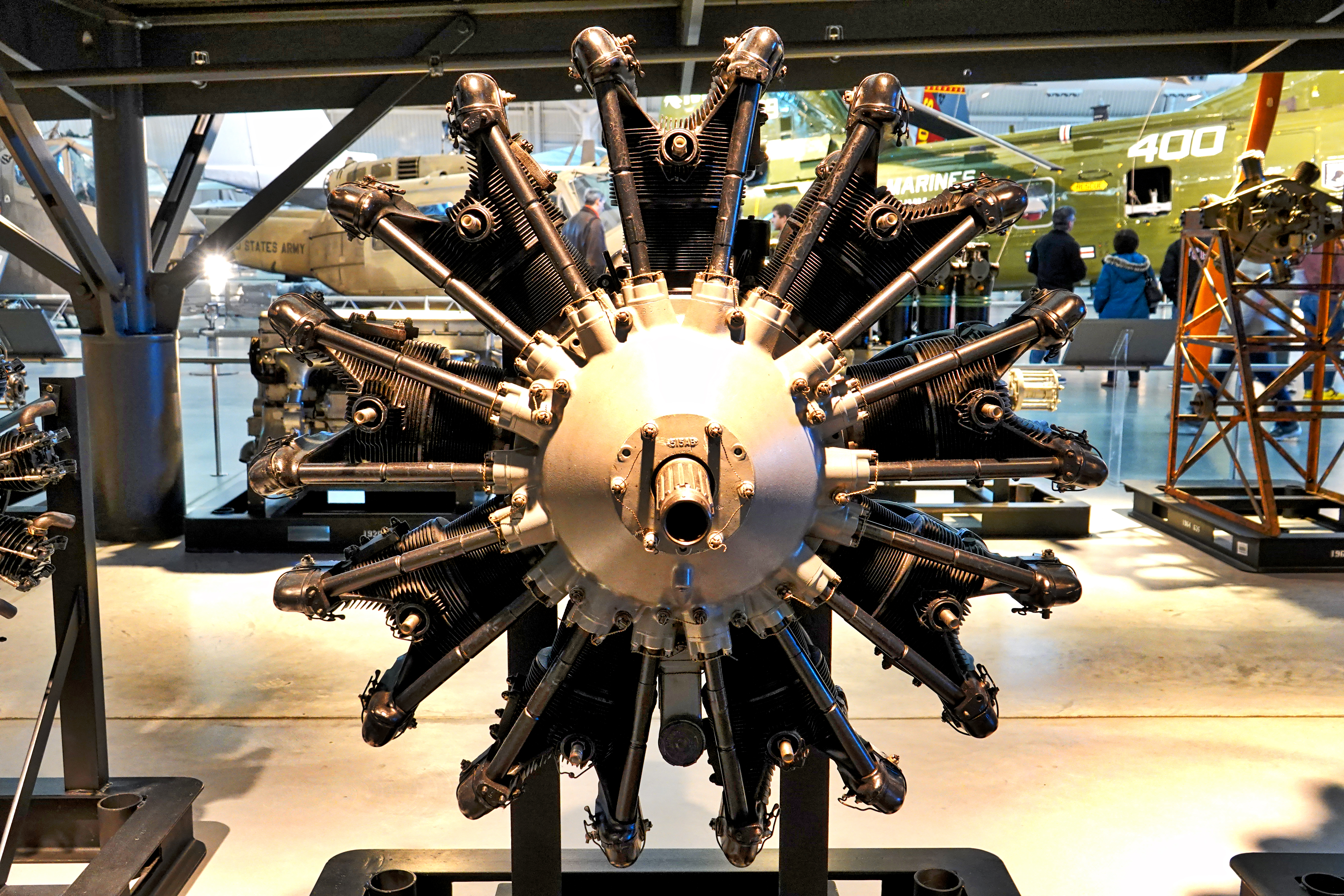
- Lycoming R-680
- Type: Piston aero-engine
- National origin: United States
- Manufacturer: Lycoming Engines
- First run: 1929
- Major applications: Beechcraft AT-10 Wichita; Stinson Reliant; Curtiss-Wright AT-9; Stinson Airliner
- Manufactured: 1930–1945
- Number built: 26,000+

The Lycoming R-680 is a nine-cylinder air-cooled radial engine, the first aero engine produced by Lycoming. The engine was produced in two types, the E and B series; both are essentially the same. The B4E was available in a trainer version with a front exhaust collector "ring" for use without cylinder air baffles. The R-680 received Approved Type Certificate No. 42 on 4 Feb 1930.

== History ==
The engine was granted an approved type certificate by late February 1930. It was shortly thereafter exhibited at the International Aircraft Exposition in St. Louis and placed in production.

== Variants ==
R-680
Rated at 210 hp (160 kW) at 2,000 rpm.
R-680-B4D
225 hp (168 kW) at 2,100 rpm.
R-680-B4E
Rated at 225 hp (168 kW) at 2,100 rpm.
R-680-BA
Rated at 240 hp (180 kW)
R-680-E3A
Rated at 285 hp (213 kW) at 2,200 rpm.
R-680-E3B
Rated at 285 hp (213 kW) at 2,200 rpm.

R-680-5
Military version of R-680-B4B.
R-680-6
Rated at 245 hp (183 kW)
R-680-7
Military version of R-680-B4C.
R-680-8
Military version of R-680-B4D.
R-680-9
Rated at 300 hp (220 kW) at 2,200 rpm.
R-680-11
Military version of R-680-B4D.
R-680-13
Rated at 300 hp (220 kW) at 2,200 rpm.
R-680-17
Military version of R-680-B4E.

== Applications ==
- Beech AT-10 Wichita
- Boeing-Stearman PT-13
- Cessna AT-8/AT-17
- Curtiss-Wright AT-9
- Fleetwings BQ-2
- Spartan NP-1
- Stinson Airliner
- Stinson Reliant
- Stinson L-1 Vigilant
- Travel Air 4000
- Waco S Series

== Specifications (R-680-E3A) ==
Data from Jane's Fighting Aircraft of World War II.

=== General characteristics ===
- Type: Nine-cylinder air-cooled radial
- Bore: 4 5/8 in (117 mm)
- Stroke: 4 1/2 in (114 mm)
- Displacement: 680 in³ (11.15 litres)
- Length: 37.5 in (953.1 mm)
- Diameter: 43.5 in (1104 mm)
- Dry weight: 515.46 lb (233.9 kg)

=== Components ===
- Valvetrain: One inlet and one exhaust valve per cylinder at 30 degrees.
- Fuel system: single-barrel carburetor
- Fuel type: 87 octane rating gasoline
- Oil system: Full pressure type
- Cooling system: Air-cooled

=== Performance ===
- Power output: 330 hp (246 kW) at 2,300 rpm at sea level
- Compression ratio: 7:1
- Power-to-weight ratio: 0.64 hp/lb (1.05 kW/kg)

== See also ==
Comparable engines

- Bristol Jupiter
- Continental R-670
- Jacobs R-755
- Pratt & Whitney R-985
- Wright R-790 Whirlwind

Related lists

- List of aircraft engines
