= KIJV =

- Huron, South Dakota; United States
- Frequency: 1340 kHz
- Branding: Tiger 95

Programming
- Format: Adult contemporary
- Affiliations: ABC News Radio

Ownership
- Owner: Carolyn and Doyle Becker; (Riverfront Broadcasting, LLC)
- Sister stations: KOKK, KJRV

History
- First air date: September 23, 1947

Technical information
- Licensing authority: FCC
- Facility ID: 15264
- Class: C
- Power: 1,000 watts
- ERP: 250 watts (FM translator)
- Transmitter coordinates: 44°20′45″N 98°12′35″W
- Translator: 95.3 K237EL (Huron)

Links
- Public license information: Public file; LMS
- Webcast: Listen Live

Former branding.

KIJV (1340 AM) is a radio station licensed to serve Huron, South Dakota. The station is owned by Carolyn and Doyle Becker, through licensee Riverfront Broadcasting, LLC, and airs an adult contemporary music format.

The station was assigned the KIJV call sign by the Federal Communications Commission.

== Ownership ==
In December 2003, Dakota Communications Ltd. (Duane Butt, president) reached an agreement to acquire this station and KZNC from Three Eagles Communications as part of a two-station deal for a reported $400,000. Dakota Communications has operated Huron's other two licensed radio stations, KOKK and KJRV-FM, since 1975.

In August 2013, KIJV dropped its Oldies format in favor for Hot Adult Contemporary. Dakota Communications had previously operated a Hot AC format in the Huron market before moving KXLG to the Watertown, South Dakota market.

Effective December 31, 2022, Dakota Communications sold KIJV, sister stations KJRV and KOKK, and translator K237EL to Riverfront Broadcasting for $255,000.

== History ==
KIJV began broadcasting June 30, 1947, as a Mutual affiliate (supplemented by transcriptions from NBC) on 1340 kHz with 250 W power. The first program featured civic officials and musicians from Huron College. The station was owned by the James Valley Broadcast Company.

In the 1960s, the station wanted to upgrade from 250 watts to 500 watts. The upgrade would prove problematic, because of CFSL in Weyburn, Saskatchewan, then on the same frequency.

Eventually, CFSL deleted its allotment on 1340, moving to 1190. The move allowed KIJV to upgrade its power, eventually to 1,000 watts.
