= KJRV =

- Wessington Springs, South Dakota; United States
- Broadcast area: Huron-Mitchell
- Frequency: 93.3 MHz
- Branding: Big Jim 93.3

Programming
- Format: Classic rock
- Affiliations: ABC News Radio

Ownership
- Owner: Carolyn and Doyle Becker; (Riverfront Broadcasting, LLC)
- Sister stations: KIJV, KOKK

History
- First air date: 2005

Technical information
- Licensing authority: FCC
- Facility ID: 89615
- Class: C1
- ERP: 65,000 watts
- HAAT: 190 meters (623 feet)
- Transmitter coordinates: 44°11′39″N 98°19′5″W

Links
- Public license information: Public file; LMS
- Webcast: Listen Live
- Website: huronradio.com

KJRV (93.3 FM, "Big Jim 93.3") is a radio station licensed to serve Wessington Springs, South Dakota serving the Huron-Mitchell area. The station is owned by Carolyn and Doyle Becker, through licensee Riverfront Broadcasting, LLC. It airs a classic rock music format.

The station was assigned the KJRV call sign by the Federal Communications Commission on June 22, 2005.
