= South Dakota State Fair =

Annual state fair in South Dakota, USA

Coordinates: 44.364°N 98.231°W

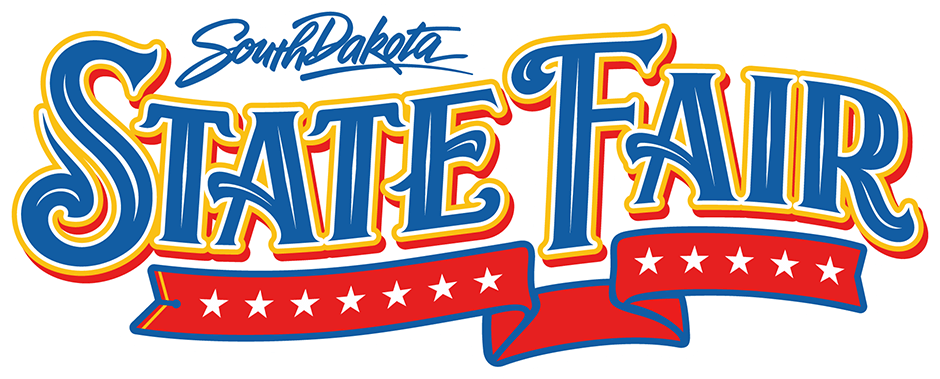
- "The Big One"
- Genre: State fair
- Dates: 6 days
- Locations: South Dakota State Fairgrounds; Huron, South Dakota, United States
- Years active: 1885–1916, 1919-41, 1946-2019, 2021-
- Next event: 9-01 to 9-06-2027
- Attendance: 211,371 (2016); 0 (2020)
- Area: 180 acres (73 ha)
- Website: Official Website

The South Dakota State Fair is an annual state fair held in Huron, South Dakota. It is held for five days over the national Labor Day Weekend, concluding on Monday of the following week. The fair is mainly operated by the South Dakota Department of Agriculture and Natural Resources, but many other government departments such as the South Dakota Department of Game, Fish & Parks participate and feature venues at the fair.

Security guards, the Huron, SD Police, Beadle County Sheriff's Office and South Dakota Highway Patrol are the fair's patrollers.
