= Trunk carrier =

Type of US airline in the regulated era (1938–1978)

Contiguous United States routes flown by trunk carriers in 1953. The key to the map is in the lower left hand corner

Trunk carriers, also known as trunk airlines, trunklines or trunks, were US scheduled airlines certificated in the period 1939–1941 by the Civil Aeronautics Authority (CAA) or its immediate successor, the Civil Aeronautics Board (CAB) after the passage of the 1938 Civil Aeronautics Act on the basis of grandfathering: those carriers that were able to show they performed scheduled service prior to the passage of the act. During the regulated period (1938–1978) these carriers were an especially protected class, with the CAB regulating the industry in many respects in the interests of these companies, a form of regulatory capture. The importance of these carriers is reflected in the fact that in 2026, the three largest airlines in the United States, American Airlines, Delta Air Lines and United Airlines were among the carriers certificated through this grandfathering in 1939.

The CAB tightly regulated the industry and categorized airlines by function, the name of the trunk carriers reflected their role, the airlines that flew the main domestic (or trunk) routes. By contrast, a later group of CAB-regulated domestic carriers, first certificated in a five-year period after World War II, were known as local service carriers or feeder carriers, again names reflecting their purpose within the CAB-regulated industry.

== History ==
=== Grandfathering ===
The Civil Aeronautics Act of 1938 established a tight regulatory regime for the US airline industry. Airlines were required to be certificated by the Civil Aeronautics Authority (after 1940, this function was inherited by the Civil Aeronautics Board). However, carriers that could show they had engaged in bona fide airline service prior to passage of the 1938 act were entitled to be grandfathered.

Table 1: Grandfather certificate applications under 1938 Civil Aeronautics Act and 1948 ASMs^{(1)} for resulting trunk carriers(1) ASM = Available seat mile: one passenger seat, available for sale, flown one mile. A flight with 150 seats flown 2000 miles generates 150×2000 = 300,000 ASMs
Applicant name	Final name	Disposition	Appl. decision date	1948 ASMs (mm)
Airline Feeder System		Application rejected	9 June 1939	
American Airlines	American Airlines	Still existent 2026	9 May 1939	2,241.88
Boston-Maine Airways	Northeast Airlines	Merged into Delta 1972	31 May 1939	108.47
Braniff Airways	Braniff International Airways	Collapsed 1982	18 July 1939	357.72
Canadian Colonial Airways	Colonial Airlines	Merged into Eastern 1956	9 January 1940	94.56
Chicago and Southern Air Lines	Chicago and Southern Air Lines	Merged into Delta 1953	17 March 1939	215.88
Condor Air Lines		Application rejected	8 March 1940	
Continental Air Lines	Continental Airlines	Merged into United 2010	9 March 1939	116.44
Delta Air Lines	Delta Air Lines	Still extant 2026	25 February 1939	351.65
Eastern Air Lines	Eastern Air Lines	Collapsed 1991	9 June 1939	1,678.47
Inland Air Lines	Inland Air Lines	Merged into Western 1952	28 March 1939	45.53
Marquette Airlines	Marquette Airlines	Merged into TWA 1940	19 July 1939	
Mayflower Airlines	Mayflower Airlines	Merged into Northeast 1944	31 July 1940	
Mid-Continent Airlines	Mid-Continent Airlines	Merged into Braniff 1952	7 March 1939	159.48
National Airlines	National Airlines	Merged into Pan Am 1980	14 March 1939	256.30
Northwest Airlines	Northwest Airlines	Merged into Delta 2008	14 March 1939	683.32
Pennsylvania-Central Airlines	Capital Airlines	Merged into United 1961	21 April 1939	562.54
Railway Express Agency		Application rejected	13 March 1941	
Transcontinental & Western Air (TWA)	Trans World Airlines (TWA)	Merged into American 2001	16 June 1939	1,907.16
Tri-State Aviation	Tri-State Aviation	Certification revoked 1943	31 July 1940	
United Air Lines	United Airlines	Still extant 2026	22 May 1939	1,843.73
Western Air Express	Western Airlines	Merged into Delta 1987	7 April 1939	195.95
Wilmington-Catalina Airline	Catalina Air Transport	Ceased operation 1942	13 October 1939	

=== Unsuccessful grandfather applicants ===
Between 1939 and 1941, the CAA/CAB considered 23 grandfather applications by US domestic airlines, as reflected in the CAA/CAB Reports in which CAA/CAB decisions were recorded. Of these applicants, three were denied. Two of these, Airline Feeder System (an east coast airline) and Condor Air Lines (in the San Francisco Bay Area) were denied on the basis of service interruptions and financial weakness. Another applicant, Railway Express Agency, was not an operating airline, but rather a freight forwarder who worked with airlines, and the CAB saw no reason it should be certificated.

=== Unexploited or short-lived grandfather certifications ===
Two grandfather applicants received certification but failed to launch certificated service:

- Mayflower Airlines was a Massachusetts-based airline that had flown to Cape Cod, Martha’s Vinyard and Nantucket prior to passage of the Act. However, Mayflower never flew while certificated and in 1944, the CAB approved the merger of the airline into Northeast, effectively transferring Mayflower’s route authority to Northeast.
- Tri-State Aviation was certificated for freight-only operations in Maryland, Pennsylvania and West Virginia. Before it could start operation, the carrier was sold. The new owner continued to delay the start of operations several times until the CAB revoked the carrier’s certification in 1943.

Two grandfathered carriers had brief existences as certificated carriers.

Marquette Airlines was certificated to fly from St Louis to Detroit but outsourced its operation to TWA (which at that time stood for Transcontinental & Western Air) in August 1940, and then sold out completely to TWA in December.

Wilmington-Catalina Airline was founded by the Wrigley family in 1931 and flew two small amphibious aircraft from the Port of Los Angeles to Santa Catalina Island. 1941 plans for expansion using land-based aircraft were ended by the start of World War II, which forced the airline to cease operation in 1942. The company never resumed airline operations of its own, though it contracted with United Air Lines to operate on its behalf 1946–1954.

=== Protected class ===
The 16 grandfathered carriers that continued to operate were the trunk carriers or trunk airlines or trunk lines or trunks. Note the category encompassed airlines that were originally strikingly different in size. In 1948, American was well over 20 times the size of Colonial by ASMs, as Table 1 shows.

As Table 1 also shows, six (Capital, Chicago & Southern, Colonial, Inland, Mid-Continent, Northeast) of the 16 trunk carriers merged out of existence during the regulated period, 1938–1978, leaving 10 trunks as US airline deregulation dawned in 1979: American, Braniff, Continental, Delta, Eastern, National, Northwest, TWA, United and Western.

The CAB saw the trunks as a special category of airline to be particularly protected:

- Until shortly before deregulation, the CAB did not authorize a single airline to compete with trunklines on an equal basis.
- Once the trunk airlines were certificated, the CAB’s view was their number comprised a sufficient number of airlines, no others were needed.
- When the local service carriers (or “feeder airlines”) were created to bring air service into small cities, the CAB took particular care to ensure they did not compete with the trunk carriers, seeing itself as having an obligation to the trunks to protect them from competition.

Over time, local service carriers did come to compete with trunk carriers to a degree. In permitting local service carriers to enter some trunk routes, the CAB was motivated in significant part by a desire to reduce government subsidy paid to local service carriers, a process known as “route strengthening.”

Further, some local service carrier routes were assigned to trunks. For instance, in 1950, some of the routes originally awarded to Parks Air Lines, a local service carrier, were handed to Mid-Continent Airlines, a trunk airline, after Parks failed to start operation in a timely manner. And in 1955, the CAB also permitted a merger between a trunk airline and a local service carrier, when Continental Air Lines bought Pioneer Air Lines. So the division between local service carriers and trunks was far from absolute.

However, as Table 2 below shows, the distinction between trunk airline and local service airline remained meaningful even in 1978, the last year of the regulated era. Relative to local service carriers, even the smallest trunk airlines flew substantially greater seat-miles and distances and with substantially larger aircraft.

=== Domestic as of 1938 ===
It’s worth considering what airlines were not trunks. What mattered was flying domestic routes in 1938, where “domestic” was the continental United States, since until 1959, Hawaii and Alaska were territories, not states. Pan Am was not a trunk carrier, because as of 1938 it did not fly domestic service. A number of other carriers were certificated to fly routes outside the continental United States by the CAB, such as Panagra and Trans Caribbean, none of these counted as trunks either.

Similarly, there were carriers certificated as, originally, territorial carriers, such as Hawaiian Airlines and Caribair in Puerto Rico.

Table 2: 1978 CAB-regulated trunk and local service carriers, including revenues and select statistics(1) USD mm(2) Available Seat Miles: an ASM is one seat available for sale flown one mile(3) Average seats per flight weighted by miles flown(4) Average flight distance
Airline	Airline type	Op rev^{(1)}	Sched ASMs (bn)^{(2)}	Avg Seats/ Mile^{(3)}	Stage length (mi)^{(4)}
American Airlines	trunk	2,736.4	45.49	154.2	799.8
Braniff Airways	trunk	966.5	17.84	138.5	583.1
Continental Air Lines	trunk	772.0	14.53	155.2	618.5
Delta Air Lines	trunk	2,241.6	37.55	151.5	457.9
Eastern Air Lines	trunk	2,379.6	39.06	135.5	509.1
National Airlines	trunk	636.4	13.83	174.1	694.5
Northwest Airlines	trunk	794.4	14.30	226.2	667.2
Trans World Airlines	trunk	2,474.7	42.65	165.0	897.1
United Air Lines	trunk	3,523.4	61.94	161.2	694.8
Western Air Lines	trunk	834.5	15.76	147.9	645.6
Allegheny Airlines	local svc	566.8	6.72	90.4	242.5
Frontier Airlines	local svc	287.2	3.77	81.6	230.2
Hughes Air Corp dba Hughes Airwest	local svc	313.2	4.18	94.6	282.0
North Central Airlines	local svc	298.5	3.09	90.0	147.6
Ozark Air Lines	local svc	229.7	2.70	87.3	195.9
Piedmont Airlines	local svc	205.6	2.62	85.7	180.7
Southern Airways	local svc	188.5	2.45	76.0	206.5
Texas International Airlines	local svc	181.7	2.60	90.8	304.5

== Legacy ==
Thirteen of the original 19 passenger grandfather certificates from the 1938 Act are still represented in the industry as of 2024.

Six of the grandfather certificates were merged into Delta over time (as well as Delta's own grandfather certificate):

- Chicago and Southern
- Inland
- Mayflower
- Northeast
- Northwest
- Western

Two of the grandfather certificates were merged into American over time (as well as American's own grandfather certificate):

- TWA
- Marquette

Two of the grandfather certificates were merged into United over time (as well as United's own grandfather certificate):

- Capital
- Continental
