= Mayflower Airlines =

US airline (1936–1944) folded into Northeast

- Founded: 22 June 1935
- Commenced operations: June 15, 1936
- Ceased operations: September 1939 (remains folded into Northeast Airlines in 1944)
- Headquarters: Massachusetts

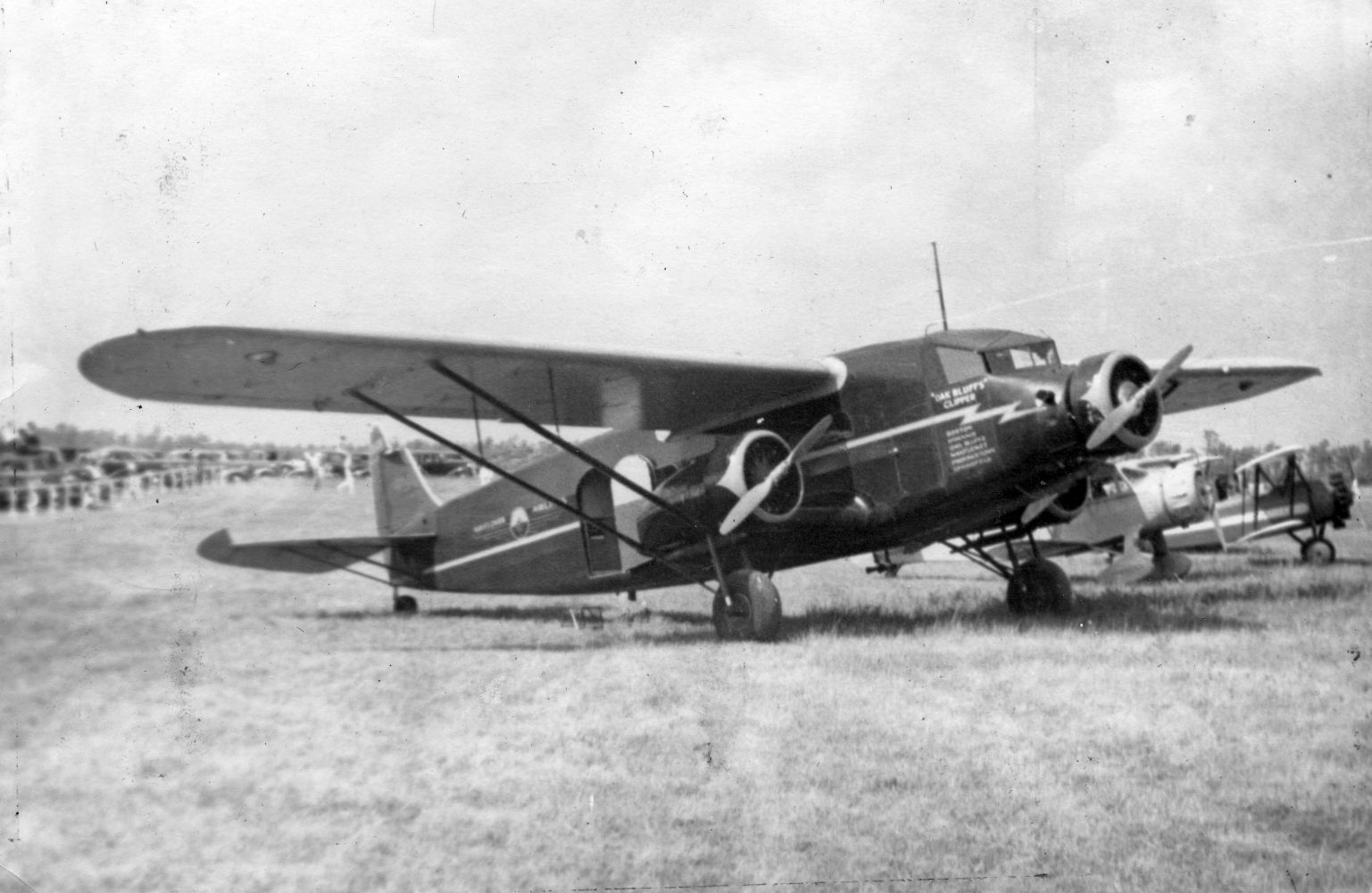
Stinson U

Mayflower Airlines was a small United States scheduled airline founded June 22, 1935 that started operations on June 15, 1936 flying from Boston to Cape Cod, Nantucket and Martha's Vineyard on a seasonal basis before World War II. Mayflower operated Stinson Model U Trimotors. The airline applied to be certificated on October 20, 1938 by the Civil Aeronautics Board (CAB) on the basis of operating scheduled service before the Civil Aeronautics Act of 1938. Certification was received by the CAB on July 31, 1940. But Mayflower did not operate after September 1939, although it had CAB approval of such suspension of service. By 1944, Mayflower was bankrupt with all of $300 in cash so in June the CAB permitted the merger of Mayflower into Northeast Airlines.

The fact that Mayflower was certificated by the CAB on the basis of pre-Civil Aeronautics Act scheduled service in theory made it a trunk carrier, in the same category as any other United States airline with the same basis for certification, like Continental Airlines or Braniff. But Mayflower never actually operated as such, making it an odd edge case.

== See also ==
- Northeast Airlines
- List of defunct airlines of the United States
