= Marquette Airlines =

US airline (1938–1940) that merged into TWA

IATA	ICAO	Call sign
-	-	-
- Founded: 11 January 1938; 88 years ago incorporated in Delaware
- Commenced operations: 14 May 1938; 88 years ago
- Ceased operations: 15 August 1940; 85 years ago routes leased to TWA
- Destinations: 5
- Headquarters: St. Louis, Missouri
- Key people: Wink Kratz

Marquette Airlines was a brief-lived trunk air carrier, a United States scheduled airline that operated between St. Louis to Detroit from 1938 to 1940 before merging into Transcontinental & Western Air (TWA).

== History ==
Marquette was founded in 1938 by Winston Weidner "Wink" Kratz, a 33-year-old pilot. It began scheduled service on the St. Louis - Cincinnati - Dayton - Toledo - Detroit route on May 14, 1938, with service four days a week, which soon expanded to six days a week, using Stinson Model A tri-motor aircraft. Marquette's line connected with the coast-to-coast route of TWA at St. Louis and Dayton. TWA saw the airline as a potential competitor and opposed Marquette's application for an operating certificate. However, the Civil Aeronautics Authority (CAA) certificated Marquette on July 18, 1939 under the grandfather statute (the CAA certificated airlines that could show a bona fide history of operation before the date of the Civil Aeronautics Act of 1938 that created the CAA).

TWA agreed to acquire Marquette in October 1939, subject to CAA approval. But between then and July 3, 1940, when the acquisition was denied, the airline regulatory functions of the CAA had become the Civil Aeronautics Board (CAB), which said, regarding TWA's application to purchase Marquette for US$350,000, that "it would be clearly adverse to the public interest" for Marquette's operating certificate "to be treated as if it were a speculative security." The CAB approved the acquisition December 18, 1940 for two reasons:

- Reduced purchase price
- TWA demonstrated that the route would be more valuable to itself than to Marquette by leasing the route from Marquette as of August 15, 1940. Ridership jumped dramatically, which allowed to the CAB to attribute the purchase price to something other than just the speculative value of the Marquette certificate

TWA operation of the route allowed TWA to serve Cincinnati and Detroit for the first time, and offer service from Cincinnati to Pittsburgh and New York. TWA replaced Marquette's Stinson trimotors with newer Douglas DC-2s. The CAB announced on October 18, 1941, that TWA could formally acquire Marquette, by which time the airlines were merged in all but name.

Tata Sons Ltd., the predecessor of Air India, acquired five of Marquette's Stinson aircraft in 1941 following the requisition of its larger aircraft for war purposes.

== Destinations ==
As shown in historical timetables:

- Cincinnati, Ohio
- Dayton, Ohio
- St. Louis, Missouri
- Toledo, Ohio
- Detroit, Michigan

== See also ==
- List of defunct airlines of the United States
- Transcontinental & Western Air (TWA)
