= Chicago and Southern Air Lines =

US airline that merged into Delta in 1953

IATA	ICAO	Call sign
CS	CSA	C & S
- Founded: June 15, 1933; 93 years ago (incorporated in California as Pacific Seaboard Air Lines)
- Commenced operations: June 25, 1933; 93 years ago
- Ceased operations: May 1, 1953; 73 years ago (merged into Delta Air Lines)
- Headquarters: Memphis, Tennessee, U.S.
- Founder: Carleton Putnam

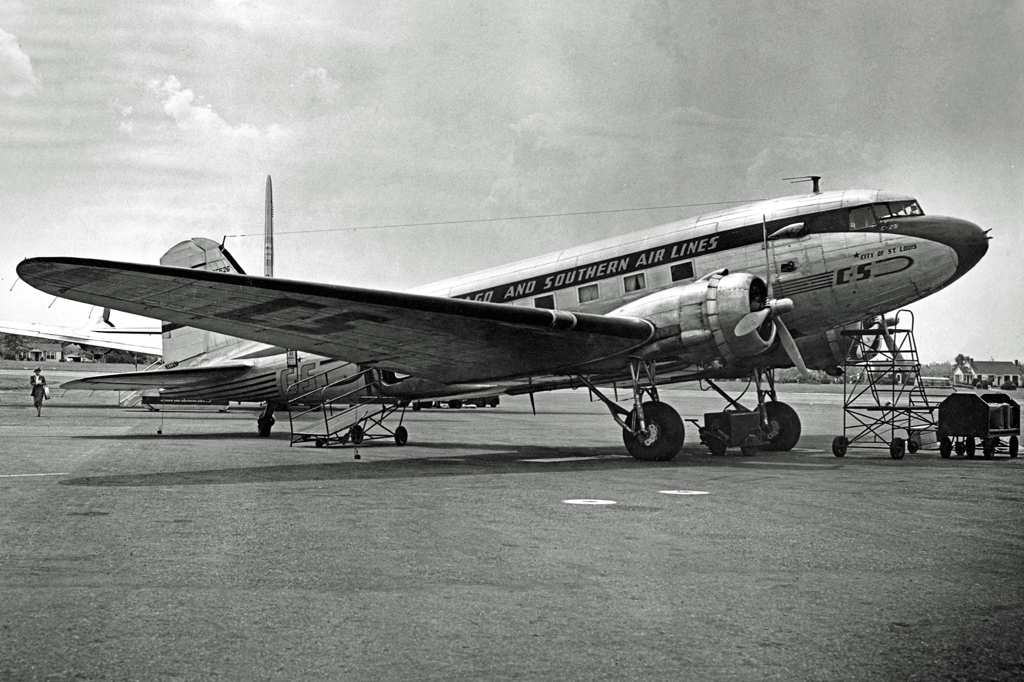
C&S Douglas DC-3 "City of St Louis" at St Louis airport

Chicago and Southern Air Lines (C&S) was a United States trunk carrier, a scheduled airline that started life as Pacific Seaboard Air Lines in California and was organized on June 15, 1933. Following the move from California, the airline's headquarters were initially located in St. Louis, Missouri, and were then moved to Memphis, Tennessee, which also served as a hub for the carrier. C&S was merged into Delta Air Lines in 1953, thus providing Delta with its first international routes.

== History ==
=== California carrier ===
Pacific Seaboard Air Lines was incorporated in California on June 15, 1933. The first service was operated on June 25, 1933, in Carleton Putnam's single engine Bellanca CH-300 "Miss San Jose," Putnam piloting the aircraft. Three Bellanca CH-300s were flown in the California operation. The new airline only flew passengers on the West Coast of California on "The Scenic Route." This route was up the coast of California from Los Angeles (Grand Central Air Terminal at Glendale) to San Francisco's Mills Field. Stops were made at seven destinations located near or on the Pacific Ocean including Santa Barbara, Santa Maria, San Luis Obispo, Paso Robles, Monterey, Salinas and San Jose. For a short period, Pacific Seaboard Air Lines also flew from San Francisco to the capital of California, Sacramento. The primary competition on the L.A.-San Francisco route was United Airlines with twin-engine, ten-passenger, Boeing 247s. United, which also flew the San Joaquin Valley route in California, had the U.S. Air Mail contract and more comfortable aircraft. Putnam decided the only way he could stay in business was to get a U.S. Air Mail contract. In four months and one week, 1113 passengers were carried.

=== Mississippi Valley airmail contract ===
On February 9, 1934, President Franklin D. Roosevelt canceled all the U.S. Mail contracts. The U.S. Army operated the air postal service for a few weeks, and then the government called for new bids on the Air Mail routes. Putnam bid on and received the Air Mail route between Chicago and New Orleans by way of Peoria, Springfield, St. Louis, Memphis, and Jackson (Air Mail Route 8). Two more Bellanca CH-300s were purchased, bringing that fleet to five aircraft. Putnam had to start service in 30 days or forfeit his US$50,000 (equivalent to $1.2 million in 2025) performance bond. Air mail service started June 3, 1934, and passenger service started June 13 with the five Bellancas on "The Valley Level Route." The airline changed its name to Chicago and Southern Air Lines in 1935.

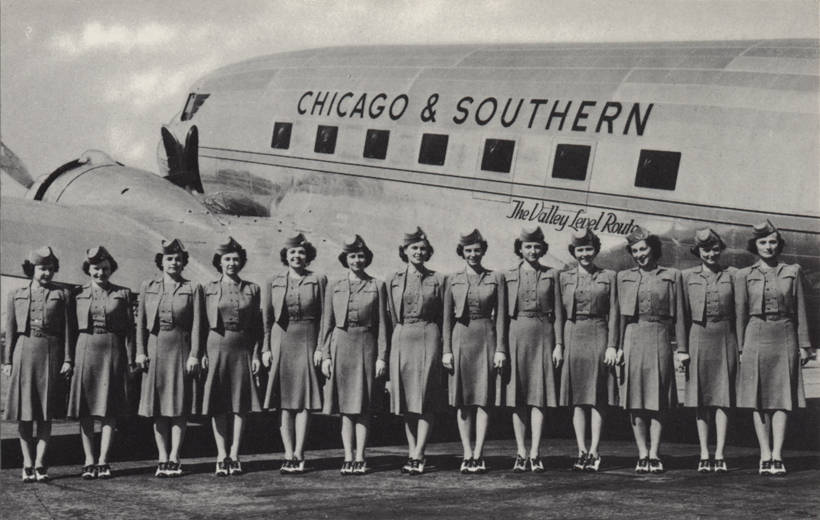
1940

=== Trunk carrier ===
The 1938 Civil Aeronautics Act imposed a new regulatory regime on the US airline business. All airlines required certification by the new Civil Aeronautics Authority (CAA), but as an airline flying scheduled service prior to the Act, C&S qualified for certification by grandfathering, which it received 17 March 1939. The CAA's regulatory role was spun off to the Civil Aeronautics Board (CAB) in 1940. Thereafter, C&S would be regulated by the CAB as a trunk carrier.

The June 1, 1940, Chicago & Southern timetable described the "Valley Level Route" as being "900 Miles of Flat Country" between Chicago and New Orleans via Memphis, with "Fine Airports" and "A Splendid Airway". Chicago and Southern continued flying north to south routes in the Midwest, bringing air service to smaller markets such as Evansville, Indiana, and Paducah, Kentucky. The airline acquired its first Douglas DC-3 in 1940 and continued to operate the type until the 1953 merger with Delta Air Lines. Several four-engined Douglas DC-4s were also operated postwar including on international routes to Cuba, Jamaica and Venezuela.

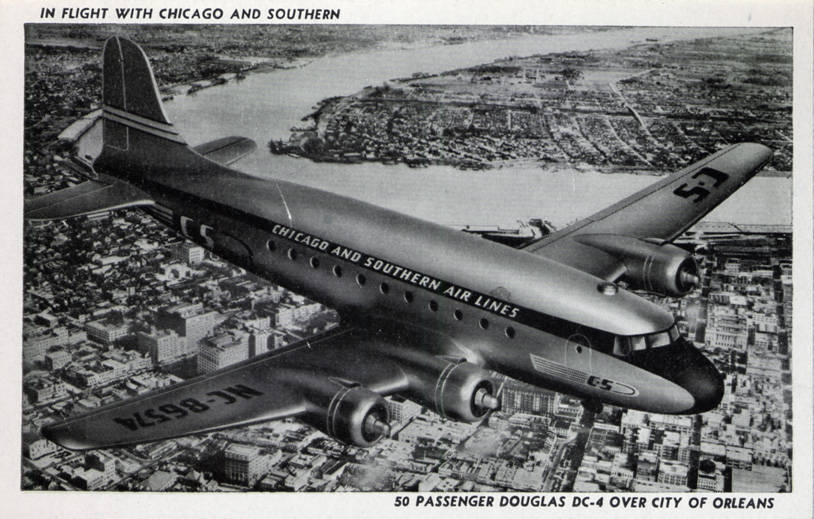
Postcard, 1946

From 1946, the DC-4s were used to commence international services from Houston and New Orleans to Havana, Cuba with Kingston, Jamaica and Caracas, Venezuela being added to C&S international route system by 1949. The February 1, 1947 Chicago & Southern system timetable route map includes all of these destinations as well as Aruba, Netherlands Antilles; Camaguey, Cuba; Curacao, Netherlands Antilles; Port au Prince, Haiti; Ciudad Trujillo, Dominican Republic (since renamed Santo Domingo); and San Juan, Puerto Rico; however, it appears that although passenger traffic rights may have been granted or applied for, these additional destinations were not served during the mid and late 1940s by C&S.

In October 1950 C&S took delivery of the first of five Lockheed L-649A Constellations. These larger pressurised airliners were placed in service from Chicago and St Louis to Houston, Memphis, New Orleans, Havana, Kingston, and Caracas.

On 10 January 1953 a new service from New Orleans to San Juan, Puerto Rico was inaugurated. According to the C&S timetable, this service was named the "Hai-Drico Rocket" and was operated once a week with a "New Luxury Constellation" on a southbound routing of Memphis - New Orleans - Port au Prince, Haiti - Ciudad Trujillo, Dominican Republic (now Santo Domingo) - San Juan with the return northbound flight continuing on from Memphis to St. Louis and Chicago.

=== Merger with Delta Air Lines ===
On 1 May 1953, C&S merged with Delta Air Lines, which provided Delta with access to a Great Lakes route system in the upper Midwest as well as additional destinations in the south central U.S. including for the first time Houston, Texas and, importantly, to points in the Caribbean Sea region as well as Venezuela thus providing Delta with its first international routes. The airline operated as Delta-C&S for the next two years.

== 1953 destinations ==
According to the April 1, 1953 Chicago & Southern Air Lines system timetable, the air carrier was serving the following domestic and international destinations shortly before it was acquired by and merged into Delta Air Lines:

=== Domestic ===
- Beaumont/Port Arthur, TX
- Chicago, IL - Midway Airport
- Detroit, MI
- Fort Wayne, IN
- El Dorado, AR
- Evansville, IN
- Greenwood, MS
- Hot Springs, AR
- Houston, TX - Hobby Airport
- Indianapolis, IN
- Jackson, MS
- Kansas City, MO
- Little Rock, AR
- Memphis, TN - Hub & airline headquarters
- New Orleans, LA
- Paducah, KY
- Pine Bluff, AR
- St. Louis, MO
- Shreveport, LA
- Springfield, MO
- Terre Haute, IN
- Toledo, OH

The airline also previously served Peoria, IL during the mid-1940s.

=== International ===
- Caracas, Venezuela
- Ciudad Trujillo, Dominican Republic (now Santo Domingo)
- Havana, Cuba
- Kingston, Jamaica
- Port au Prince, Haiti
- San Juan, Puerto Rico

Also in April 1953, Chicago & Southern was operating a "thru plane" service via an interchange agreement (see Transport hub) with Trans World Airlines (TWA) between Houston, Pittsburgh and New York City flown with Lockheed Constellation and Martin 4-0-4 "Skyliner" aircraft on two roundtrip routings including New York City - Pittsburgh - St. Louis - Houston and New York City - Pittsburgh - Indianapolis - Memphis - Shreveport - Houston.

== International service in 1950 ==
Aruba and Curacao in the Netherlands Antilles as well as Montego Bay, Jamaica all appeared on the Chicago & Southern route map contained in its system timetable dated October 1, 1950; however, this same timetable does not list any scheduled services operated by the airline into these destinations at this time. Chicago & Southern's international service at this same time was operated by a flight the airline called "The Caribbean Comet" with a Douglas DC-4 propliner flying a daily round trip routing of Chicago - St. Louis - Memphis - New Orleans - Havana - Kingston - Caracas.

== Fleet in 1950 ==
The October 1, 1950 Chicago & Southern system timetable lists three aircraft types being operated by the airline at this time:

- Douglas DC-3
- Douglas DC-4 "Skymaster'
- Lockheed Constellation (L-649A & L-749 models)

Prior to 1950, Chicago & Southern operated the following aircraft types:

- Bellanca CH-300 "Pacemaker"
- Curtiss K-6 Oriole
- Lockheed Model 10 Electra (model 10B)
- Stinson T SM-6000

== Legacy ==
Using the international route authority from New Orleans inherited from Chicago & Southern, Delta began flying one its first international jet services and in 1962 was operating then-new Convair 880 jetliners on a routing of San Francisco (SFO) - Dallas Love Field (DAL) - New Orleans (MSY) - Montego Bay, Jamaica (MBJ) - Caracas, Venezuela (CCS). Following its acquisition of Chicago & Southern in 1953, Delta operated former C&S Lockheed Constellation aircraft as well as "Super" Convair 340 propliners on its international flights to the Caribbean and Venezuela during the mid-1950s. By the late 1950s, Delta had replaced the Constellations and was operating Douglas DC-7 propliners on these routes in addition to the Convairs. The airline then introduced jet service with Convair 880 aircraft followed by Douglas DC-8 jetliners including stretched Douglas DC-8-61 (Super DC-8) aircraft on the Caribbean and Venezuela routes. According to the Official Airline Guide (OAG), by late 1979 Delta was operating wide body Lockheed L-1011 TriStar flights on a daily basis nonstop between New Orleans and San Juan, Puerto Rico.

Carlton Putnam remained on the Delta board of directors until his death in 1998. Following the C&S merger with Delta, he focused his attention on providing support for racial segregation.

== Incidents and accidents ==
- On August 5, 1936, Chicago and Southern Flight 4 crashed near St. Louis, Missouri. All 8 passengers and crew were killed in the accident.

== See also ==
- List of defunct airlines of the United States

== Bibliography ==
- Gradidge, J.M.G. (2006). The Douglas DC-3 - The First Seventy Years, Volume 1. Air-Britain (Historians) Ltd. ISBN 0-85130-332-3.
- Marson, Peter (1982). The Lockheed Constellation Series. Air-Britain (Historians) Ltd. ISBN 0-85130-100-2.
