= Huron, South Dakota =

City in the United States

- City
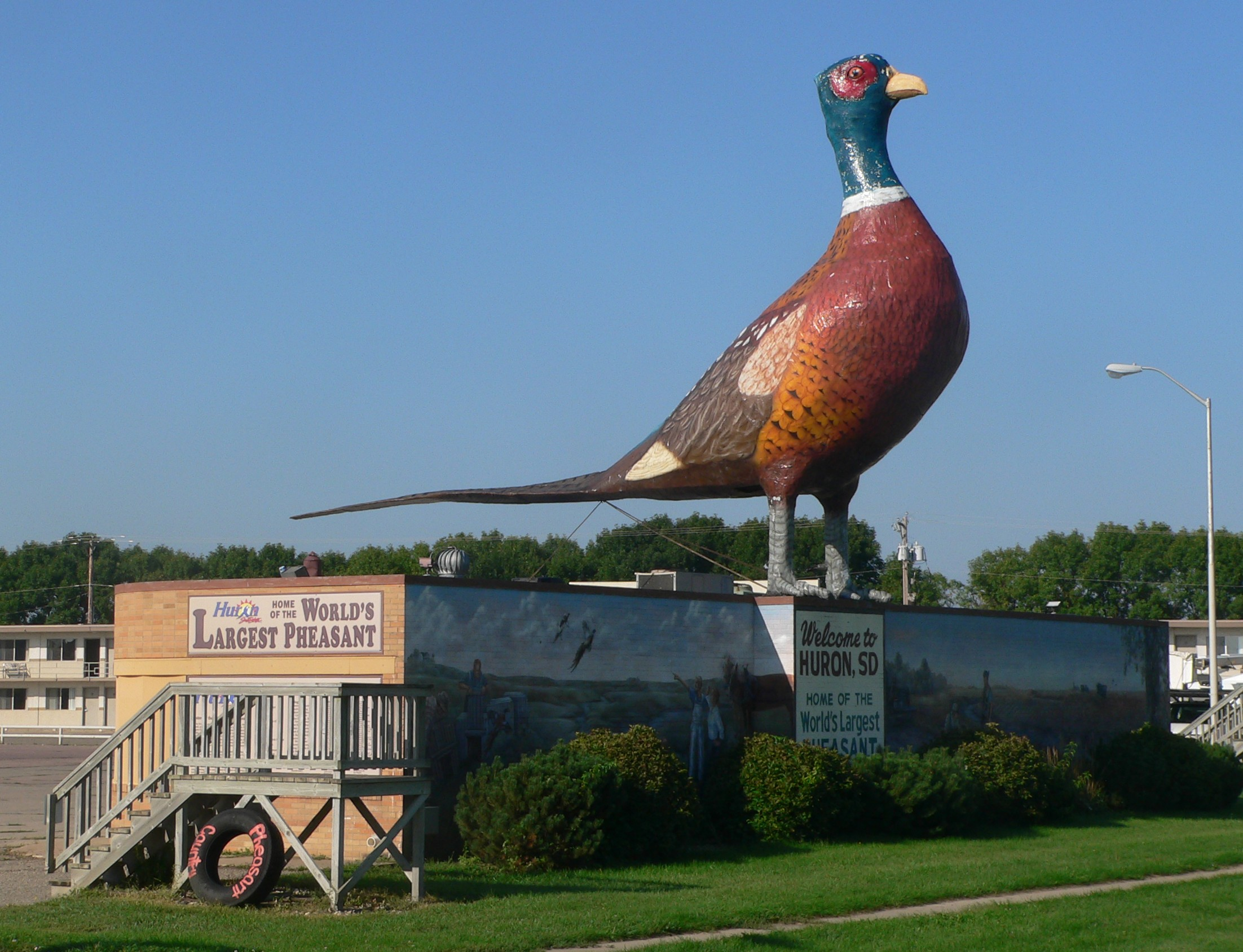
- World's Largest Pheasant in Huron

- Seal Logo
- Motto: "It's A Brand New Day!"
- Interactive map of Huron, South Dakota
- Coordinates: 44.362341°N 98.209571°W
- Country: United States
- State: South Dakota
- County: Beadle
- Founded: 1880
- Incorporated: March 8, 1883
- Named for: Huron Indians

Government
  - Type: Commissioner Form
  - Mayor: Mark Robish

Area
  - City: 10.934 sq mi (28.319 km^{2})
  - Land: 9.846 sq mi (25.500 km^{2})
  - Water: 1.088 sq mi (2.818 km^{2}) 9.95%
- Elevation: 1,280 ft (390 m)

Population (2020)
  - City: 14,263
  - Estimate (2024): 14,515
  - Density: 1,448.7/sq mi (559.33/km^{2})
  - Urban: 14,294
  - Metro: 19,459
- Time zone: UTC–6 (Central (CST))
  - Summer (DST): UTC–5 (CDT)
- ZIP Codes: 57350, 57399
- Area code: 605
- FIPS code: 46-31060
- GNIS feature ID: 1255722
- Highways: US 14, SD 37
- Website: huronsd.gov

Huron is a city in and the county seat of Beadle County, South Dakota, United States. The population was 14,263 at the 2020 census, and was estimated at 14,515 in 2024, making it the eighth-most populous city in South Dakota.

== History ==
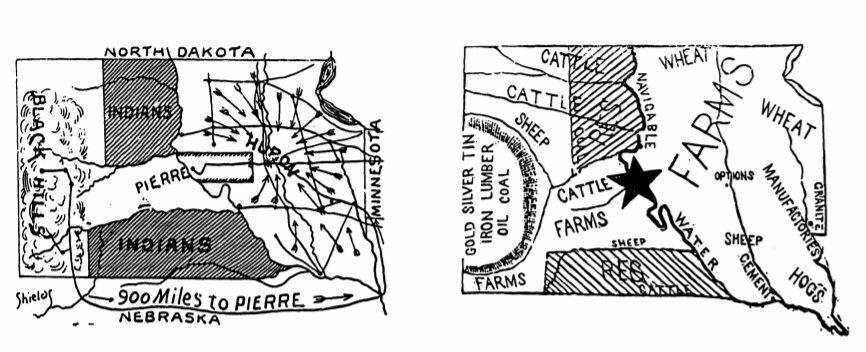
Huron (left) and Pierre (right) issued rival maps that claimed each as the best place voters should choose for the new state capital in 1890.

The first settlement at Huron was established in 1880. Huron is the site of the South Dakota State Fair and of a statue called the World's Largest Pheasant.

Huron was founded during railroad and land booms in the 1880s. The early history of the town is closely linked with the Chicago and Northwestern Railway. At the direction of Marvin Hughitt, general manager of the railroad, the west bank of the James River was selected as the railway's division headquarters. The company gained title to 880 acres (3.6 km^{2}) of land at that location. Huron was named for the Huron Indians.

The original plat covered 11 blocks, and Huron's first settler was John Cain, a practical printer from Troy, New York. He learned in Chicago, from the railroad people, that they would have their chief town and operating headquarters at their James River crossing.

Beginning in 1880, Huron and Pierre vied to be selected as the state capital, until Pierre was chosen in 1904. Campbell Park and Winter Park in Huron were previously designated as properties for the capital grounds, and a city block of land between the parks with Victorian houses was originally slated for the capitol building.

- Chronology:
  - 1879 – The town site was located
  - 1880 – Town site surveyed and platted
  - 1881 – First town government formed - a board of four trustees, a town clerk, a justice of the peace, one marshal and a surveyor
  - 1882 – Alderman system of government adopted
  - 1883 – Incorporated as the City of Huron - the city still operates under the original charter and seal
  - 1910 – Changed from alderman to city commission form of government
  - 1935 – City manager form of government adopted

== Geography ==
According to the United States Census Bureau, the city has a total area of 10.934 square miles (28.32 km^{2}), of which 9.846 square miles (25.50 km^{2}) is land and 1.088 square miles (2.82 km^{2}) (9.95%) is water.

=== Climate ===
Huron has a humid continental climate, with hot, humid summers, cold, dry winters, and wide temperature extremes; it is part of USDA hardiness zone 4b. The normal monthly mean temperature ranges from 16.0 °F (−8.9 °C) in January to 73.7 °F (23.2 °C) in July. On average, there are 1.7 days that reach 100 °F (38 °C) or higher, 21.9 days that reach 90 °F (32 °C) or higher, 66.7 days that do not climb above freezing, 27.7 days with a low of 0 °F (−18 °C) or below, and 3.1 days that do not rise above 0 °F (−18 °C) annually. The average window for freezing temperatures are September 30 through May 5, allowing a growing season of 147 days. Extreme temperatures officially range from −43 °F (−42 °C) on January 12, 1912, and January 8, 1887, up to 112 °F (44 °C) on July 10, 1966; the record cold daily maximum is −21 °F (−29 °C) on January 14, 1888, while, conversely, the record warm daily minimum is 82 °F (28 °C) on July 11, 1936.

Precipitation is greatest in May and June and averages 23.32 in (592 mm) annually, but has ranged from 9.72 in (247 mm) in 1952 to 30.89 in (785 mm) in 2010. Snowfall averages 44.4 in (113 cm) per season, and has historically ranged from 10.1 in (26 cm) in 1930–31 to 89.6 in (228 cm) in 2000–01; the average window for measurable (≥0.1 in or 0.25 cm) snowfall is November 3 through April 11, although snow in October occurs several times per decade and snow in May is a much rarer event.

Climate data for Huron Regional Airport, South Dakota, 1991−2020 normals, extremes 1881−present (Note: Official records for Huron kept at downtown from July 1881 to February 20, 1939 and at Huron Regional Airport since February 21, 1939.)
Month	Jan	Feb	Mar	Apr	May	Jun	Jul	Aug	Sep	Oct	Nov	Dec	Year
Record high °F (°C)	65 (18)	71 (22)	89 (32)	97 (36)	106 (41)	109 (43)	112 (44)	110 (43)	106 (41)	102 (39)	86 (30)	71 (22)	112 (44)
Mean daily maximum °F (°C)	25.8 (−3.4)	30.8 (−0.7)	43.7 (6.5)	57.9 (14.4)	70.0 (21.1)	80.0 (26.7)	85.7 (29.8)	83.4 (28.6)	75.7 (24.3)	60.2 (15.7)	43.9 (6.6)	30.2 (−1.0)	57.3 (14.1)
Daily mean °F (°C)	16.0 (−8.9)	20.5 (−6.4)	32.9 (0.5)	45.7 (7.6)	57.9 (14.4)	68.3 (20.2)	73.7 (23.2)	71.3 (21.8)	62.6 (17.0)	47.9 (8.8)	33.1 (0.6)	20.6 (−6.3)	45.9 (7.7)
Mean daily minimum °F (°C)	6.2 (−14.3)	10.2 (−12.1)	22.1 (−5.5)	33.6 (0.9)	45.9 (7.7)	56.7 (13.7)	61.6 (16.4)	59.2 (15.1)	49.5 (9.7)	35.5 (1.9)	22.2 (−5.4)	11.0 (−11.7)	34.5 (1.4)
Record low °F (°C)	−43 (−42)	−41 (−41)	−25 (−32)	−2 (−19)	16 (−9)	31 (−1)	37 (3)	33 (1)	18 (−8)	−6 (−21)	−28 (−33)	−34 (−37)	−43 (−42)
Average precipitation inches (mm)	0.58 (15)	0.75 (19)	1.15 (29)	2.52 (64)	3.15 (80)	3.89 (99)	2.83 (72)	2.59 (66)	2.43 (62)	1.95 (50)	0.82 (21)	0.66 (17)	23.32 (592)
Average snowfall inches (cm)	7.8 (20)	8.9 (23)	6.6 (17)	5.5 (14)	0.0 (0.0)	0.0 (0.0)	0.0 (0.0)	0.0 (0.0)	0.0 (0.0)	1.4 (3.6)	5.8 (15)	8.4 (21)	44.4 (113)
Average precipitation days (≥ 0.01 in)	6.3	7.0	7.0	9.0	11.2	11.6	8.8	8.0	6.8	7.4	5.4	6.4	94.9
Average snowy days (≥ 0.1 in)	6.1	6.4	4.1	2.2	0.0	0.0	0.0	0.0	0.0	0.9	3.3	6.0	29.0
Average relative humidity (%)	71.2	73.7	73.3	66.3	66.3	68.3	65.8	66.6	67.7	66.8	72.8	74.0	69.4
Mean monthly sunshine hours	179.7	182.8	229.9	251.7	307.0	332.8	362.4	329.3	258.9	215.9	152.1	144.1	2,946.6
Percentage possible sunshine	62	62	62	62	67	72	77	76	69	63	53	52	66
Source: NOAA (relative humidity and sun 1961–1990)

== Demographics ==
Historical population
Census	Pop.	Note	%±
1880	164		—
1890	3,038		1,752.4%
1900	2,793		−8.1%
1910	5,791		107.3%
1920	8,302		43.4%
1930	10,946		31.8%
1940	10,843		−0.9%
1950	12,788		17.9%
1960	14,180		10.9%
1970	14,299		0.8%
1980	13,000		−9.1%
1990	12,448		−4.2%
2000	11,893		−4.5%
2010	12,592		5.9%
2020	14,263		13.3%
2024 (est.)	14,515		1.8%
U.S. Decennial Census; 2020 Census

According to realtor website Zillow, the average price of a home as of October 31, 2025, in Huron is $170,752.

As of the 2023 American Community Survey, there are 5,534 estimated households in Huron with an average of 2.50 persons per household. The city has a median household income of $51,556. Approximately 16.4% of the city's population lives at or below the poverty line. Huron has an estimated 64.8% employment rate, with 27.0% of the population holding a bachelor's degree or higher and 81.9% holding a high school diploma. There were 6,196 housing units at an average density of 629.29 per square mile (243.0/km^{2}).

The top five reported languages (people were allowed to report up to two languages, thus the figures will generally add to more than 100%) were English (77.4%), Spanish (10.5%), Indo-European (1.1%), Asian and Pacific Islander (10.9%), and Other (0.2%).

The median age in the city was 34.6 years.

Huron, South Dakota – Racial and ethnic composition Note: the US Census treats Hispanic/Latino as an ethnic category. This table excludes Latinos from the racial categories and assigns them to a separate category. Hispanics/Latinos may be of any race.
Race / Ethnicity (NH = Non-Hispanic)	Pop 2000	Pop 2010	Pop 2020	% 2000	% 2010	% 2020
White alone (NH)	11,332	10,319	8,766	95.28%	81.95%	61.46%
Black or African American alone (NH)	114	106	126	0.96%	0.84%	0.88%
Native American or Alaska Native alone (NH)	143	136	210	1.20%	1.08%	1.47%
Asian alone (NH)	50	618	2,059	0.42%	4.91%	14.44%
Native Hawaiian or Pacific Islander alone (NH)	2	8	54	0.02%	0.06%	0.38%
Other race alone (NH)	3	5	27	0.03%	0.04%	0.19%
Mixed race or Multiracial (NH)	106	166	410	0.89%	1.32%	2.87%
Hispanic or Latino (any race)	143	1,234	2,611	1.20%	9.80%	18.31%
Total	11,893	12,592	14,263	100.00%	100.00%	100.00%

=== 2020 census ===
As of the 2020 census, there were 14,263 people, 5,524 households, and 3,299 families residing in the city. The population density was 1,467.54 inhabitants per square mile (566.6/km^{2}).

The median age was 34.9 years; 27.6% of residents were under the age of 18 and 17.1% of residents were 65 years of age or older. For every 100 females there were 99.3 males, and for every 100 females age 18 and over there were 97.7 males age 18 and over.

There were 5,524 households, of which 32.0% had children under the age of 18 living in them. Of all households, 42.8% were married-couple households, 21.7% were households with a male householder and no spouse or partner present, and 27.1% were households with a female householder and no spouse or partner present. About 34.7% of all households were made up of individuals and 15.0% had someone living alone who was 65 years of age or older.

There were 6,171 housing units at an average density of 634.94 per square mile (245.2/km^{2}), of which 10.5% were vacant. The homeowner vacancy rate was 2.2% and the rental vacancy rate was 14.0%.

99.4% of residents lived in urban areas, while 0.6% lived in rural areas.

Racial composition as of the 2020 census
Race	Number	Percent
White	9,221	64.6%
Black or African American	149	1.0%
American Indian and Alaska Native	292	2.0%
Asian	2,060	14.4%
Native Hawaiian and Other Pacific Islander	54	0.4%
Some other race	1,291	9.1%
Two or more races	1,196	8.4%
Hispanic or Latino (of any race)	2,611	18.3%

=== 2010 census ===
As of the 2010 census, there were 12,592 people, 5,418 households, and 3,179 families residing in the city. The population density was 1,328.3 inhabitants per square mile (512.9/km^{2}). There were 6,023 housing units at an average density of 635.3 per square mile (245.3/km^{2}). The racial makeup of the city was 86.86% White, 1.05% African American, 1.22% Native American, 4.91% Asian, 0.14% Pacific Islander, 3.94% from some other races and 1.90% from two or more races. Hispanic or Latino people of any race were 9.80% of the population.

There were 5,418 households, of which 28.7% had children under the age of 18 living with them, 44.4% were married couples living together, 9.8% had a female householder with no husband present, 4.4% had a male householder with no wife present, and 41.3% were non-families. 36.1% of all households were made up of individuals, and 15% had someone living alone who was 65 years of age or older. The average household size was 2.27 and the average family size was 2.94.

The median age in the city was 39.8 years. 24.1% of residents were under the age of 18; 8.7% were between the ages of 18 and 24; 22.8% were from 25 to 44; 26.4% were from 45 to 64; and 17.8% were 65 years of age or older. The gender makeup of the city was 49.4% male and 50.6% female.

=== 2000 census ===
As of the 2000 census, there were 11,893 people, 5,263 households, and 3,047 families residing in the city. The population density was 1,448.5 inhabitants per square mile (559.3/km^{2}). There were 5,872 housing units at an average density of 715.2 per square mile (276.1/km^{2}). The racial makeup of the city was 95.92% White, 0.96% African American, 1.29% Native American, 0.42% Asian, 0.03% Pacific Islander, 0.35% from some other races and 1.03% from two or more races. Hispanic or Latino people of any race were 1.20% of the population.

There were 5,263 households out of which 26.4% had children under the age of 18 living with them, 46.6% were married couples living together, 8.5% had a female householder with no husband present, and 42.1% were non-families. 37.3% of all households were made up of individuals and 16.8% had someone living alone who was 65 years of age or older. The average household size was 2.18 and the average family size was 2.86.

In the city the population was spread out with 23.3% under the age of 18, 9.2% from 18 to 24, 24.4% from 25 to 44, 22.0% from 45 to 64, and 21.0% who were 65 years of age or older. The median age was 40 years. For every 100 females there were 91.6 males. For every 100 females age 18 and over, there were 88.1 males.

The median income for a household in the city was $29,097, and the median income for a family was $40,234. Males had a median income of $27,027 versus $19,921 for females. The per capita income for the city was $18,275. About 8.1% of families and 12.4% of the population were below the poverty line, including 13.4% of those under age 18 and 13.1% of those age 65 or over.

== Arts and culture ==
The community operates a fine arts center and community theater.

In 2005, The Huron Event Center was opened, connecting an arena, hotel, and convention center.

The South Dakota State Fair is at the South Dakota State Fair Speedway.

== Parks and recreation ==
The city operates a waterpark called Splash Central, featuring an Olympic-sized pool, slides, and children's area.

== Government ==
The Huron government is "commissioner form". Under the commissioner form of government the board of commissioners consists of a mayor and four commissioners, who are all elected at large for three-year terms. The commission has control over all departments of the city and can make and enforce rules and regulations which it may see fit for the organization, management, and operation of the departments of the city. Responsibilities are divided into the following areas: Public Safety Commissioner, Public Works Commissioner, Utilities Commissioner, and Finance Commissioner with each commissioner having oversight in each respective area.

Huron has a federal building, field offices that is home to Social Security Administration, Western Area Power Administration, United States Fish and Wildlife Service, General Services Administration, Farm Service Agency and the USDA. Huron is also home to Area offices for state offices.

== Education ==
The Huron School District 02-2, which covers Huron, has three public elementary schools, one middle school, and one high school. Huron High School's mascot is the "Tigers". 2023-2024 enrollment was 2,935 students.

It was the home of Si Tanka University (formerly Huron College) from 1883 to 2005.

Huron is also home to a Catholic elementary school called Holy Trinity School, and a private non-denomination K-12 School, James Valley Christian School.

== Media ==
=== Newspaper ===
The Huron Daily Plainsman was the newspaper.

=== Television ===
KTTW operates a satellite station, operated by Tri-State Christian Television.

=== Radio ===
Radio stations include:

- 1210 AM - KOKK (country music)
- 1340 AM - KIJV (adult contemporary music)
- 88.7 FM - KVCH (Christian radio)
- 88.7 FM - K213CL (National Public Radio)
- 93.3 FM - KJRV (classic rock)
- 95.3 FM - K237EL (adult contemporary music)

== Infrastructure ==
=== Transportation ===
U.S. Route 14 is an east–west route passing through the northern part of the city. It intersects with north–south South Dakota Highway 37 in the city. This was the historical designation of the north–south U.S. Route 281, which was later moved to a more direct route that passes approximately ten miles west of Huron.

The Rapid City, Pierre and Eastern Railroad runs east–west, with maintenance facilities and a working roundhouse in the city.

The Huron Regional Airport is city-owned. It had scheduled passenger flights operated by a commuter air carrier, Great Lakes Airlines, with Beechcraft 1900D commuter turboprop aircraft service to Denver. The airport does not currently have any scheduled service.

People's Transit provides demand-response transit in and around Huron, and also provides a connection to Jefferson Lines intercity buses at Mitchell.

== Notable people ==
- Adolphus W. Burtt, South Dakota Attorney General
- Earl Caddock, professional wrestler
- J. L. Carr, English novelist, taught at the public school in Huron in 1938–1939 and 1956–1957
- Roxanne Conlin, Iowan politician, ran for senator in 2010
- Patrick Davis, Republican political consultant and former director of the National Republican Senatorial Committee.
- John K. Fairbank, historian of China, was born in Huron in 1907
- Archibald K. Gardner, former federal judge
- Bob Glanzer, former member of the South Dakota House of Representatives
- Josh Haeder, 33rd State Treasurer of South Dakota
- Candace Hilligoss, actress
- Muriel Humphrey, U.S. Senator from Minnesota in 1978 and wife of Hubert Humphrey
- Raymond A. Johnson, aviation pioneer
- Amit Kapur, former Chief operating officer of MySpace
- Craig Kennedy, member of the South Dakota Senate
- Cheryl Ladd, actress and singer
- Vernon C. Miller, Beadle County Sheriff turned Prohibition criminal
- Arthur L. Padrutt, Wisconsin politician
- John M. Patton, member of the Minnesota Senate and funeral director
- Gladys Pyle, first woman elected to the U.S. Senate without having previously been appointed
- John L. Pyle, former Attorney General of South Dakota
- Mamie Shields Pyle, women's suffrage advocate
- Mike Rounds, South Dakota governor and U.S. senator
- Chic Sale, actor and vaudevillian, born in Huron
- Ron Tschetter, Director of the Peace Corps
- Fred M. Wilcox, former South Dakota state senator

== See also ==
- USS Huron, at least 2 ships
