= Fred M. Wilcox (South Dakota politician) =

American politician

Fred M. Wilcox (1858–1938) was an American politician and businessman.

Born 15 September 1858 in Fremont County, Iowa, Wilcox moved to Springfield, Illinois, and then in 1880, to Beadle County, Dakota Territory. Wilcox was in the real estate and loan business and lived in Huron, South Dakota. He married Adda M. Miller (1857–1949), with whom he had a son and a daughter. Between 1900 and 1910, they moved to Pasadena, California. Wilcox died on December 1, 1938, and he and his wife are interred in Glendale, California.

== Political career ==
Wilcox served in the South Dakota State Senate in 1903 and 1904 as a Republican.
