= Patrick Davis (politics) =

American political consultant

Patrick Davis is a political consultant and strategist. Davis has worked in the George H. W. Bush Administration and the National Republican Senatorial Committee, most notably as Political Director in 2004. Davis also served as the Executive Director of the South Dakota Republican Party before going into private business in 2005. He lives in Colorado Springs, Colorado, with his wife, Jo Ann, and their two children.

== Life in the public sphere ==
After graduating from college in 1990, Davis served as the Assistant to the Deputy Director of White House Political Affairs in the George H. W. Bush Administration. Davis then worked for the 1992 Bush-Quayle Presidential campaign, serving as the field desk coordinator for eleven Northwestern states.

Davis served as the Executive Director of the South Dakota Republican Party from 1995 to 1999. During this time, South Dakota Republicans increased their majorities in both houses of the State Legislature, John Thune was elected to the United States House of Representatives and Governor Bill Janklow was re-elected.

In 1999, Davis was hired to represent the National Republican Senatorial Committee as a Regional Political Director in ten Republican United States Senate campaigns. During the 2004 election cycle, Davis served as the NRSC's Political Director, increasing the Republican majority from 51 to 55. In his position as Political Director, Davis managed the political and strategic operations of the committee, including candidate recruitment, message development, and campaign management. He also directed the committee's $35 million voter contact budget.

Davis was involved in the competitive winning United States Senate campaigns for John Thune, Norm Coleman, Wayne Allard, Gordon Smith, Conrad Burns, Tom Coburn, Mel Martinez, Richard Burr, David Vitter, Jim Bunning, Johnny Isakson, Mike Lee, Richard Burr, John Hoeven, and Jim DeMint.

Davis was involved in the competitive winning United States Representative campaigns for Cynthia Lummis, Rick Berg, Steve Daines, Kristi Noem, Tim Huelskamp, and Mike Coffman.

== Private consultant ==
In 2005, Davis founded Patrick Davis Consulting, LLC, a company that serves candidates, campaigns and corporations clients. Patrick Davis Consulting has been hired to work for both local and national campaigns, including Steve House for Governor (CO), Joe Gschwendtner for Governor (CO), Steve Laffey for Congress (CO), Floyd Trujillo for U.S. Senate (CO), Ron Saxton for Governor (OR), Don Stenberg for U.S. Senate (NE), Mike Protack for U.S. Senate (DE), Scott Tipton for Congress (CO-3), Jeff Crank for Congress (CO-5), Duane Sand for Congress (ND), Bruce Whalen for Congress (SD), Rick O'Donnell for Congress (CO-7), Kyle Hybl for CU Regent (CO-5), Eli Schwiesow for State Senate (SD), Glen Urquhart for Congress (DE), Karen England for Lt. Governor (CA), Rhonda Sivarajah for Congress (MN), Sharna Wahlgren for Congress (MN), David Gerson for Congress (MN) and Dan Lederman for Senate (SD)

Since 1990, Davis has been involved in the winning U.S. Senate campaigns for John Thune, John Hoeven, Larry Pressler ('90), Steve Daines, Dan Sullivan, Lisa Murkowski, Jim DeMint, Joni Ernst, Cory Gardner, Thom Tillis, Bill Cassidy, Mike Lee, Norm Coleman, Rudy Boschwitz ('90), Tom Cotton, Bill Frist, Wayne Allard, Gordon Smith, Conrad Burns, Tom Coburn, Mel Martinez, Richard Burr, Jim Inhofe, John Cornyn, Sam Brownback, David Vitter, Jim Bunning, and Johnny Isakson.

He has been involved in the winning US House campaigns of Kristi Noem, Kevin Cramer, Tim Huelskamp, Mike Coffman, Steve Pearce, and Cynthia Lummis.

Finally, Patrick Davis Consulting also provides public relations services for private, non-political clients, such as Wal-Mart, Comcast, Neumann Education Foundation, and Neumann Systems Group.

== Notes ==
www.PatrickDavisConsulting.com
