= Inland Air Lines =

US airline that merged into Western 1930–1952

Inland Air Lines Wyoming Air Service
- Founded: 1930; 96 years ago as Wyoming Air Service
- Ceased operations: April 9, 1952; 73 years ago merged into Western Air Lines
- Parent company: Western Air Lines (1944–1952)
- Headquarters: Casper, Wyoming until 1944; Los Angeles from 1944
- Key people: Richard Leferink

Inland Air Lines was a small trunk carrier, a scheduled United States airline which started as Wyoming Air Service (WAS), founded by Richard Leferink in May 1930, initially as a flying school. In the mid-1930s WAS won airmail contracts for routes in Wyoming, Nebraska, South Dakota and Montana. WAS changed its name to Inland Air Lines on 1 July 1938.

Pursuant to the Civil Aeronautics Act of 1938, the Civil Aeronautics Authority (CAA) of the United States certificated Inland as a United States scheduled airline on March 28, 1939. Thereafter, the Civil Aeronautics Board (CAB), which succeeded the CAA in 1940, regulated Inland as a trunk carrier.

In 1944, the CAB approved the purchase of Inland by Western Air Lines. However, although Western controlled the overwhelming majority of Inland's stock, as a Wyoming corporation, Inland could not be merged into Western without the unanimous consent of its shareholders, and a few shareholders continued to hold out. Therefore, Inland continued to exist as a separate subsidiary of Western until 1952, when Wyoming law changed, the CAB gave final approval and Western was finally able to merge Inland into itself.

Inland styled itself as "The Wings Over The West." In 1948, Inland accounted for less than a half percent of total trunk airline Revenue-Passenger Miles, the smallest trunk airline by that measure. And as of December 1949, it operated only a single DC-3.

== See also ==
- List of defunct airlines of the United States
- Western Airlines
