= Mid-Continent Airlines =

US trunk carrier (1928–1952) merged into Braniff

| IATA | ICAO | Call sign |
|---|---|---|
| — | — | MID-CONTINENT |
- Founded: 1928 (as Hanford's Tri-State Airlines); Sioux City, Iowa, United States
- Commenced operations: 1938 (as Mid-Continent Airlines)
- Ceased operations: August 16, 1952 (merged into Braniff Airways, Incorporated)
- Hubs: Kansas City International Airport; Minneapolis-St. Paul Wold-Chamberlain International Airport
- Secondary hubs: Tulsa International Airport; Des Moines International Airport; St. Louis Lambert International Airport
- Focus cities: Sioux City Municipal Airport; Houston William P. Hobby Airport; Louis Armstrong New Orleans International Airport Moisant Field; Shreveport Municipal Airport
- Headquarters: Sioux City, Iowa 1928 to 1936; Kansas City, Missouri 1936 to 1952
- Key people: Arthur S. Hanford Sr. Arthur S. Hanford Jr. Thomas Fortune Ryan III; James Wescott "Bill" Miller; Richard B. Cass

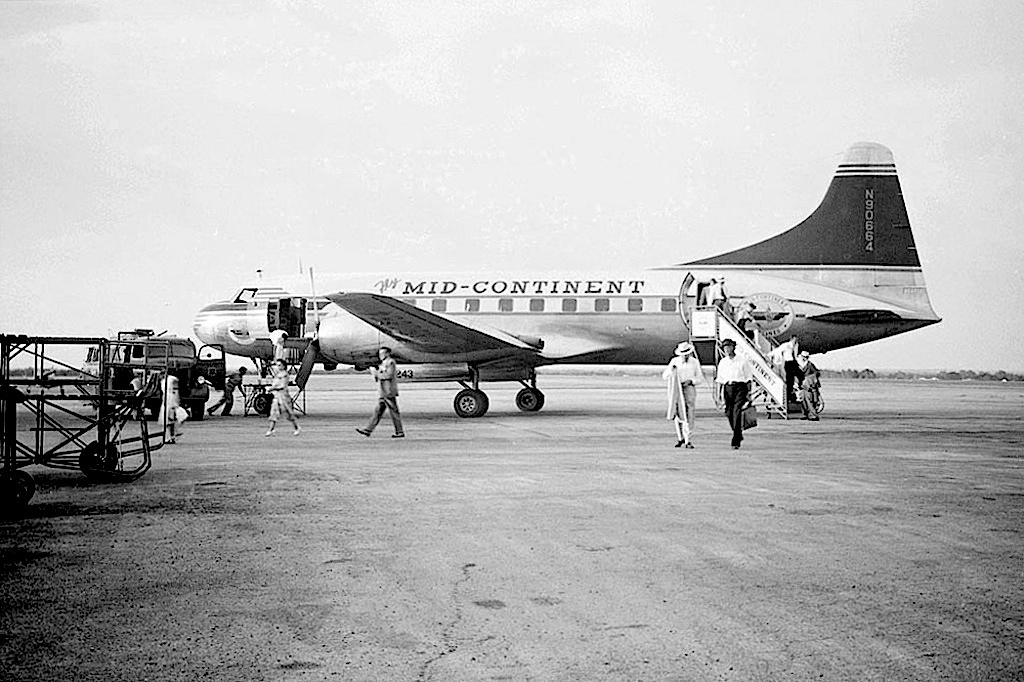
Convair 240 Tulsa 1950

Mid-Continent Airlines was a trunk carrier, a scheduled airline which operated in the central United States from the 1930s until 1952 when it was acquired by and merged with Braniff International Airways. Mid-Continent Airlines was originally founded as a flight school at Rickenbacker Airport in Sioux City, Iowa, during 1928, by Arthur Hanford Jr., a dairy operator. The Hanford Produce Company was the largest creamery in the United States with over 100 trucks in operation. The company was primarily a dairy but also sold ice cream and poultry. The Hanford's also founded and built the new Rickenbacker Airport and operated eight gas stations and several service repair garages under the name Hanford's, Inc. The airport was a division of Hanford's, Inc., but the service stations and garages were later sold to finance airline operations. Mid-Continent was based in Kansas City, Missouri at the time of its acquisition by Braniff.

== History ==
=== Hanford's Tri-State Airlines ===
The company was founded in 1928 at Rickenbacker Airport in Sioux City, Iowa, as a small flight school by Arthur S. Hanford Sr and his son Arthur S. Hanford Jr. Soon the company became known as Hanford's Tri-State Airlines, which offered charter service and scheduled flights from Sioux City to Omaha, Nebraska, Minneapolis, Minnesota and Bismarck, North Dakota.

The fleet consisted of Stearmans, American Eagles, Ryans, Travel Airs, Eagle Rocks and one Sikorsky amphibian, which was used for operations in the Northern lake country.

In 1934 it was awarded Air Mail Route 16 for runs from Chicago to Winnipeg, Manitoba, Canada. Intermediate routings included Milwaukee, Madison, Wisconsin; Rochester, St. Paul, Minneapolis, Minnesota; Fargo, Grand Forks and Pembina, North Dakota, and finally Winnipeg, Manitoba, Canada. The company was also awarded Air Mail Route 26 from Minneapolis to Kansas City with intermediate stops at Sioux Falls, Sioux City and Omaha, and finally between Sioux Falls and Bismarck/Mandan with enroute stops at Huron and Aberdeen. Service began over Route 16 in June 1934 and over Route 26 in July 1934.

At this time, the company moved its headquarters to Minneapolis. However, when the Chicago to Winnipeg route was sold in December 1934 to Northwest Airlines, general offices were moved back to Sioux City. Its fleet included four four-passenger Lockheed Vegas and three Ford Tri-Motors. Route 26 required three-engine equipment, which Hanford's did not initially have and therefore, leased the route to Rapid Air Lines for a brief period from June 1, 1934 until December 1, of the same year. The two carriers had merged in 1933 to form Hanford-Rapid Airlines but were operated as separate entities.

=== New Management ===
On June 23, 1935, Hanford's founder Arthur Hanford Jr. was killed in a tragic plane crash while on a training mission. His father, Arthur Sr., assumed the Presidency and then searched for someone to operate the airline that had a solid vision to ensure the fledgling airline's future. He found Thomas Fortune Ryan III of Lockheed Aircraft, who Mr. Hanford had met while buying aircraft at Lockheed for his airline.

The airline was acquired in May 1936 by Thomas Fortune Ryan III, the grandchild of financier and industrial pioneer Thomas Fortune Ryan. The same year, Ryan moved the headquarters to Kansas City and Arthur S. Hanford Sr., was elected president of the new company and J. W. Bill Miller joined the company as vice president and general manager. At the time of the change in ownership, Hanford's employed 64 people, served nine cities and held route certificates that totaled 838 miles. The Ryan's only purchased six of Hanford's aircraft including two Ford Trimotors and four 4-passenger single-engine Lockheed Vegas.

The new Hanford-Rapid Airlines moved to Fairfax Airport at Kansas City, Missouri. Here the company moved into the building that was once occupied by United Airlines. Mr. Ryan III also moved to Kansas City and became the airline's Executive Vice President. The new management began replacing aging equipment, strengthening the existing organization and began a comprehensive study of possible expansion opportunities was implemented almost immediately.

Hanford-Rapid Airlines served the following cities: Minneapolis/St. Paul, Minnesota; Bismarck/Mandan, North Dakota; Aberdeen, South Dakota; Huron, South Dakota; Sioux Falls, South Dakota; Sioux City, Iowa; Omaha, Nebraska and Kansas City, Missouri. At the time of purchase, the airline flew one daily round trip between Minneapolis/St. Paul and Bismarck/Mandan with intermediate stops at Sioux Falls, Sioux City, Huron and Aberdeen. One daily round trip was also flown between Omaha and Kansas City.

As a result of the purchase of Hanford's Tri-State Airlines by the Ryan's, Mid-Continent Airlines was incorporated under the laws of the State of Delaware on May 6, 1936. The company officially began air carrier operations on July 1, 1936, under the corporate name of Hanford Airlines, Inc. The purchase of Hanford Airlines assets included its air mail contract and the liabilities associated with that contract in addition to the Ford Trimotor and Lockheed Vega airliners.

=== Lockheed Electra L-10 Airliner Joins the Fleet ===
One of the first moves of the new Ryan led management was the introduction of the new Lockheed L-10 Electra twin-engine airliner. Luxurious seating for ten passengers made this aircraft popular among passengers at the time. On July 10, 1936, the new aircraft was pressed into service amidst colorful ceremonies for the newly dubbed "The Sioux Chief" airliner. Mr. Ryan led a contingent of VIPs and airliner management on the inaugural flight from Kansas City to Minneapolis/St. Paul Wold-Chamberlain Airport. Guest passengers included Mr. Eddie Rickenbacker, Mr. W. N. DeWald, Operations Manager, Mr. J. W. Bill Miller, Vice President and General Manager and Mr. Justin Bowersock, Aviation Editor of The Kansas City Star Newspaper along with other members of the press.

The new Electra was already an industry star. Just before Mid-Continent introduction of L-10 service, the famed James Harold "Jimmy" Doolittle established an all-time speed record for a passenger airliner flying between Chicago and New Orleans.

=== Expansion Southbound ===
On August 30, 1936, Hanford inaugurated new air mail, express and passenger service between Kansas City and Tulsa, Oklahoma. Hanford began the tradition of inviting a Native American Chief to fly on its inaugural flights. Chief Crazy Bull, a Sioux Native from the Rosebud Reservation in North Dakota, was a VIP on the first flight, which was christened in Kansas City by Miss Loraine Norquist, daughter of Mr. E. E. Norquist. Also on board was Mr. Alexander W. Graham, Mr. Homer Bredow, Chairman of the Aviation Committee of the Kansas City Chamber of Commerce; Colonel Ruby D. Garrett; Mr. Clarence R. Mooney, Public Relations Director of the Kansas City Chamber; Mr. Thomas R. Ryan III; Mr. J. W. Bill Miller; Mr. W. N. DeWald, Operations Manager at Hanford and Mr. Malcolm L. Boss, Traffic Manager.

The flight was flown by Captain A. J. "Al" Jaster. Captain Jaster continued on with Mid-Continent Airlines and ultimately retired from Braniff Airways, Inc. He had flown over 3 million miles during his career with Hanford and Mid-Continent.

During this time, Hanford became the first US airline to operate scheduled flights over unlighted airways. The Airline used the new onboard direction finding equipment to navigate without lighter ground navigation aids over its Kansas City to Tulsa route.

=== Mid-Continent Airlines ===
The company was renamed Mid-Continent Airlines in 1938 after expanding service into the oil boom cities in the Mid-continent Oil Field out of a hub in Tulsa, Oklahoma. Company management felt that the new name would better identify it with the Midwest region that it served.

On December 11, 1939, Mr. Ryan was elected President of the company and Mr. Hanford Sr., became the Chairman of the Board of Directors. He retained that position until his death in the fall of 1941.

In 1940, Mid-Continent doubled its route miles and personnel with it was awarded a certificate to operate a new route between Minneapolis and St. Louis, with intermediate stops at Rochester, Minnesota; Des Moines and Ottumwa and between Des Moines and Kansas City. An additional route was awarded between Bismarck and Minot, North Dakota.

As was fashionable for the era, Mid-Continent named its routes of flight as follows :

The Kansas Citian - Minneapolis/St. Paul - Sioux City - Omaha - Kansas City - operated with Lockheed L-10 Electra airliners

The Missourian - Minneapolis/St. Paul - Rochester - Des Moines - Ottumwa - St. Louis - operated with Lockheed Lodestar airliners

The Corn Husker : Minneapolis/St. Paul - Watertown - Huron - Sioux City - Sioux-Falls - Omaha - Kansas City - operated with Lockheed Lodestar airliners

The Dakotan : Minneapolis/St. Paul - Sioux Falls - Huron - Aberdeen - Bismarck/Mandan - Minot - operated with Lockheed L-10 Electra airliners

That same year, the Lockheed Lodestar airliner was added to the fleet, which seated 14-passengers in comfort. The Lodestar was the fastest commercial plane in service at the time.

The company flew 6 million revenue passenger miles that year; Braniff had 36 million and industry leader American had 312 million. After World War II Mid-Continent expanded to Shreveport, Louisiana, New Orleans and Houston.

=== Chief Wapello ===
Mid-Continent adopted a unique corporate logo that honored Native Americans and their Chiefs. Specifically, MCA selected the famed Chief Wapello as their company mascot and logo, which featured either the Chief's face or his full upper body with arms and hands drawing a bow and arrow.

The Great Chief Wapello commanded the Meskwaki Tribe, which was also known as the Fox Tribe. The Tribe migrated from what is today Ontario, Canada, to what is today, Michigan, Wisconsin, Illinois and Iowa, which covered a large section of Mid-Continent's service area. The Chief was known for his ability to work with white settlers and avoid conflict.

=== Wartime Service ===
In 1941, Thomas F. Ryan III became president of Mid-Continent Airlines. He served as president until he joined the United States Army March 6, 1942. At that time, J. W. Bill Miller was elected President and General Manager, which he held until the merger with Braniff Airways in 1952.

From May 1942 to September 1944, Mid-Continent flew a cargo route for the Army Air Transport Command, which carried nearly 17,000 pounds of critical war materials. The Airline also operated scheduled passenger services with a greatly reduced fleet and it also trained Army pilots and mechanics and modified military aircraft. The company modified the famed B-25s that General Jimmy Doolittle used to bomb Tokyo.

By June 1942, the company had remanded 70 percent of its fleet to the US Military. However, by 1943, the fleet had been restored to 50 percent of its pre-war count.

=== From Lodestars to DC-3s ===
In January 1945, Mid-Continent began replacing its Lockheed Lodestars with luxurious 21-passenger twin-engine Douglas DC-3 airliners. This revolutionary new airliner increased the company's available space by 223 percent and enabled it to significantly increase its schedule.

During this period, the company had improved its maintenance procedures to an unprecedented level. As a result, this improvement enabled the Airline to operate 85 percent of its pre-war scheduled mileage by late 1943 and by the end of 1944, it had surpassed its 1941 full fleet scheduled mileage all despite its reduction in fleet size by 50-percent.

=== Down to the Gulf Coast ===
In August 1945, Mid-Continent inaugurated new extension service from Tulsa to New Orleans, Louisiana, with intermediate stops at Fort Smith, Arkansas; Texarkana, Arkansas/Texas and Shreveport, Louisiana. Seven months later in March 1946, the company began stopping at Mason City, Iowa, on its Des Moines to Minneapolis route and in July 1945, service was added at Muskogee, Oklahoma, on the Tulsa to New Orleans flights. During wartime service, the company had discontinued service at Aberdeen, Bismarck/Mandan and Minot as well as St. Joseph, Missouri. In September 1946, all service was restored to these destinations.

Colonel Thomas F. Ryan III returned from military service in February 1946 after having served as Staff Officer under General Douglas MacArthur in the Pacific. At this time, Mr. Ryan was elected Chairman of the Board of Directors of Mid-Continent Airlines.

In February 1947, service was extended from Tulsa to Houston, Texas, with an intermediate stop at Tyler, Texas, and a month later service was inaugurated between Sioux City and Des Moines on April 15, 1947. On July 15, 1947, Mid-Continent inaugurated service at Longview/Kilgore/Gladewater, Texas, on its Tulsa to Houston flights. In addition, service to Ottumwa, Iowa, which had been suspended during wartime, was reinstated.

=== Air Cargo Service Inaugurated ===
On January 1, 1947, Mid-Continent rang in the new year with the inauguration of air cargo service over its route system.

=== New Service and Growth Expansion ===
In 1948, the Airline inaugurated service at Quincy, Illinois and Waterloo, Iowa. Also, in January 1948, the company also inaugurated new service between Kansas City and St. Louis, Missouri.

On May 5, 1949, the Airline's board of directors approved a measure for an agreement for the purchase of St. Louis-based Parks Airlines, Inc., which was planned to become a wholly owned subsidiary of Mid-Continent. The entire plan, of course, required Civil Aeronautics Board approval. The purchase agreement called for the exchange of stock rather than cash payments. Ultimately, the CAB did not approve the merger on August 1, 1950.

However, the CAB did award all of the routes in the North Central Route Investigation Case to Mid-Continent but with certain restrictions. Service began between Sioux City and Chicago and Rockford and Milwaukee on September 26, 1950, which was the day the new award became effective. The cities of Sioux City, Waterloo, Dubuque, Rockford, Chicago and Milwaukee all received two flights daily, while a third roundtrip was added between Waterloo and Chicago on December 1, 1950.

Several merger prospects were in the works for Mid-Continent during the 1940s. Northwest Airlines and American Airlines proposed mergers with the airline in the 1940s but they were not approved.

During 1949, Mid-Continent's modern fleet of fine airliners flew over 105 million passenger miles. In comparison, Hanford Airlines flew 1 million passenger miles in 1936. Mid-Continent's Revenue Passengers flown totaled 340,636, in 1949, compared to 5,214 during 1936. The company completed 92.6 percent of its scheduled flights in 1942 but by 1944 that had increased to 96.68 and in 1949 an impressive 97.73 percent were completed. Since the first Hanford flight in 1928 and for the next 15 year, the combined companies flew 473 million passenger miles flown, without a single passenger or crew fatality. In October 1951, the company flew to 34 airports.

=== The Convair 240 Enters Service ===
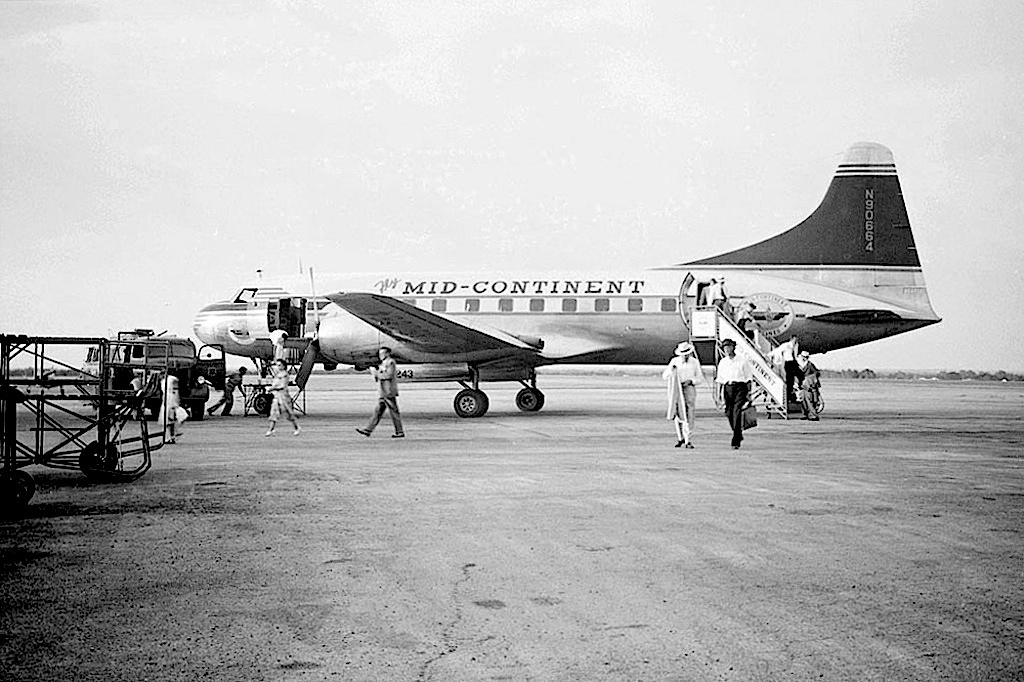
Mid-Continent Convair 240 at Tulsa International Airport (August 1950).

On February 16, 1950, the airline's board of directors approved the purchase of four 40-passenger twin-engine Convair 240 airliners and related equipment at a cost of over $2 million. The aircraft, previously owned by Pan American World Airways Systems, featured a comfortable pressurized cabin and cruise at a speed of 300 miles per hour.

Less than for months later on June 1, 1950, the new luxury airliners went into service between Minneapolis/St. Paul and Kansas City with intermediate stops at Sioux Falls, Sioux City and Omaha. In addition, the new Convair began service between the Twin Cities and Rochester and Des Moines and Kansas City and finally, and from Kansas City south to Houston via Tulsa.

=== New Minneapolis/St. Paul Maintenance Center ===
New maintenance facilities were announced on October 1, 1950. A spacious new hangar would be built at Minneapolis/St. Paul's Wold-Chamberlin Airport. The new facility would double the space it currently occupied at MSP and could accommodate the carrier's new Convairliners. The cost of the new facility was US$375,000, with construction beginning in December 1950 and only seven months later, the company took possession of the new hangar in July 1951.

=== Kansas City Airport ===
After the Great Flood of 1951, Kansas City, Missouri moved to build a new airport away from the river for Mid-Continent and TWA, whose main overhaul base was located in a former B-25 bomber factory at Fairfax Airport. The new airport was to be called Mid-Continent Airport to honor the roots of Mid-Continent Airlines. This airport would eventually become Kansas City International Airport.

=== New Fleet Additions and Improvements ===
On June 11, 1951, Mid-Continent ordered six new Convair 340 twin-engine 46-passenger luxury aircraft from Consolidated-Vultee Aircraft Company of San Diego, California. The aircraft were scheduled for delivery beginning in 1953 and the order was taken up by Braniff Airways, which was the first airline to put the model in service on November 1, 1952.

Also during 1953, the DC-3 fleet was increased by four and a fleet modernization program was commenced. The upgrade program included the installation new integral steps to the entry doors and increased passenger capacity from 21 to 24 passengers.

=== Merger with Braniff Airways ===
Before the airport opened, Mid-Continent Airlines was acquired by Braniff International Airways on August 16, 1952. According to Braniff Airways corporate files housed at Braniff Airways Foundation in Dallas, Texas, the merger between Mid-Continent and Braniff was first reviewed in 1940.

At the time of the merger, Mid-Continent featured a strong route system throughout the central Midwest of the United States stretching from as far north as Minot, North Dakota, and as far south as New Orleans, Louisiana. The short-haul route system complimented the Braniff Airways network and added what became Braniff strongholds such as Minneapolis/St. Paul, Sioux City, Sioux Falls, Omaha, Kansas City, Des Moines, St. Louis, Shreveport and New Orleans.

Oklahoma service would now include McAlester and Muskogee with Paris added in Texas, connecting Tyler and Houston. The merger gave Braniff more of a presence east of a Tulsa, Oklahoma City and Dallas line whereas Braniff was prevalent on the western side of that line. The presence switched north of Kansas City with Braniff more predominant on the east side of a Kansas City to Chicago line and Mid-Continent the predominant carrier on the Western side. The amalgamation of the two carrier's created a solid north and south flow to feed Braniff's Latin American route system.

Braniff began official negotiations with Mid-Continent on January 16, 1952, when a letter of application was filed with the CAB for the merger on January 24, 1952. However, Braniff had been studying a possible merger with Mid-Continent since 1940. The Civil Aeronautics Board approved the merger on May 26, 1952, with an effective date of August 16, 1952. Mid-Continent Chairman Thomas Ryan and President J. W. Miller became officers of Braniff Airways, Inc., at that time.

On August 16, 1952, Mid Continent Airlines operated over 6200 route miles to 35 cities in the Midwest United States. The fleet consisted of 23 Douglas DC-3 aircraft, four Convair 240 aircraft as well as six Convair 340's that were on order.

=== Interchange with Eastern Airlines ===
By 1952, Mid-Continent had entered into a "through plane" interchange agreement with Eastern Air Lines which enabled single plane service between Kansas City and Miami, Florida, via intermediate stops in St. Louis, Atlanta, Georgia and Jacksonville, Florida.

=== Celebrates 90th Anniversary ===
Mid-Continent Airlines celebrated its 90th anniversary during 2018. This anniversary coincided with the 90th Anniversary Celebration of Braniff Airways, which also began service during the same year on June 20.

== Fleet in 1952 ==
When they merged on August 16, 1952, Mid-Continent had a fleet of Douglas DC-3s as well as five Convairliners including Convair 240 and Convair 340 aircraft. The DC-3s were operated for several more years while the Convair 240s were retired during 1953. The new Convairs continued flying for Braniff Airways until the mid-1960s. The airline had six Convair 340s on order at the time of the merger.

== Destinations in 1951 ==
By the early 1950s, the airline's route system stretched from Minnesota and North Dakota in the north central U.S. to the Gulf Coast in Louisiana and Texas. According to its September 1, 1951, system timetable, Mid-Continent was serving the following destinations:

United States

Arkansas

- Fort Smith, Arkansas
- Texarkana, Arkansas Texas/Arkansas

Illinois

- Chicago, Illinois
- Quincy, Illinois
- Rockford, Illinois

Iowa

- Des Moines, Iowa
- Dubuque, Iowa
- Mason City, Iowa
- Ottumwa, Iowa
- Sioux City, Iowa original headquarters
- Waterloo, Iowa

Louisiana

- New Orleans, Louisiana
- Shreveport, Louisiana

Minnesota

- Minneapolis/St. Paul, Minnesota - Hub

Missouri

- Joplin, Missouri
- Jefferson City, Missouri served prior to 1951
- Kansas City, Missouri Hub & airline headquarters\
- Rochester, Minnesota
- St. Joseph, Missouri
- St. Louis, Missouri

Nebraska

- Lincoln, Nebraska
- Omaha, Nebraska

North Dakota

- Bismarck, North Dakota Bismarck/Mandan
- Fargo, North Dakota served prior to 1951
- Grand Forks, North Dakota served prior to 1951
- Minot, North Dakota
- Pembina, North Dakota served prior to 1951

Oklahoma

- Muskogee, Oklahoma
- McAlester, Oklahoma served prior to 1951
- Tulsa, Oklahoma

South Dakota

- Aberdeen, South Dakota
- Huron, South Dakota
- Sioux Falls, South Dakota
- Watertown, South Dakota

Texas

- Houston, Texas
- Longview, Texas Longview/Kilgore/Gladewater
- Paris, Texas
- Tyler, Texas

Wisconsin

- Madison, Wisconsin served prior to 1951
- Milwaukee, Wisconsin

Canada

Manitoba

- Winnipeg, Manitoba served briefly in 1934 (as Hanford Airlines)

Braniff International continued to serve the vast majority of the destinations listed above following its acquisition of Mid-Continent in 1952; however, by 1960 Braniff had ceased serving many of the smaller cities previously served by Mid-Continent.

== Incidents and accidents ==
- February 27, 1951, Convair CV-240-2 (N90664) crashed on climbout from Tulsa International Airport after the flaps were retracted at a too low air speed following engine problems; all 34 passengers and crew survived, but the aircraft was written off. The aircraft was operating a Minneapolis-Houston service with intermediate stops.
- March 2, 1951, Mid-Continent Airlines Flight 16, a Douglas DC-3A (N19928), stalled and crashed at Sioux City, Iowa while making a turn to land, killing 16 of 25 on board. The aircraft was operating a Kansas City-Minneapolis service with intermediate stops.
- June 11, 1941, just after midnight, Mid-Continent Airlines Flight 8, a Lockheed Model 10 Electra, registered as NC16058, originated at Tulsa, Oklahoma, at 7:30 p.m., with Minneapolis, Minnesota, as its terminating destination. Intermediate stops at Kansas City, Missouri, Omaha, Nebraska, Sioux City, Iowa, and Sioux Falls, Huron, and Watertown, South Dakota, were scheduled to be made on the route. On approach to Sioux City, the aircraft made a downwind approach and landing and subsequently landed too far down the runway to prevent exiting the runway end across a road and into a field in an upright position. The probable cause was determined to be inaccurate weather observation made by the Company radio operator and reported to the flight crew, resulting in pilot making a downwind landing. A contributing factor was failure of the airport lighting system appropriately and accurately light the runway area.

== Intellectual property of Mid-Continent Airlines ==
The trademarks, logos, likenesses, slogans and copyrights of Mid-Continent Airlines are currently owned by Braniff Airways, Inc. Braniff Airways Foundation administers Mid-Continent's intellectual property for Braniff Airways, Inc. Mid-Continent's name and Native American Chief Wapello logo are registered trademarks of Braniff Airways, Inc.

== See also ==
- Doolittle Raid
- List of defunct airlines of the United States
