= USS Huron =

USS Huron may refer to the following ships of the United States Navy:

- USS Huron (1861), was an Unadilla-class screw steam gunboat commissioned 8 January 1862 and sold 14 June 1869.
- USS Huron (1875), was an iron sloop-rigged steamer commissioned 15 November 1875 and lost in a storm off Nags Head, North Carolina in November 1877.
- USS Huron (ID-1408), was the former SS Friedrich der Große seized by the United States in 1917 and renamed Huron. She served as a troop transport in World War I and was decommissioned 2 September 1919.
- USS Huron (CA-9), was a Pennsylvania-class cruiser that was previously named South Dakota (ACR-9).
- USS Huron (PF-19), was a Tacoma-class frigate completed in 1944 and scrapped in 1947.
