= KOKK =

- Huron, South Dakota; United States
- Broadcast area: Heartland of Eastern South Dakota
- Frequency: 1210 kHz
- Branding: Dakota Country

Programming
- Format: Country
- Affiliations: ABC News Radio; Minnesota Timberwolves; Minnesota Twins

Ownership
- Owner: Carolyn and Doyle Becker; (Riverfront Broadcasting, LLC)
- Sister stations: KIJV, KJRV

History
- First air date: 1974
- Former frequencies: 1190 kHz

Technical information
- Licensing authority: FCC
- Facility ID: 15268
- Class: B
- Power: 5,000 watts day 870 watts night
- Transmitter coordinates: 44°21′44″N 98°9′9″W

Links
- Public license information: Public file; LMS
- Webcast: Listen Live

KOKK (1210 AM, "Dakota Country") is a radio station licensed to serve Huron, South Dakota. The station is owned by Carolyn and Doyle Becker, through licensee Riverfront Broadcasting, LLC. It airs a full-service country music format. It has changed its frequency since signing on the air. It was previously at 1190 AM.

The station was assigned this call sign by the Federal Communications Commission.

== History ==
The station originally signed on the air on 1190 kHz. In the 1980s, as a then-daytimer, the station was one of several stations who petitioned the United States Senate regarding the limitations of severe weather and sports coverage when they were off air during the evenings/early morning hours. The station was allowed to change frequencies in the late 1980s, to 1210 kHz, which provided nighttime operation.

In October 2022, the station was unable to switch to its daytime operating pattern, and requested a special temporary authority to operate on its nighttime power/pattern 24 hours a day. In late 2022, then-owner Dakota Communications Ltd sold KOKK and its sister stations to Riverfront Broadcasting for $255,000. The sister stations in the sale were KJRV and KIJV.

== Programming ==
In addition to its usual Country music programming, KOKK airs local news, market updates, ABC News updates, live sports coverage of area high schools, and both Sunday and Monday NFL football games. The station's motto is "KOKK - the station that grows on you." The station is used for emergency announcements by local entities. It is an affiliate of the Minnesota Twins. It was once an affiliate carrying American Top 40 with Casey Kasem.
